= Museo internazionale e biblioteca della musica =

Coordinates: 44°29′34″N 11°21′01″E

Museo Internazionale e Biblioteca della Musica
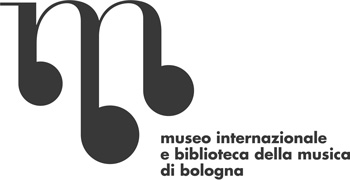

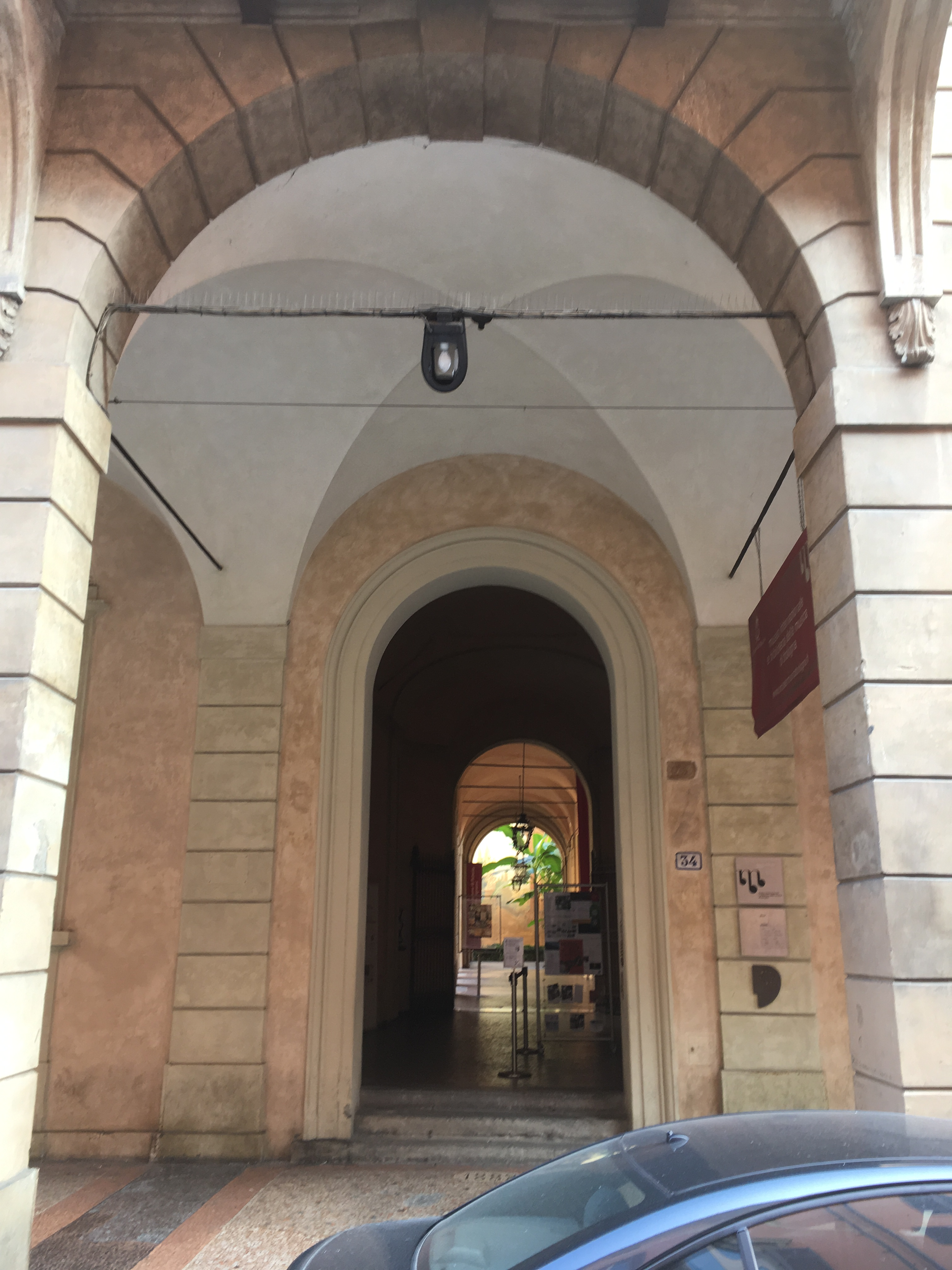
- Established: 2004
- Location: Strada Maggiore 34, Bologna, Italy
- Type: Museum, Historic site
- Director: Maurizio Ferretti
- Website: museibologna.it/musica

The Museo internazionale e biblioteca della musica ('international museum and library of music') is a music museum and music library in the Palazzo Aldini Sanguinetti, in the historic center of Bologna, Italy.

== Museum ==
=== Background ===
The museum and library's holdings and predecessors date back to the 1700s from the collections of Padre Martini (see below) and the holdings of the music school (founded as the Liceo Musicale in 1804 renamed as the Regio Conservatorio in 1942). The collections were reorganized as the Civico Museo Bibliografico Musicale in 1959, founded to hold the city's collection of musical objects. It was renamed Museo Internazionale e Biblioteca della Musica in 2004 when the museum's current site, the Palazzo Sanguinetti, opened to the public. The palace contains frescoes which were first completed between the late 18th and early 19th centuries, and provide one of the finest examples of Neoclassical decoration.

The museum exhibits highlight the rich musical heritage of Bologna. The museum is unusual among music museums in not being exclusively (or nearly exclusively) focused on music instruments, but also including other objects relating to music such as the paintings of musicians and collections of their manuscripts and prints. Until recently, much of this collection was warehoused. The palace provides an environment for display and conservation of these items.

The institute is divided between two sites. An ample selection of volumes, paintings, and musical instruments are displayed in the museum halls in Strada Maggiore 34 (Palazzo Sanguinetti), while the bibliographic material is accessible in Piazza Rossini 2 (the ex-Convent of San Giacomo) in rooms attached to the G.B. Martini Conservatory of Music.

==== The Palazzo Sanguinetti ====
In the early 16th century, the original core of this building belonged to the Loiani family. In 1569, the property was sold to the brothers, Ercole and Giulio Riario, originally from Savona, but who were related to the della Roveres. Having acquired neighboring land and buildings, Senator Ercole Riario had the home reconstructed and enlarged. The individual homes were united into one structure, and construction on the impressive staircase, which still characterizes the building today, was likely begun. The second major reconstruction was commissioned by Count Antonio Aldini, to whom the Marquis Raffaello Riario Sforza had granted a long-term lease in 1796. Count Aldini tasked the architect Giovanni Battista Martinetti (1774–1830) with modernizing the building. A neighboring house was attached to the tower belonging to the Oseletti family, and the huge 16th-century hall was divide into two rooms, which correspond to the modern museum's two most spacious rooms—the vestibule, or the Room of Virtues, and the Ballroom.

Following the fall of Napoleon and the economic ruin of Aldini, the palace was sold to the Cuban nobleman don Diego Pegnalverd, a former member of the Napoleonic government. Upon his death in 1832, the palazzo passed to the famous tenor, Domenico Donzelli. It is noted that Gioachino Rossini stayed there while his own nearby home was under reconstruction. In 1870 the Sanguinetti family purchased the building. They were responsible for the most recent decorations in the intended library and the "Egyptian Room". During recent renovations of the palazzo, marvelous frescoes were discovered in these areas.

In 1986, the last heiress, Eleonora Sanguinetti, donated the larger part of the building to the Comune di Bologna in memory–as she wrote in her will—of "my unforgettable father, Dr. Guido Sanguinetti. I ... donate the building in Strada Maggiore 34 in his name and memory, and for the love that he always had for his city and his home, so that it could become a music museum and library".

=== Frescoes and decorations ===
The Palazzo Sanguinetti was decorated by major 18th- and 19th-century Neoclassical painters, such as Pelagio Palagi (1777–1860), Serafino Barozzi (1735–1810), and Antonio Basoli (1774–1848), under the direction of Vincenzo Martinelli (1737–1807). On the ground floor, the landscape fresco (with trompe-l'oeil perspective) is attributed to Luigi Busatti, while the quadratura is the work of Francesco Santini (1763–1840). Santini, with the probable collaboration of Barozzi, also decorated the walls of the grand staircase. On the first floor, the Woodland Room (Room 1), previously used and called the Banquet Room, was decorated by Martinelli: he illustrates landscapes rich with greenery and classical architecture in the distance. These classical elements surround the onlooker in the illusion of a step that supports hermes and statues of Bacchus and Ceres, works by a young Palagi. The Aeneas Room (Room 2), also by Palagi, depicts stories of the Aeneid on a black, Etruscan background. The Zodiac and Aurora Room (Room 3) depicts the Zodiac signs by Domenico Corsini (1774–1814) and a figure of Aurora, attributed to Palagi. The last small room of the east wing (Room 4) is decorated by artists from the Barozzi workshop. They are also credited with the two rooms (Rooms 6 and 7) that conclude the west wing, which are decorated in oriental style with curtains and pavilions, exotic plants, and feminine figures with small umbrellas. Room 5 is the Ballroom. At the end of the museum tour are two salons in the apartment designed by Aldini; they were the first two rooms to be decorated. The original room (Room 8), is decorated by Antonio Basoli in a neo-gothic style, with figures, statues, and bass reliefs by Pietro Fancelli (1764–1850).

==== Father Giovanni Battista Martini ====
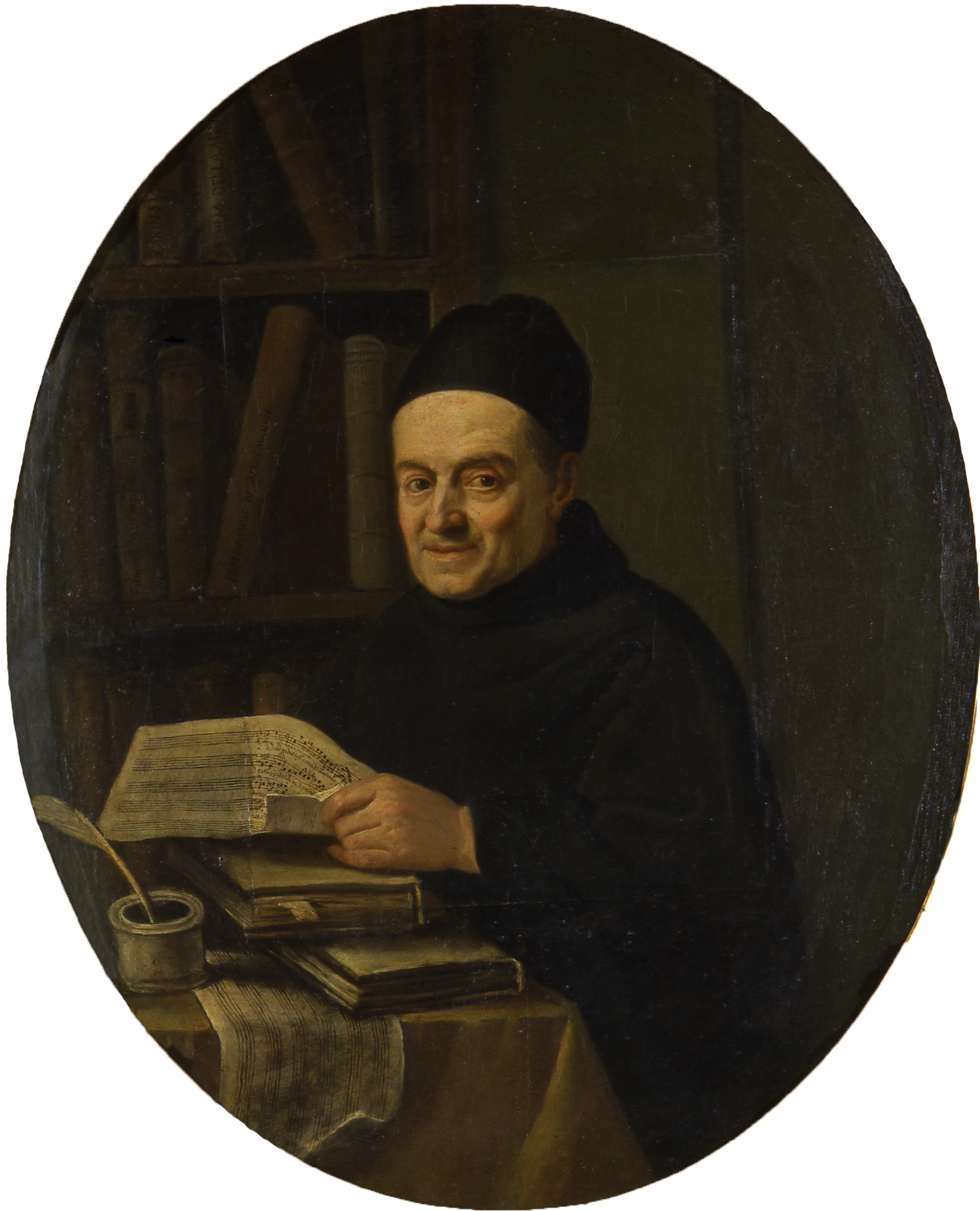
Portrait of Padre Gianbattista Martini. Author: Angelo Crescimbeni, 1770.

The original core of the museum's musical collections is credited to the Conventual Franciscan friar, Giovanni Battista Martini (Bologna, April 24, 1706—August 3, 1784), an 18th-century music scholar and collector, a theorist and composer, and a teacher of counterpoint. Johann Christian Bach and Wolfgang Amadé Mozart were among his students.

At only 19 years old, Martini was appointed chapel-master of the Church of San Francesco in Bologna. His fame as an excellent teacher and connoisseur of music began to grow when he "won" a dispute with the scholar, Redi, regarding the interpretation of a mysterious canone dell'Animuccia that existed in the choir gallery of the Santa Casa di Loreto, where Redi himself was chapel-master. After this triumph, not content with being only a scholar, he continued his music studies and was an admired composer of sonatas for the harpsichord, canons, and about 500 unpublished musical pieces.

The numerous letters conserved in the library (around 80 volumes with more than 6,500 letters), document the broad network of musicians, aristocrats, singers, and cardinals who had contacts with Martini. Even the Emperor of Austria visited Padre Martini while in Bologna. Martini collected not only manuscripts and musical works of various kinds, but also portraits of musicians displayed on the walls of his library in the Monastery of San Francesco.

=== Exhibition path ===
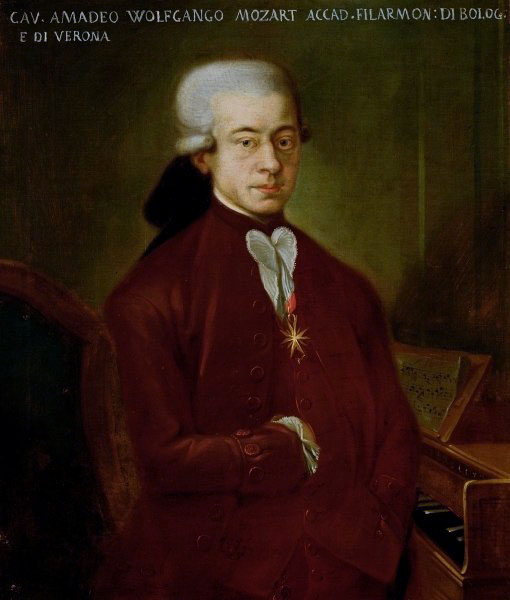
Portrait of Wolfgang Amadé Mozart, composer Author:unknown, 1777.

The museum path opens among the lush decorations of the Boschereccia Room with some symbolic works which serve as an introduction to the museum and prepare the visitor for their trip through the musical universe.

Rooms 2 and 3 are dedicated to the spiritual father of the new museum, pictured in an oval by Angelo Crescimbeni: Giambattista Martini, whose priceless moral heritage, both intellectual and material, is celebrated here and made known to the greater public.
In Room 3, the relationships between Padre Martini and the stand-out personalities of the music world of the time, such as the young Mozart or Johann Christian Bach, who is represented in the famous portrait by Gainsborough, are displayed. In the same room, one can also admire the famous Sportelli di libreria musicale by Giuseppe Maria Crespi.
Room 4 ("The Idea of Music") follows, which is dedicated to the musical scholars from the 15th century to the 17th century, with important examples of musical treatises, and portraits of their respective authors. This room also contains some musical instruments of great importance, like the unique omnitonum harpsichord by Vito Trasuntino (Venice 1606).

Some of the more relevant pieces are on display in the following Room 5 (Arts Room), which is dedicated to the "Books for music and instruments of the 16th and 17th centuries". In this room, rare texts from ranging the 15th century to the famous Harmonice Musices Odhecaton A, the first printed musical book by Ottaviano Petrucci, can be admired. They are kept inside very modern, circular cases in the center of the room, which match the rich decoration of the floors.

Then there are the instruments: lutes; the harmony of flutes by Manfredo Settala of 1650, which represents a real unicum; the pochette, various little violins used as instruments by dance instructors, the ghironde, the serpentoni, the extraordinary series of horns and cornets from the 16th and 17th centuries, and finally, a unique performance instrument: the tiorba, which is in the shape of a khitára.

Italian opera is the focus of the following room. The 18th century are first in Room 6, dedicated to the famous singer Carlo Broschi, known as Farinelli.

His beautiful portrait, painted by Corrado Giaquinto, dominates the room, together with the portraits of the castrati from various periods and of composers from the time, such as Antonio Vivaldi and Domenico Cimarosa.

Room 7 places the visitor in the 19th century with Gioachino Rossini, whose name is forever tied to Bologna. Portraits, busts, and libretti from the first recitals of Isabella Colbran, a singer and Rossini's first wife, can be found here. Also of interest is the original score of The Barber of Seville and some rather curious personal effects, like a dressing gown and a wig. Finally, one can behold Rossini's grand piano, which was constructed in 1844 by Camille Pleyel.

The path proceeds through the centuries, the musical uses, and styles in Room 8, which is dedicated to "Books for music and instruments in the 18th and 19th centuries". There are viole d'amore and flutes along with the original scores composed by Torelli, Vivaldi, Bertoni, etc. There are also clarinets and the beautiful Buccin, created in Lyon by Jean Baptiste Tabard (1812–1845).

Concluding the exhibit, Room 9 pays a proper tribute to two important people in the Italian and Bolognese musical culture, Giuseppe Martucci and Ottorino Respighi. This room displays the composer's portraits, photographs, and a selection of works from the Respighi property, which were donated to the library in 1961 by his widow, Elsa, for the 25th anniversary of his death. In the same room lies the portrait of the musician Arrigo Serato, painted by the famous artist Felice Casorati.

=== Collections ===
The first floor of the Palazzo is home to the nine rooms of the exhibition, which illustrates about six centuries of the history of European music. There are over one hundred paintings of famous people from the music world, which are a part of the picture gallery started by Padre Giovanni Battista Martini, more than eighty antique musical instruments, and a large selection of valuable historical documents, such as treatises, volumes, opera libretti, letters, manuscripts, original musical scores, etc.

== Library ==
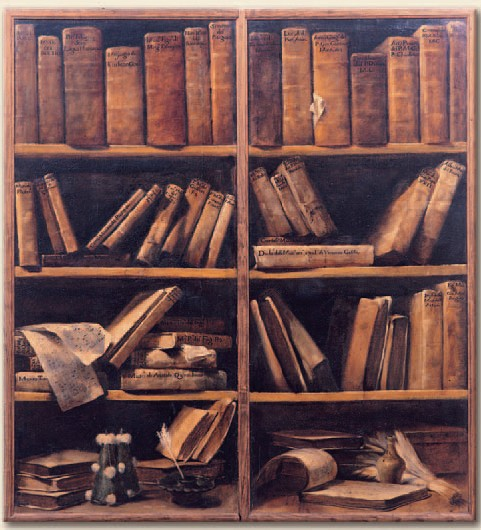
Libreria. Autore:G.M.Crespi, c. 1720–1730. Collocazione: Museo internazionale e biblioteca della musica

The collection inherited from Padre Martini constitutes one of the most prestigious collections of music repertory printed between the 16th and 18th centuries because of its incunabula, valuable manuscripts, opera libretti, and for the unique collection of autographs and letters, which are the result of the correspondence Martini painstakingly kept with eminent people, scholars, and musicians of the time. Saved from the Napoleonic confiscations due to the intervention of Stanislao Mattei, Martini's disciple and successor, the valuable bibliographic patrimony was donated to the Liceo musicale di Bologna in 1816. The Liceo had been founded in 1804 at the ex-convent of the Agostinians in the church of San Giacomo Maggiore. The library grew considerably throughout the 19th century and the first half of the 20th century, thanks to the amount of materials produced from the didactic activity of the Liceo; famous students of the Liceo included Rossini, Donizetti, Respighi and directors Mancinelli, Martucci, and Busoni.

The library also grew because of the valuable items and rare volumes that were acquired by Gaetano Gaspari, who was appointed as librarian in 1855.

Gaspari directed the library for many years with a unique zeal and knowledge. After many years of hard work and constant effort, he was able to excellently organize and card-catalogue all the library material (also from this period came the posthumous publication, the "Library Catalogue of the Liceo Musicale di Bologna", which bears his name and is now also available online).

In 1942, when the Liceo musicale was transformed into a state institution—Regio Conservatorio di Musica—the Comune di Bologna chose to maintain ownership of Padre Martini's bibliographic patrimony and the attached picture gallery.

The Civico Museo Bibliografico Musicale was founded in 1959 in order to conserve and make the most of the bibliographic patrimony and portrait gallery. Among the books in the collection not usually on display is the manuscript Bologna Q15, one of the most important collections of music of the early fifteenth century, including the sacred works of Johannes Ciconia and many of the earliest sacred works of Guillaume Du Fay.

=== Art gallery ===
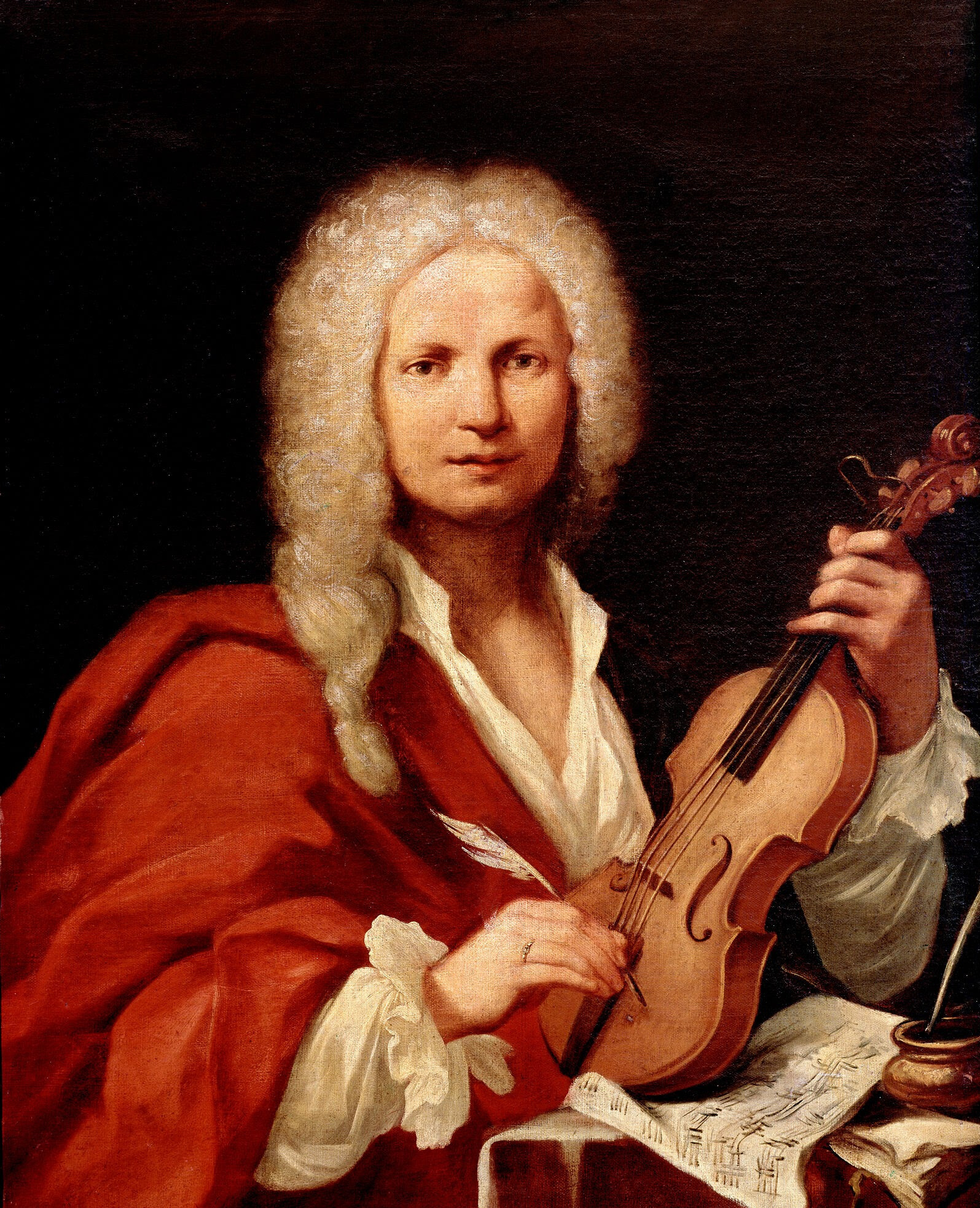
Supposed portrait of Antonio Vivaldi. Author and date unknown.

There is not much information about the development of the picture gallery, which seems to have had no rivals in Bologna during the 18th century. From the valuable letters of correspondence that Padre Martini kept with different well-known people of the time (for example, musicians that were his students in Bologna, members of the Accademia Filarmonica, music theorists, composers, nobles, illustrious intellectuals, chapel masters, and custodians of Franciscan convents), it is evident that there was a complex network of informers and intermediaries that were responsible for finding the portraits he desired.

Many of the portraits were commissioned to the artists directly by Padre Martini. The painters drew the features of the musicians from engravings of the time. In reality, he wasn't interested in the artistic worth of the paintings as much as their plausible resemblance to the model. He was also more interested in whether they were in harmony with his century's interest in the physiognomic reading of faces with the intention of giving iconographic testimony of the people bonded by one common denominator—music. It was also important that the paintings had a direct relationship with his Library.

It's worth noting that there are many paintings by famous artists present in the collection, including the portrait of Farinelli by Corrado Giaquinto, the portrait of Johann Christian Bach by Gainsborough, and one of Charles Burney by Joshua Reynolds.

It also seems that the prestige of Padre Martini, who was considered the most knowledgeable European expert on the art of music, was so great that it was important for a musician of that time to have their portrait in his gallery. This served as a recognition of the musician's merit.

The picture gallery remained in the convent of San Francesco even after Martini's death, surviving the Napoleonic confiscations thanks to Martini's successor, Padre Stanislao Mattei. Only in 1801 was it transferred to the ex-convent of the Agostinians at the Chiesa di San Giacomo Maggiore. Today, the collection consists of 319 paintings, the majority of which are oil on canvas with some pastels and drawings.

=== The collection of musical instruments ===
The musical instruments displayed in the rooms of the museum originate from the collections of two important Bolognese institutions: the Museo Civico Medievale and the Civico Museo Bibliografico Musicale. The core of this collection from the Museo Civico Medievale comes from the Liceo musicale, which was founded in 1804. As Federico Parisini (the Liceo librarian from 1881 to 1891) explained, following the Napoleonic suppressions, "the instruments, many famous musical works, chorus books, rare instruments, and other items related to music were sold publicly".

The central administration of the Dipartimento del Reno had asked the government of the Repubblica Cisalpina to purchase and conserve the objects that risked being dispersed. The recovered instruments were then entrusted to the Liceo and, in 1881, were finally added to the Museo Civico Medievale, where they have remained until today.

Among the most valuable instruments now displayed in the rooms of the museum is the Trasuntino harpsichord of 1606 (displayed in Room 4). It was constructed for Camillo Gonzaga, the Count of Novellara, and afterwards was passed to Giuseppe Baini (1775–1844), the celebrated author of the first biography of Palestrina. In his will, Baini bequeathed the harpsichord to the Liceo Musicale. Other valuable instruments on display are the Trasuntino monochord, which was built to tune the cymbal, and the 5-reed flute, which is able to mimic several flutes playing in harmony. There is also the polyphonic flute (displayed in Room 5), which bears the mark of Manfredo Settala (1600–1680), a Milanese rector, who was a great collector and famous personality in the cultural panorama of the 17th century.

The origin of the collection of musical instruments in the Civico Museo Bibliografico Musicale is more uncertain. The collection includes some particularly important models, such as eight pianos, five of which are grand pianos and three of which are rectangular. These pianos date back to the 17th and 18th centuries. Among these are the priceless Erard from 1811 (that possibly belonged to Paolina Borghese), which was restored for the inauguration of the museum and is now exhibited in Room 8. Also included are Gioachino Rossini's Pleyel piano of 1844 (exhibited in Room 7), and the so-called "spinette of Padre Martini", a rectangular Glonner from 1780 (displayed in Room 3). Other important instruments on display are the Heckelphon of 1900 (Room 8), various English horns, some cornets, and two oboes.

==== Services Library ====
Though it is to be transferred to a new site, the library is located in Piazza Rossini 2. It is made up of a single reading room, which is shared with the Conservatorio di Musica "G.B. Martini". The room has 20 seats, twelve of which are exclusively reserved for the consultation of antique and particular texts. There are two microfilm (and one microfilm/microfiches) machines available in the room, and a space for bibliographic and catalogue searches.

== Gallery ==
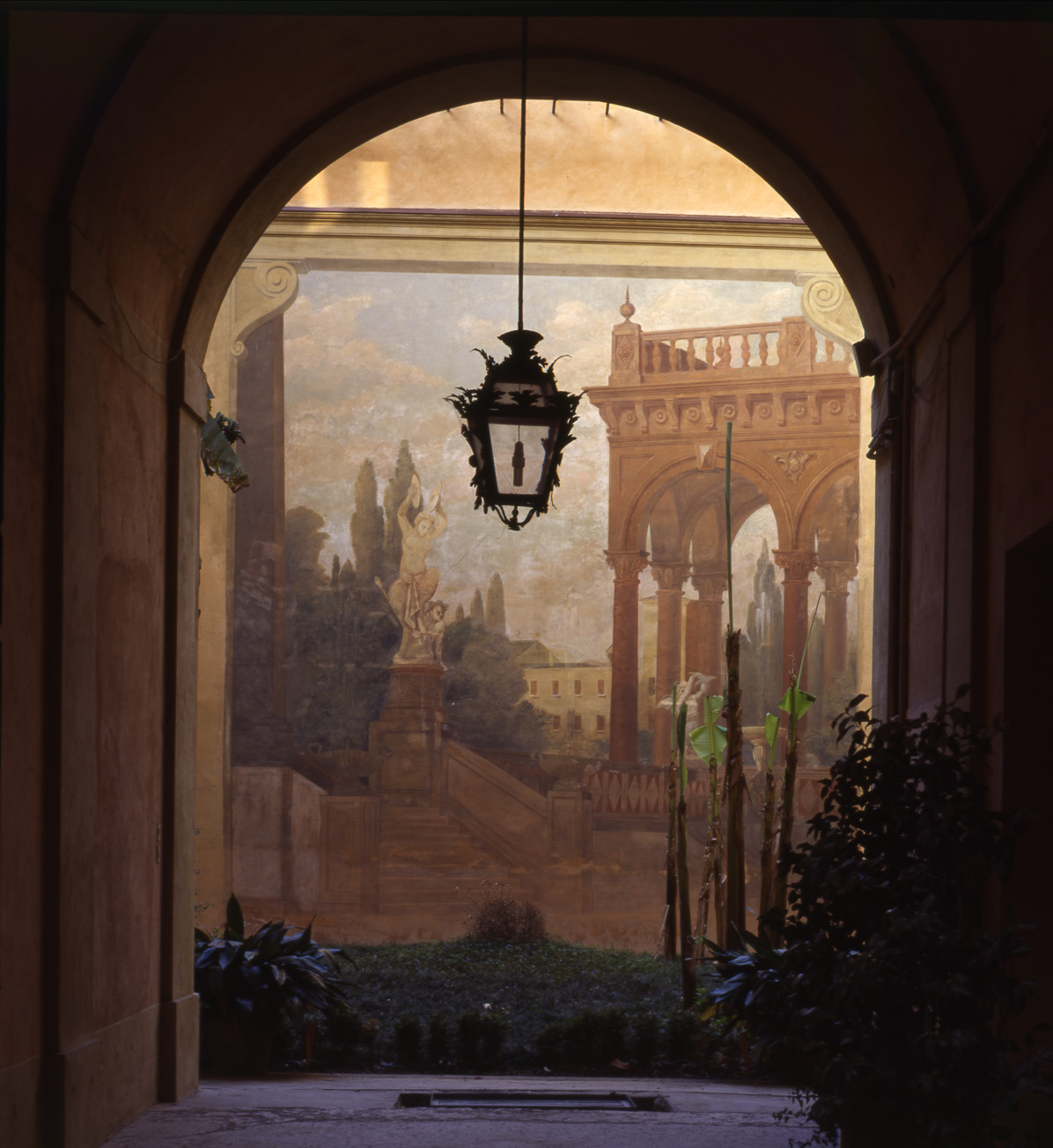
Entrance - Trompe l'oeil - Luigi Busatti

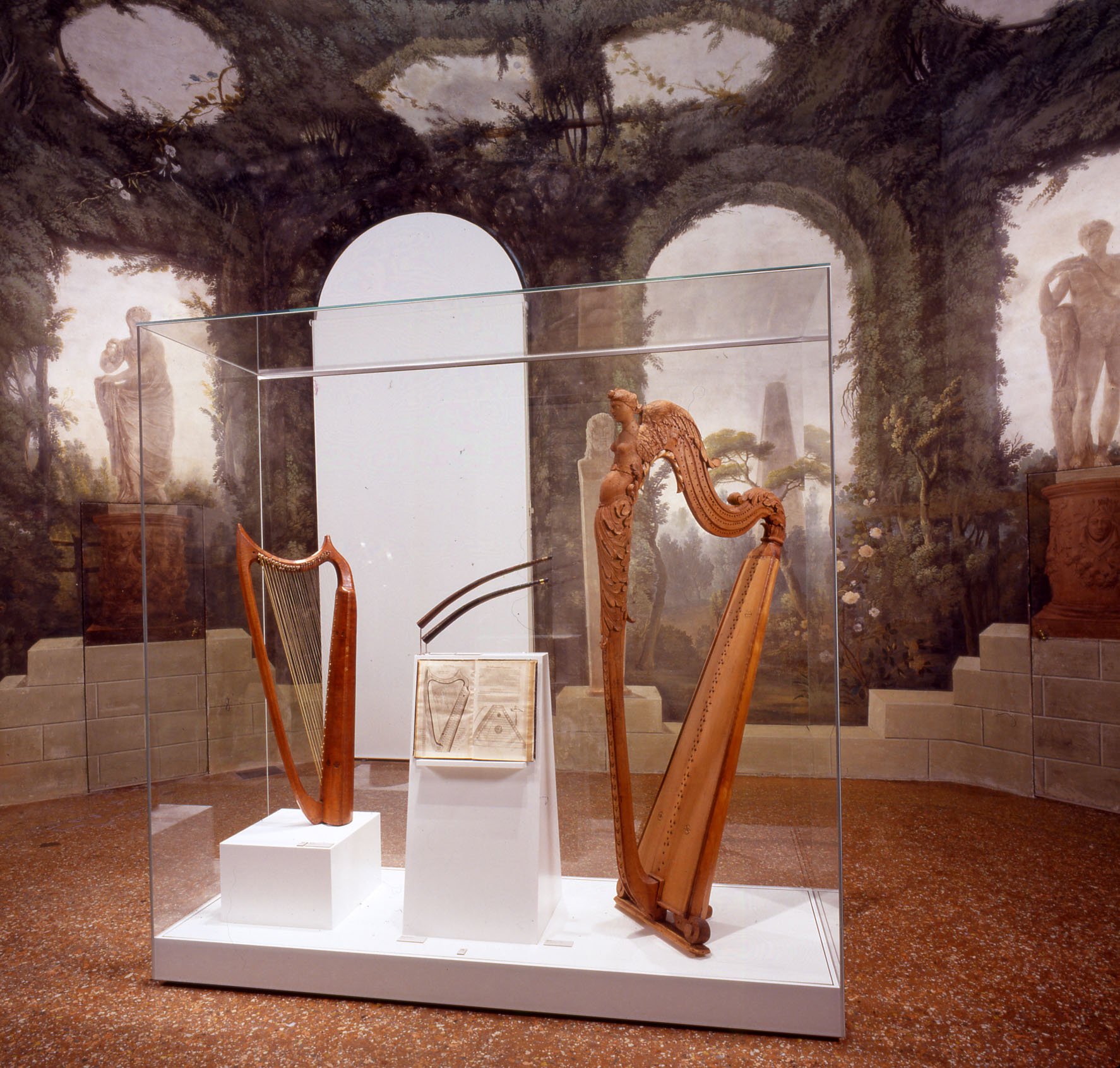
Room 1 - Alla boschereccia

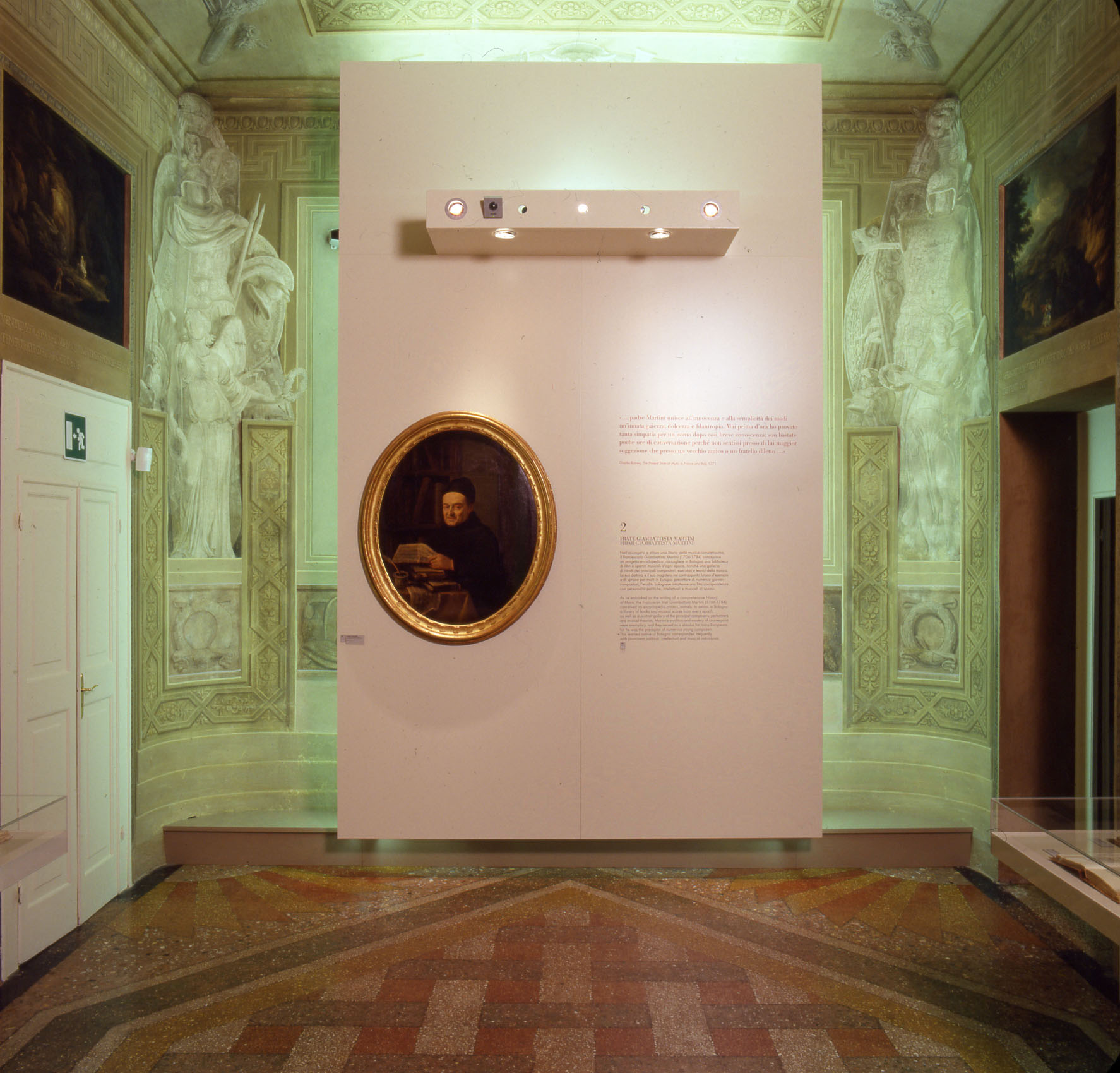
Room 2 - Frate Giambattista Martini

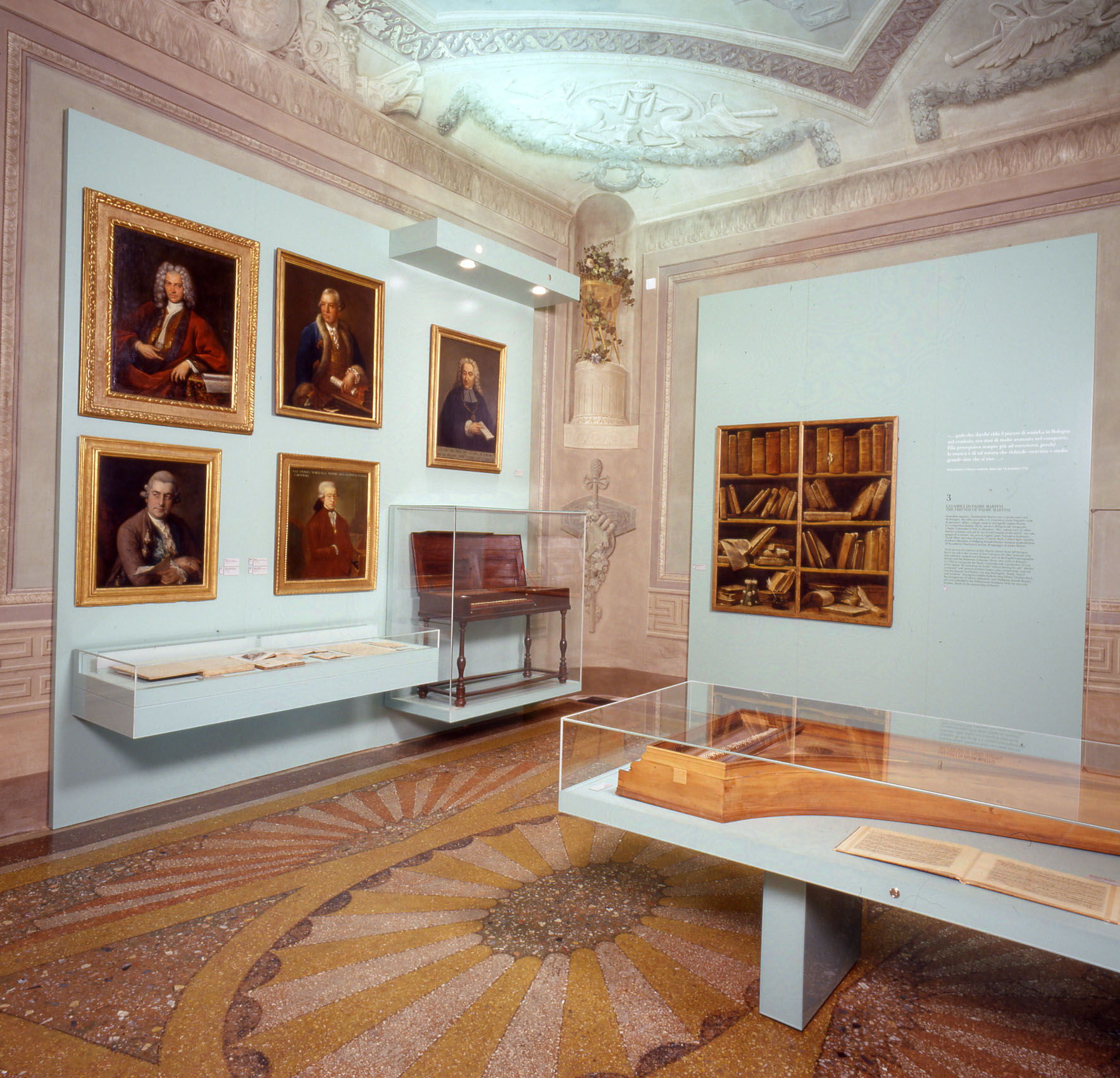
Room 3 - Friends of Padre Martini

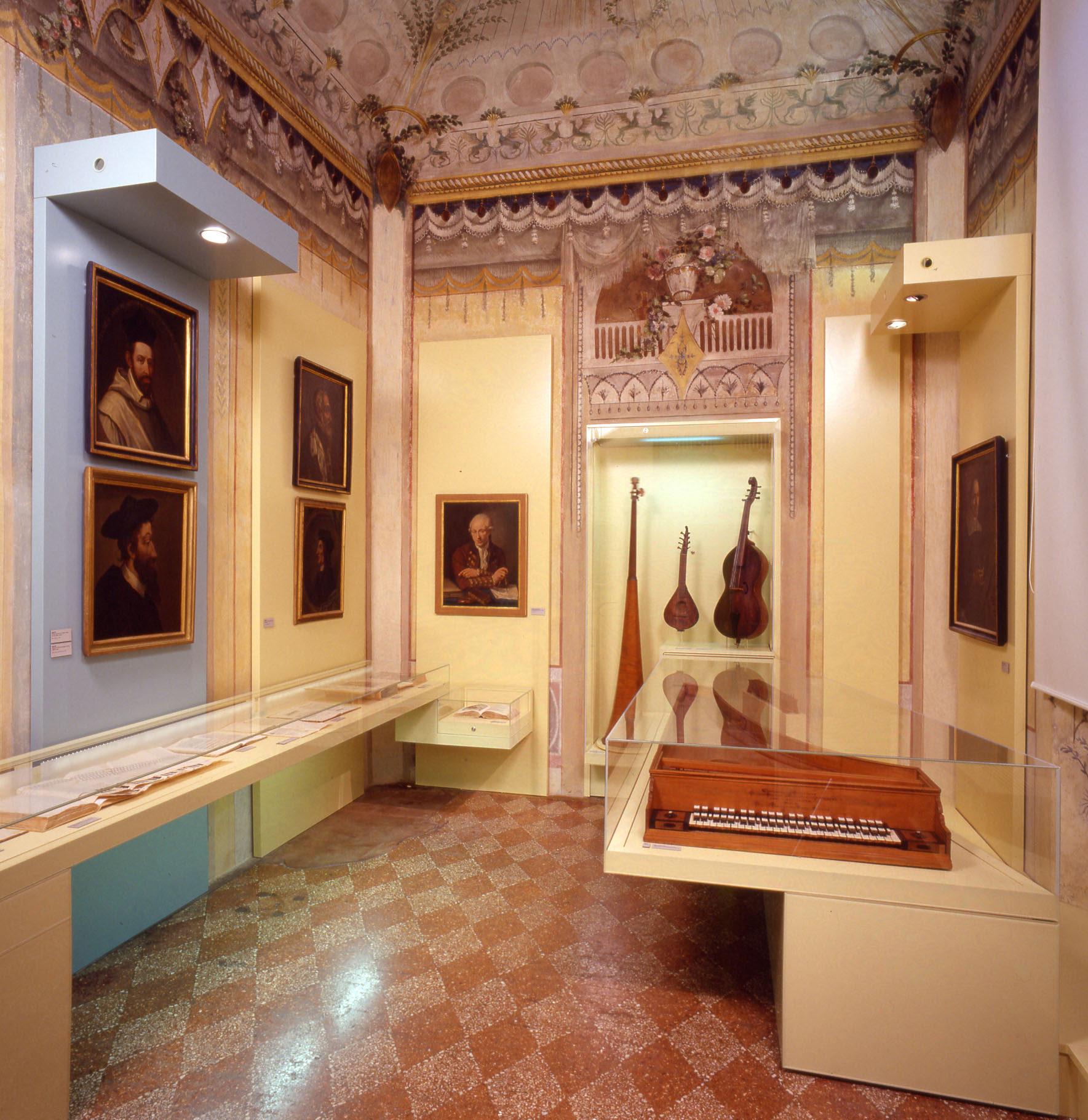
Room 4 - The Idea of Music

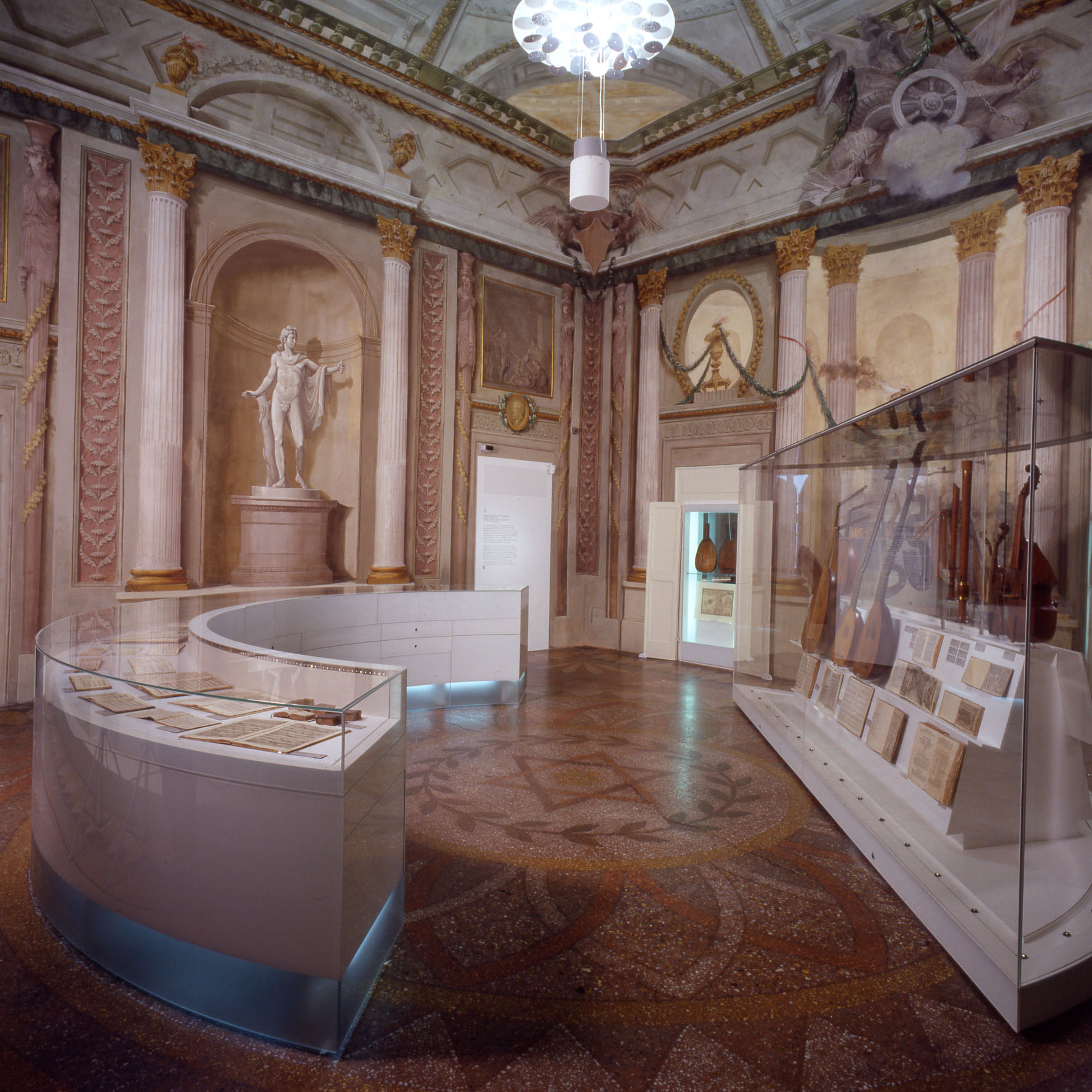
Room 5 - Books for music and instruments of 16th and 17th centuries

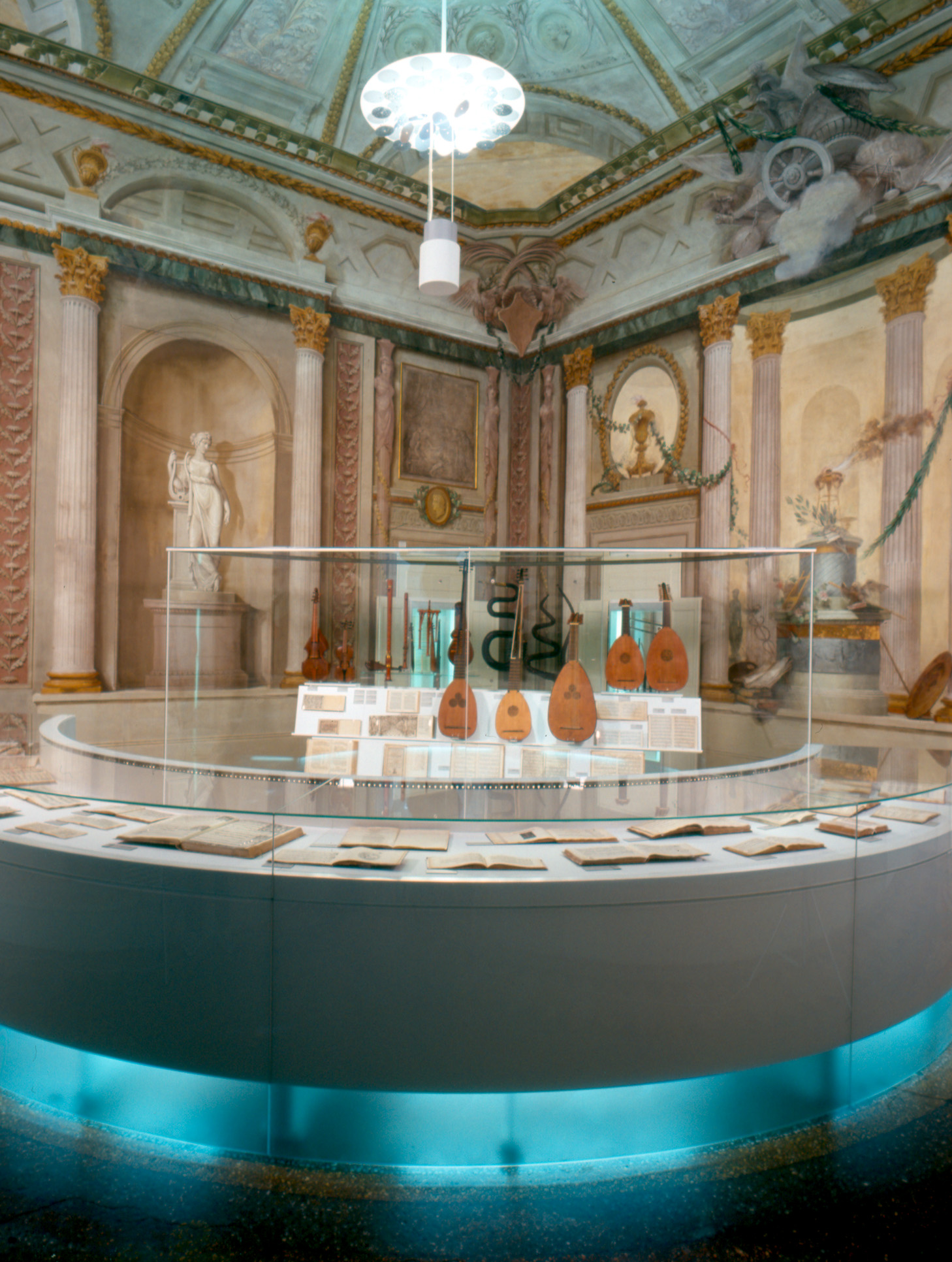
Room 5 - Books for music and instruments of 16th and 17th centuries

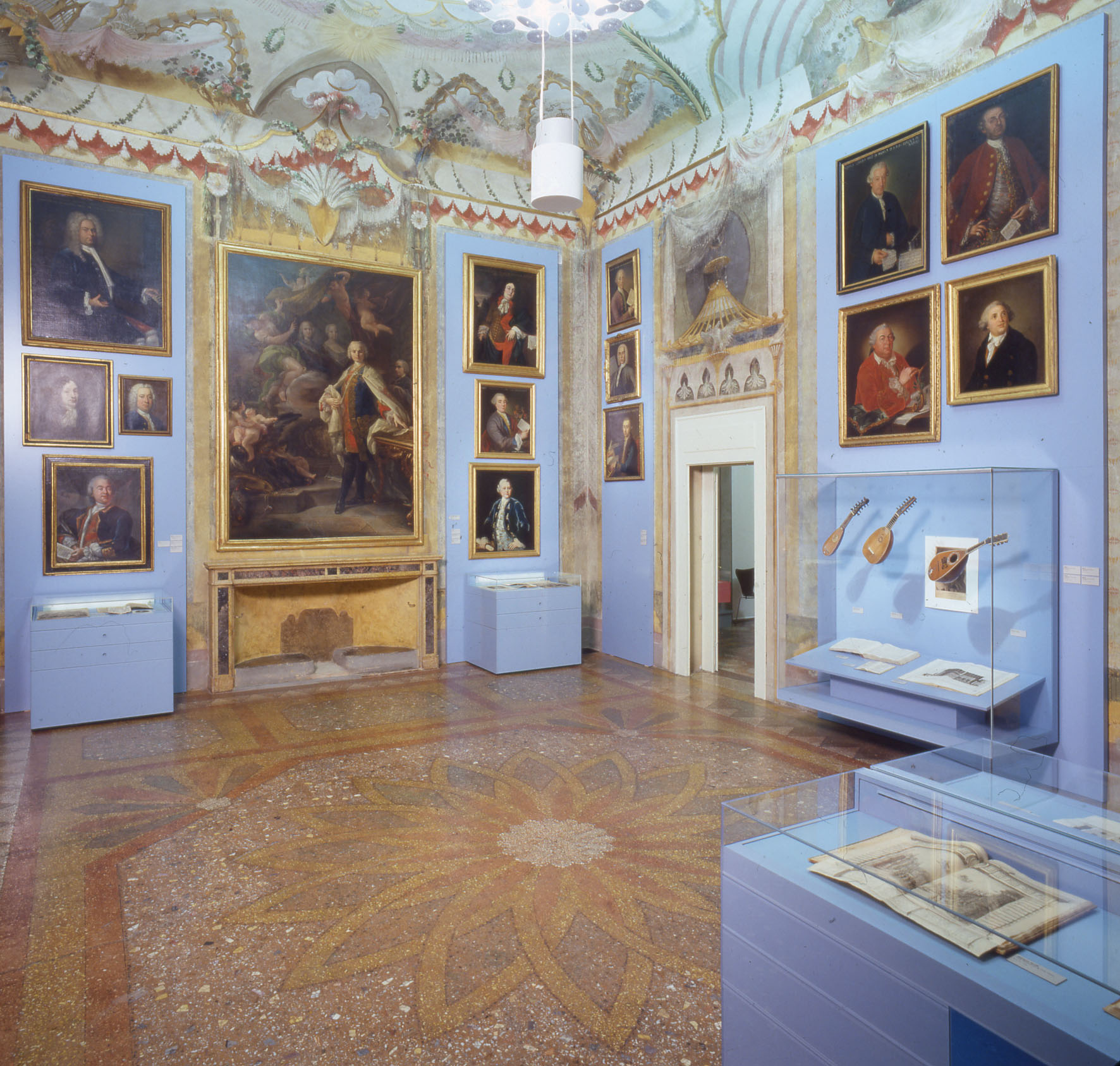
Room 6 - Farinelli and the italian opera in the 18th century

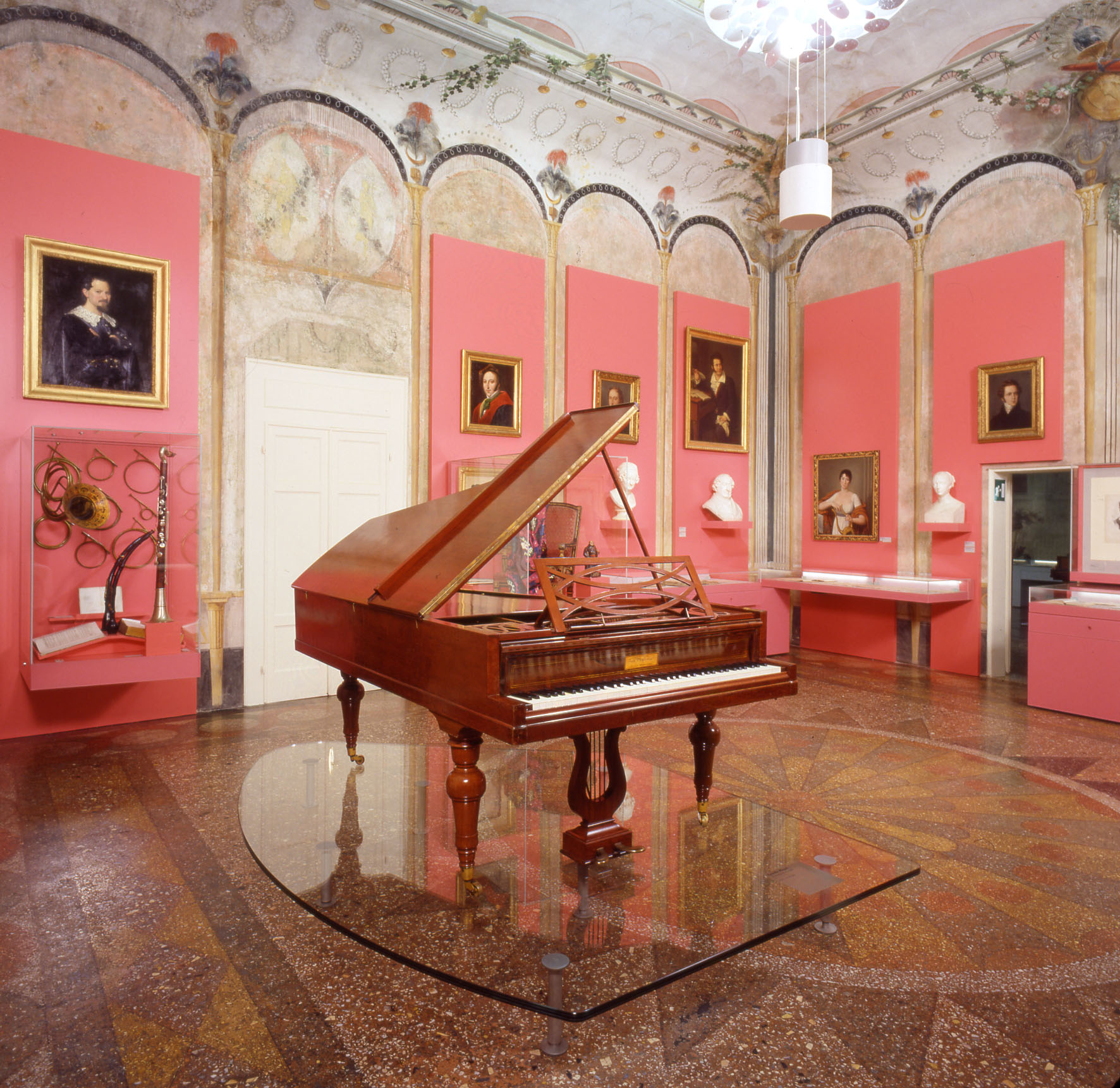
Room 7 - Rossini and the opera of the 19th century

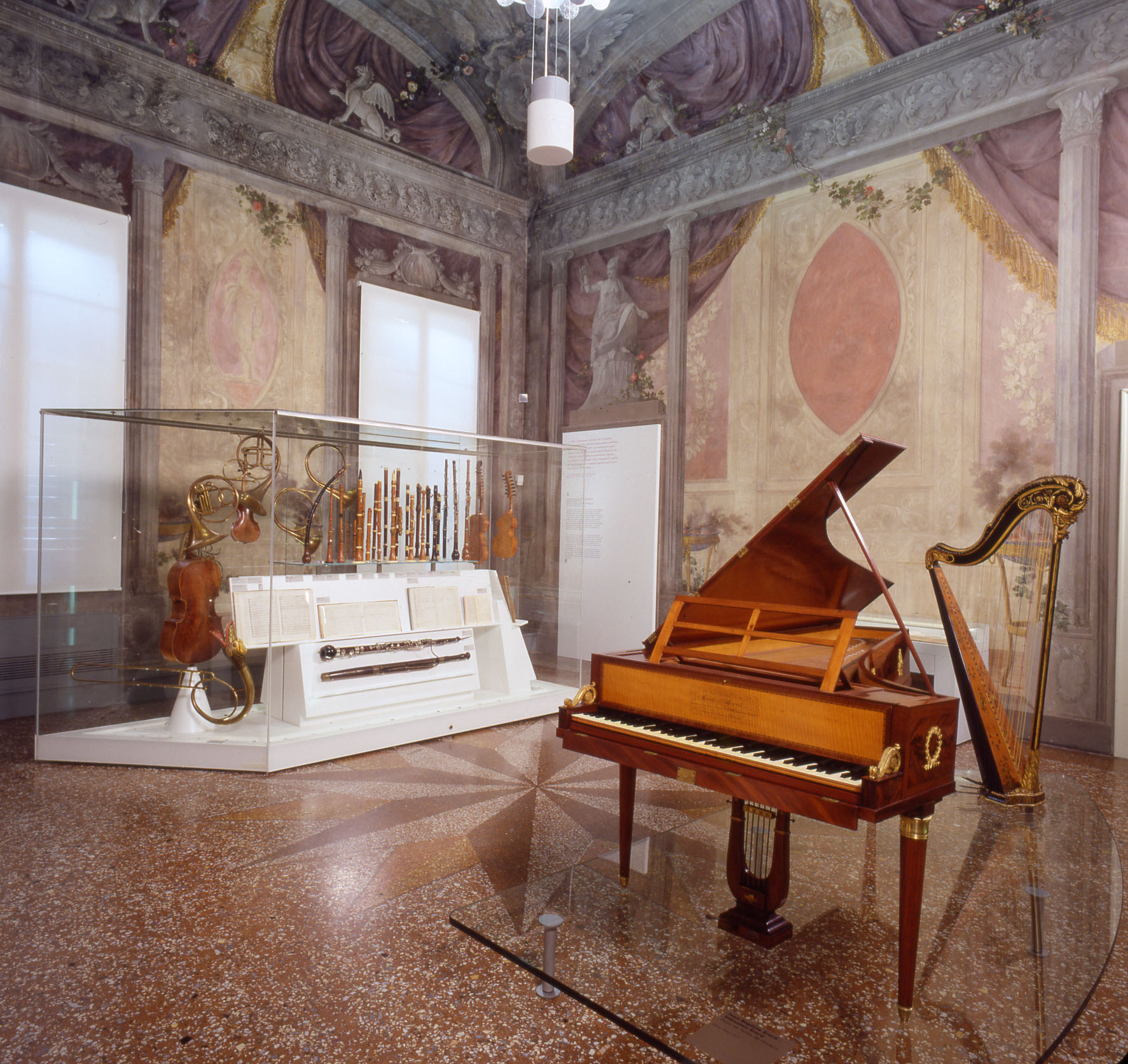
Room 8 - Books for music and instruments of 18th and 19th centuries

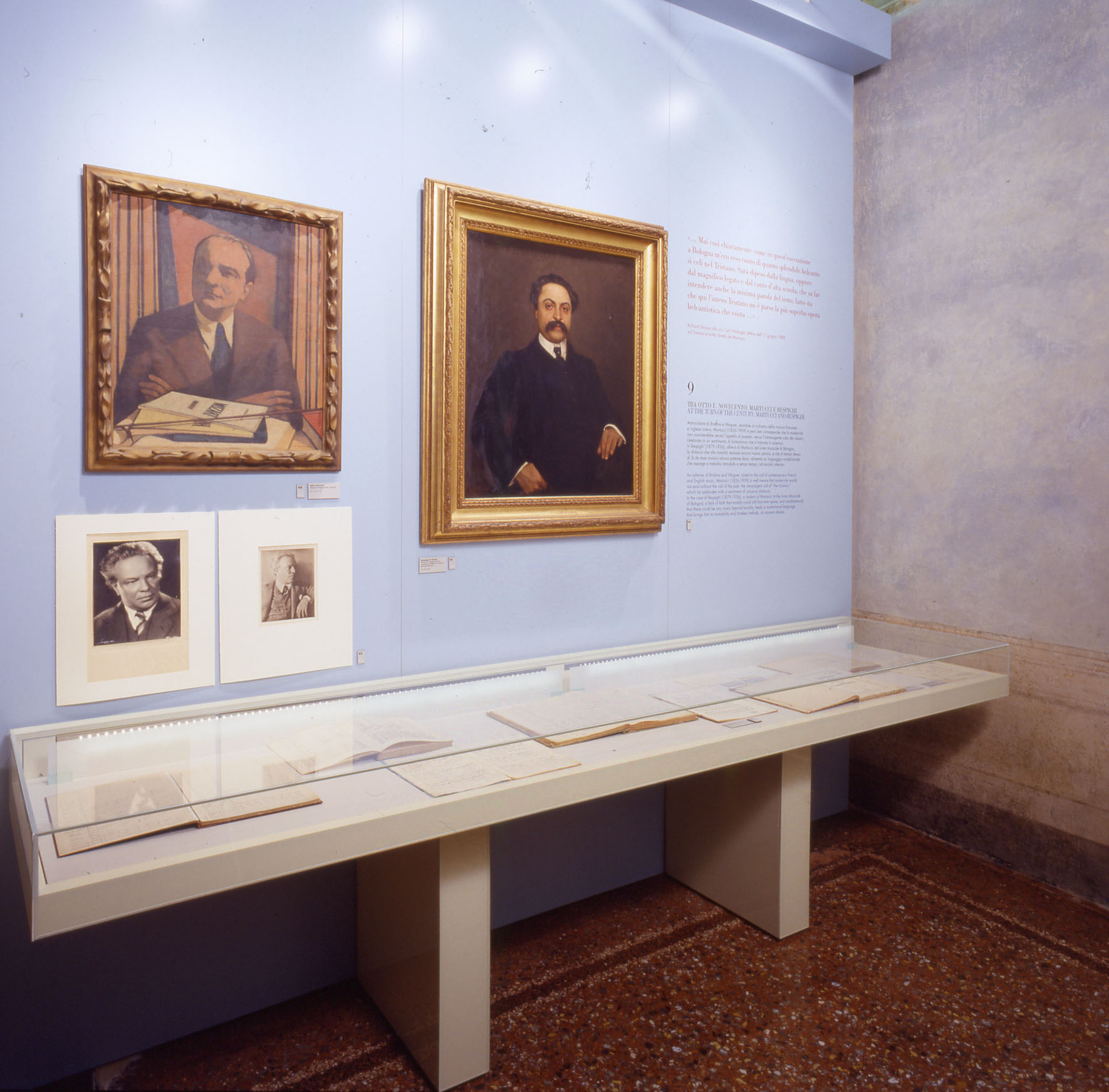
Room 9 - Between 19th and 20th century: Martucci and Respighi

== See also ==
- List of music museums
- Frate Giambattista Martini
- Rossini
- Martucci
- Farinelli
