= Giuseppe Guizzardi =

Italian painter (1779–1861)

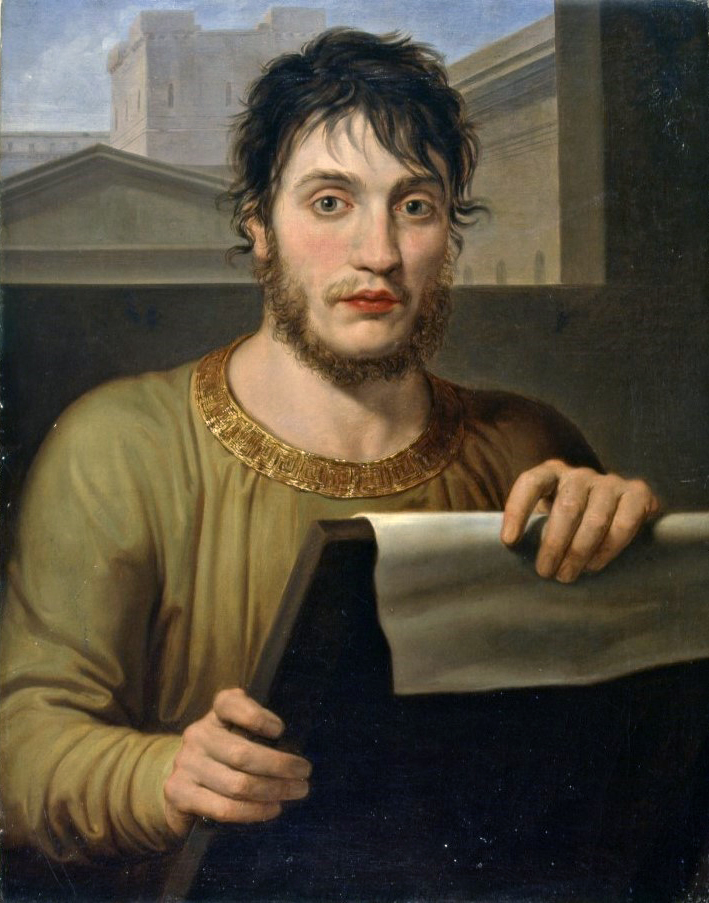
Pelagio Palagi, Portrait of Giuseppe Guizzardi, 1807

Giuseppe Guizzardi (1779 – July 29, 1861) was an Italian painter during the Neoclassical period.

== Biography ==
He was born in Bologna, and studied under Giuseppe Valiani at the Accademia Clementina.

He specialized in figure painting and restorations. In 1804, began at the Academy and then moved to Rome in 1809, where he befriended Pelagio Palagi. He exhibited portraits at the Bolognese academy in 1817 and 1819. In 1823 at Modena, he engraved a book titled Works of Guido Mazzoni and Antonio Begarelli. In 1822, he collaborated, acting as the figure painter, in the decoration of the Palazzo Baciocchi with Antonio and Francesco Basoli; he likely also collaborated with them in the decoration of Palazzo Contri. He also painted frescoes in a Neo-Etruscan-style, with figures in pink on dark backgrounds, in the Villa Conti la Panglossiana in Bologna. At the cemetery founded at the Certosa of Bologna, he completed (now lost) works for the funeral monuments of Luigi Berti and Rosalia Velluti Zati; in these he worked alongside Gaetano Caponeri and Luigi Busatti.
