= Venturoli =

Venturoli is an Italian surname. Notable people with the surname include:

- Angelo Venturoli (1749–1821), Italian architect
- Giacomo Venturoli (fl. 17th century), Italian mathematician
