= Valiani =

Valiani is a surname. Notable people with the surname include:

- Giuseppe Valiani (1730-1800), Italian painter
- Bartolomeo Valiani (1793-1858), Italian painter
- Valfredo Valiani (born 1960), Italian horse trainer
- Francesco Valiani (born 1980), Italian footballer
- Leo Valiani (1909–1999), Italian politician and journalist
