= Basoli (surname) =

Basoli is an Italian surname. Notable people with the surname include:

- Antonio Basoli (1774–1848), Italian painter, interior designer, scenic designer, and engraver
- Luigi Basoli (1776–1849), Italian painter, brother of Antonio
