= Villa Muratori-Guerrini-Meriggiano =

The Villa Muratori-Guerrini, now Villa Meriggiani is a suburban Neoclassic villa located on Via Mazzini in the Crespellano-Calcara neighborhood of Valsamoggia, in the Metropolitan City of Bologna, Italy. It remains now a private residence of the Meriggiani family. The architect was the prominent Angelo Venturoli.

== History ==
The site for the villa had some housing when it was bought by a member of the Muratori by the mid 1700s. In 1777, Angelo Venturoli was engaged to build a villa. The building quotes from Palladian structures such as a large window on piano nobile, but maintains a general neoclassic severity. The facade has four monumental ionic columns. The interiors were frescoed by Petronio Fancelli, and his son, Pietro. By the 19th century, the villa was sold to the Guerrini family. In 1927, it passed on to the Meriggiani family.
