= Giacomo De Maria =

Italian sculptor (1762-1838)

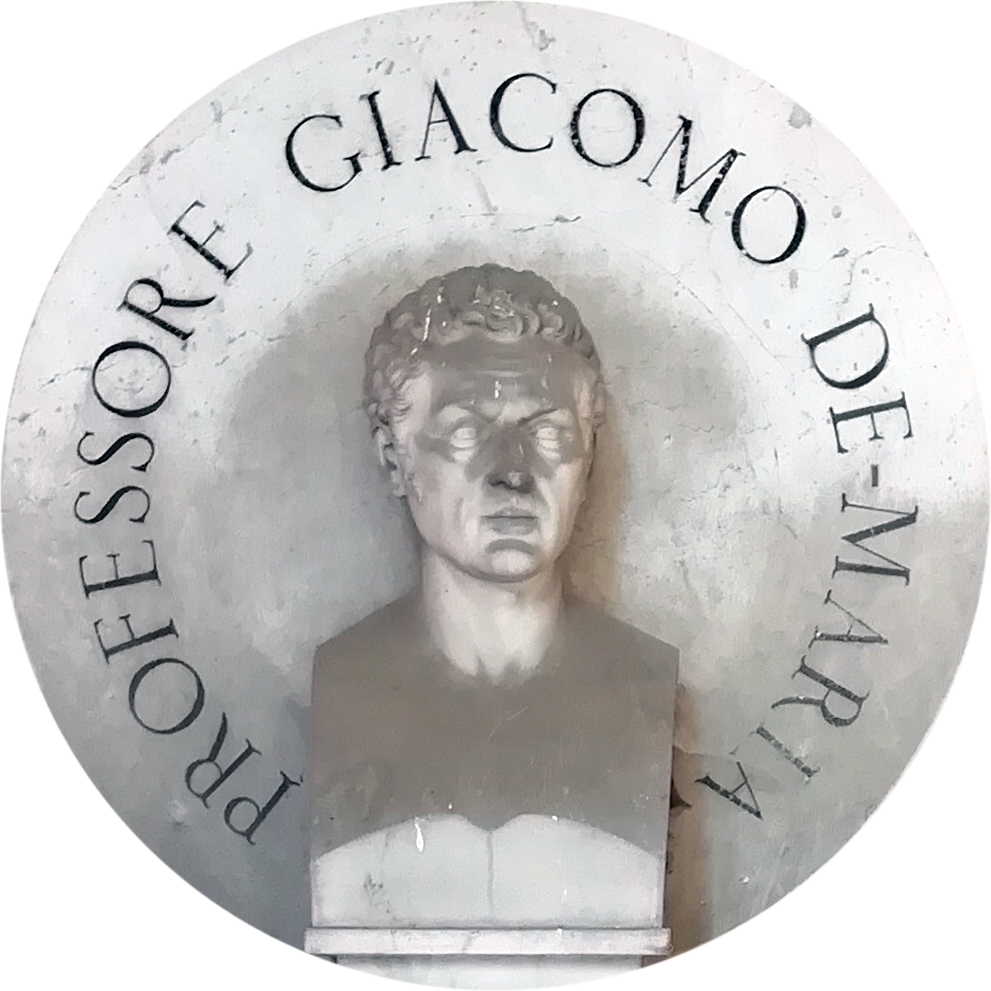
Portrait of Giacomo De Maria attributed to Mario de Maria.

Giacomo De Maria (1762–1838) was an Italian sculptor, active in Bologna.

== Biography ==
He was a pupil of Domenico Piò. Among his works are:

- Putti of the chapel after the crossing of San Petronio
- Statues in the atrium of the Palazzo Hercolani, Bologna
- Bust of Angelo Venturoli for his college
- Statues in the fifth chapel of San Giorgio
- Bas-relief of Olympus for tympanum of the facade of Palazzo Aldini, Bologna
- Charity in the Monumental Arch of the Lupari family at the Certosa of Bologna
- Sculpture of the Conventi, Ranuzzi, Cospi, and Caprara-Montecuccoli tomb monuments (latter has a "veiled eternity")
