= Palazzo Hercolani, Bologna =

Palazzo Hercolani
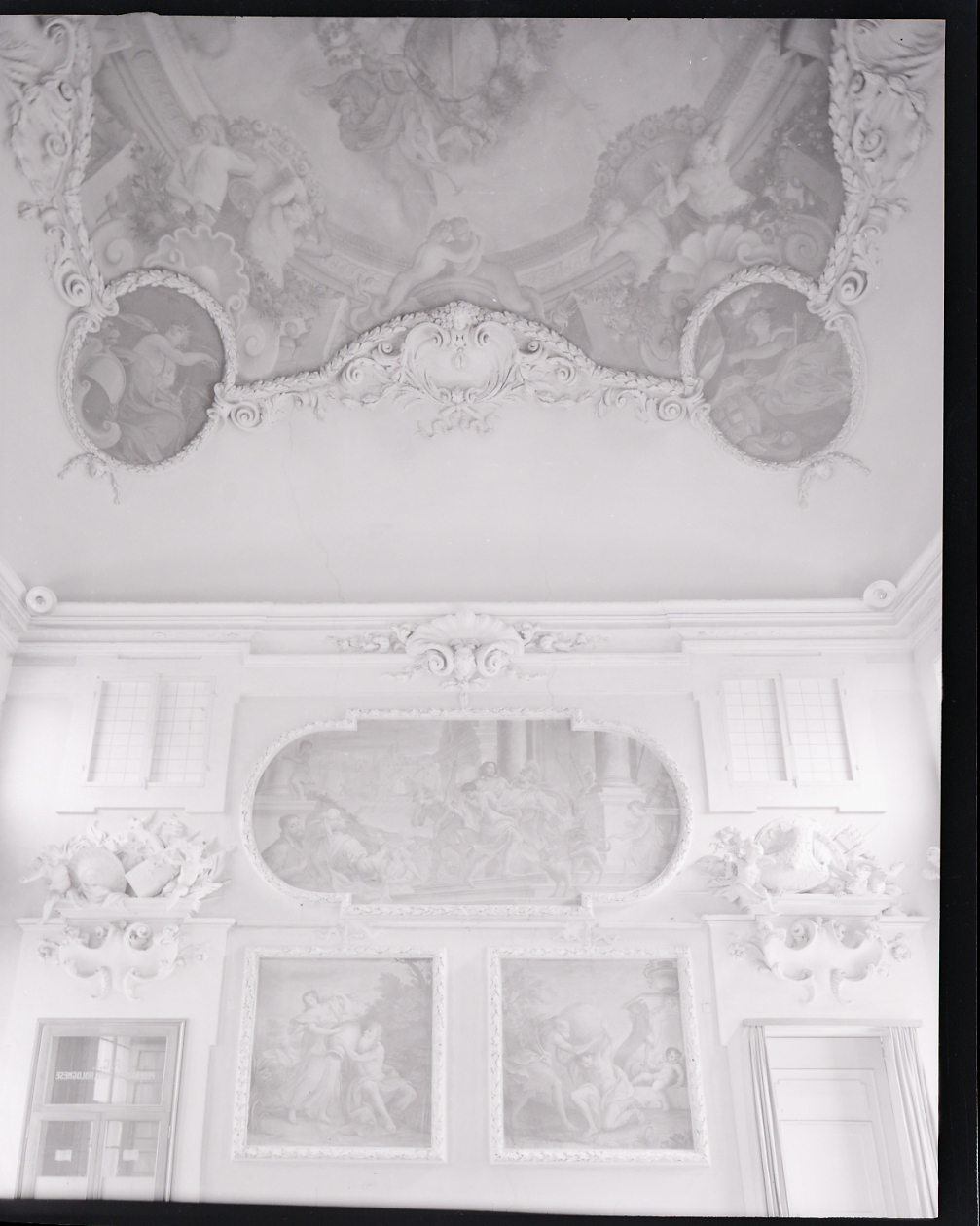
- Decoration of the interior. Photo by Paolo Monti, 1969
- Interactive map of the Palazzo Hercolani area

General information
- Type: Palace
- Architectural style: Rococo
- Location: Bologna, Italy
- Coordinates: 44°29′29″N 11°21′14″E
- Groundbreaking: 1785

Design and construction
- Architect: Angelo Venturoli

The Palazzo Hercolani or Ercolani is a large Rococo or Neoclassic-style palace in Strada Maggiore in central Bologna, which now serves as the offices for the Political Science Department (Facoltà di Scienze Politiche) of the University of Bologna.

== History ==
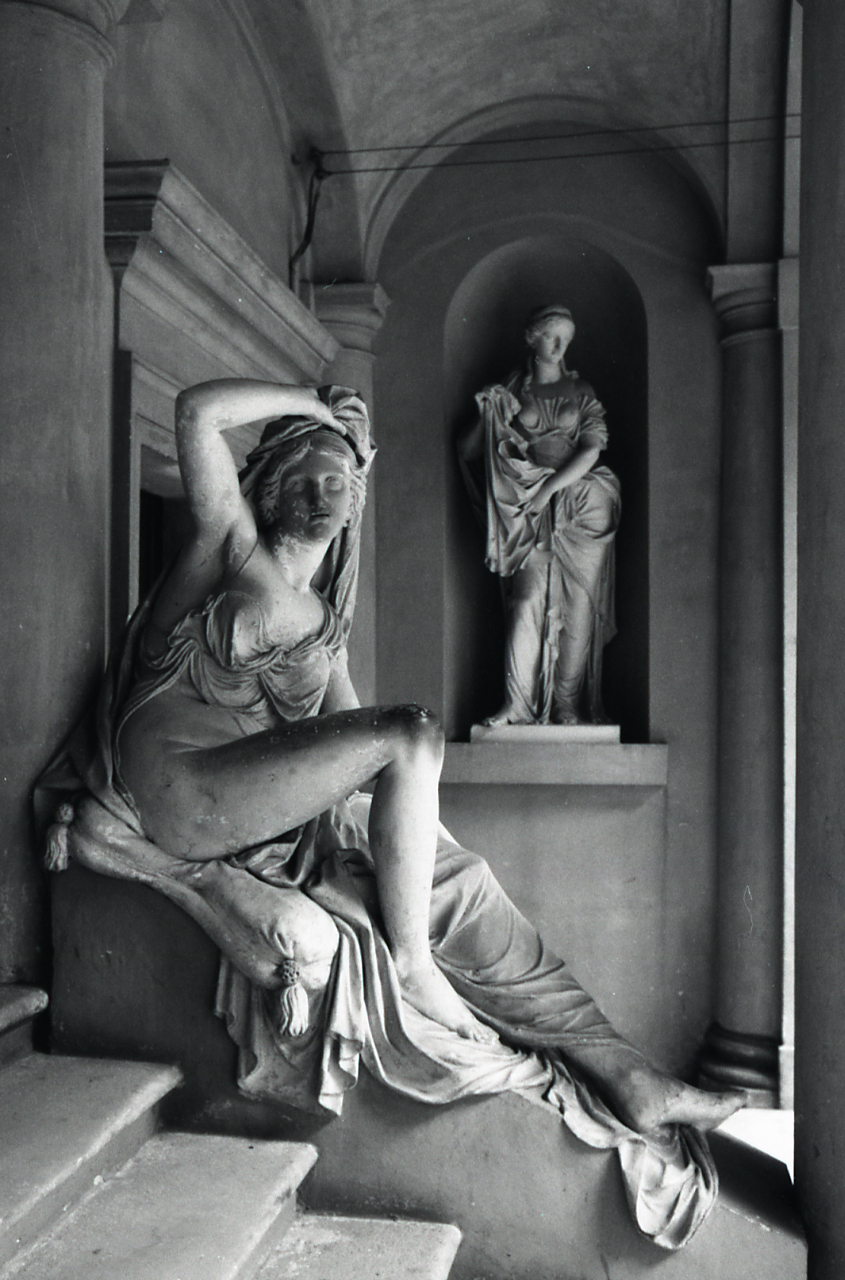
Statues at Palazzo Hercolani. Photo by Paolo Monti, 1969

The palace we see today was commissioned in 1785 by aristocrat Filippo Hercolani; the architect was Angelo Venturoli. Whilst the facade has classic restraint, the internal grand staircase and internal decorations are evidence of the late-Baroque or Rococo ornateness. On the first floor is a room frescoed likely by Pedrini with scenes dedicated to Fame and the Human Genius depicting Homer, Pindar, Hesiod and Democritus. Two rooms were decorated in chinoiserie style by Davide Zanotti. Other rooms bear decorations and paintings by Giovanni Battista Frulli, Luigi Busatti, Antonio Basoli, Gaetano Caponeri, Flaminio Minozzi, Vincenzo Martinelli and other artists.

Of particular note are two ground-floor rooms, the neoclassic Zodiac Room with frescoes probably by Basoli and the Winter Garden room - the ‘woodland’ painted by Rodolfo Fantuzzi. Both overlook the garden of the Palazzo, which in its heyday contained a "magnificent large garden, part French and part English, adorned with factories, small mountains".

== Sources ==
- Entry in City Tourism Website
