= Bartolomeo Valiani =

Italian painter (1793–1842)

Bartolomeo Valiani (Pistoia, 12 March 1793 - Pistoia, 1842) was an Italian painter.

== Biography ==
He was born in Pistoia, but active many years in Bologna, where he initially traveled to train first with his uncle, Giuseppe Valiani, then to study in Rome with a professor at the Accademia Clementina, Pietro Fancelli. He twice won submissions to the Bolognese academy, the Marsili Aldrovandi prizes, in 1797 and 1799, with submissions titled Porzia inghiotte i carboni ardenti and La congiura di Bruto per la morte di Cesare.

He learned architectural drawing and quadratura, and was in demand in Bologna. He traveled for a spell to Parma. He returned to Bologna to become a professor of design at the Collegio Forteguerri.

In 1803-1804 for the Certosa of Bologna, he helped decorate and design the funeral monument to Carlo Mondini, working alongside the ornamentalist Petronio Rizzi. Valiani painted figures for quadratura of Vincenzo Martinelli in the palazzo Agucchi. In 1805, he worked alongside Antonio Basoli and Palagi in the decoration of Palazzo Gozzadini. He also collaborated with Basoli in the decoration of the Teatro Felicini. In Pistoia, he frescoed the ceiling of a room in Villa Ippoliti, depicting Bacchus and Ariadne; he also painted a fresco depicting La disfida di Barletta (1842) for the Teatro dè Risvegliati.
