= Luigi Busatti =

Italian painter

Luigi Busatti (1763 – 30 June 1821), also known as Luigi Bussatti, was an Italian painter and scenic designer from Bologna. He trained under Vincenzo Martinelli. Busatti excelled in landscapes.

== Biography ==
He painted in the Palazzo Hercolani in Bologna, and in the Certosa where he decorated the monument to Martinelli, collaborating with Pietro Fancelli. He designed theatrical scenery for Teatro Zagnoni, Teatro Comunale, the Nuovo Teatro del Corso, and the Teatro Contavalli, and in Florence for the Teatro della Pergola. He taught landscape art at the Academy of Fine Arts of Bologna.
