= Giovanni Battista Frulli =

Italian painter

Giovanni Battista Sangiorgi (1765–1837) was an Italian painter of the Neoclassical period.

He was born in Bologna. After a formal classic education, he trained under his uncle, Nicola Toselli, then under Ubaldo Gandolfi and the Accademia Clementina. At the academy, he won a number of prizes painting nude figures.

He was active in the decoration of various palaces in Bologna, including the Palazzo Hercolani, Palazzo Gnudi, casa Buratti, and Palazzo Ranuzzi. He painted a number of monuments for the Certosa of Bologna, of which those of Brunetti and Tanari, remain. He worked in restorations and engravings of famous works. He helped restore The Ecstasy of St. Cecilia by Raphael now at the Pinacoteca Nazionale of Bologna. He was professor of figure at the university and then the Academy of Fine Arts of Bologna. He was awarded honorary membership in the Roman Accademia di San Luca. Frulli died in Bologna.
