= Vincenzo Martinelli =

Italian painter (1737–1807)

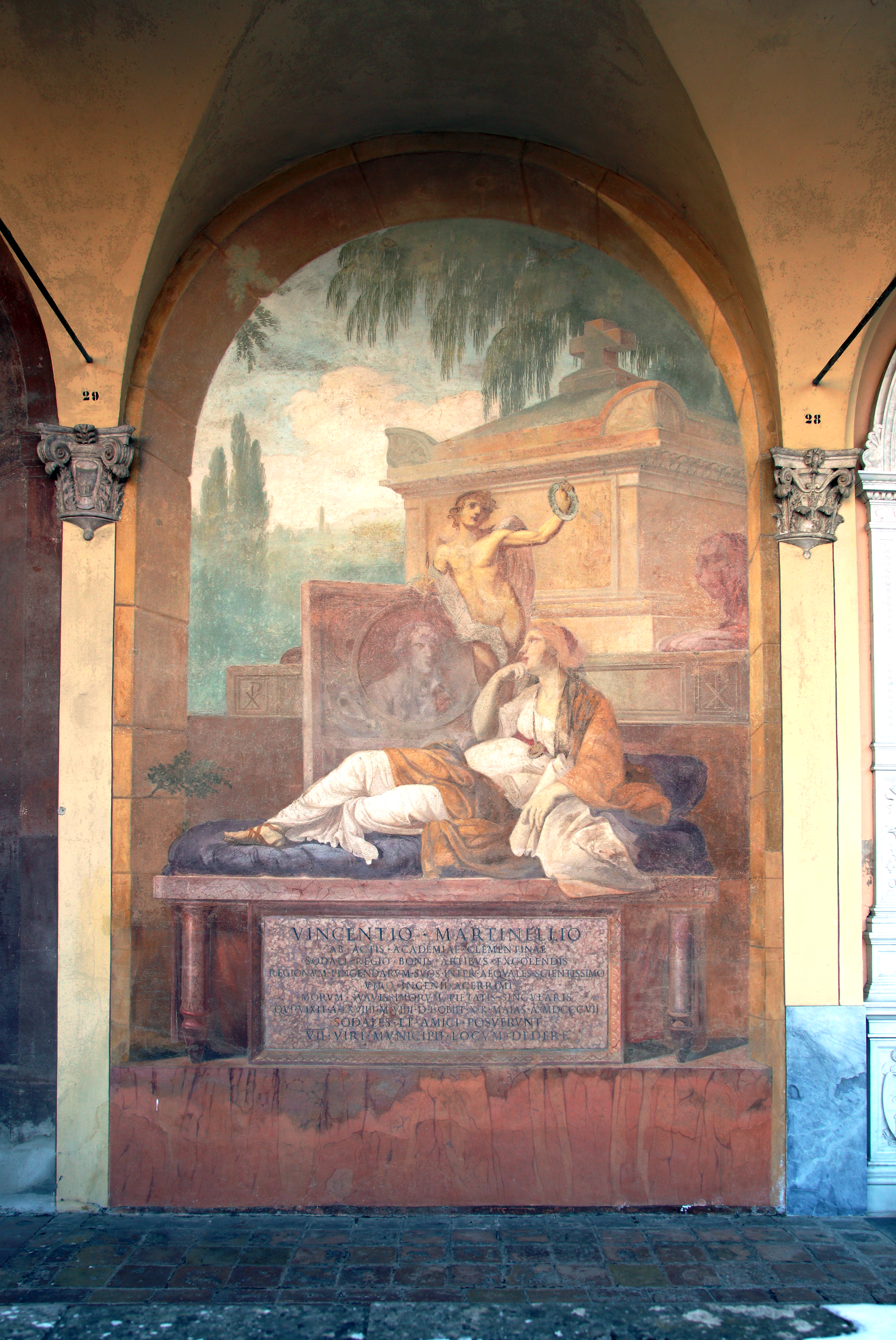
- Grave of Vincenzo Martinelli, Certosa di Bologna, Cloister III
- Born: June 20, 1737; Bologna, Papal States
- Died: 20 April 1807 (aged 69); Bologna, Papal States
- Education: Carlo Lodi
- Occupation: Painter
- Known for: Landscape painting
- Movement: Neoclassicism

Vincenzo Martinelli (20 June 1737 – 20 April 1807) was an Italian painter mainly painting landscapes both on canvas and fresco, mainly in his native Bologna. Among his frescoes are the stanzas painted alla boschereccia (forest style) located in the apartment of the Legate, now home to the Collezioni Comunali d'Arte.

== Biography ==
Vincenzo Martinelli was born in Bologna on 20 June 1737. He was a nephew and pupil of Carlo Lodi, and a member of the Accademia Clementina from 1759 to 1762. He worked for a long period with his uncle, and on the latter’s death inherited the workshop and continued the tradition of decorative landscape painting. His works are more naturalistic, particularly in their treatment of light and shade, than Lodi’s arcadian scenes, as is evident in the Landscape with the Villa Boschi (1766; Bologna, Villa La Sampiera). Similar characteristics inform the three tempera paintings, with figures by Nicola Bertucci, in the Casino Marsigli, Bologna.

In 1769 Martinelli was in Parma, on the occasion of Ferdinand I, Duke of Parma’s marriage to Maria Amalia of Austria, and subsequently visited several European capital cities, producing a vast number of decorative landscapes, often in collaboration with figure painters such as Domenico Pedrini, Filippo Pedrini, Emilio Manfredi and Gaspare Bigari. He also worked as a scene painter for theatres in Bologna.

Towards the end of the 1770s Martinelli’s style changed, and, through his contact with contemporary Venetian artists, he lightened his palette and created more spacious landscapes, as in the Coastal View with Gypsy Encampment (Pinacoteca Nazionale di Bologna) and in the tempera paintings of scenes from the Life of Moses in the Palazzo del Monte Matrimonio, Bologna, with figures by Filippo Pedrini. His decoration of the Palazzo Dondi and his scenes of Dido and Aeneas in the Palazzo Salina, with quadratura by Petronio Fancelli and figures by Pietro Fabbri, are characterized by more vivid colour and stronger tonal contrasts.

Martunelli collaborated with Giuseppe Jarmorini in painting frescoes in the Courtyard of the Palace once belonging to Bolognetti on via San Felice and the landscapes in the Allegory of Commerce (1793) painted with the collaboration of Filippo Pedrini in the Palazzo Pallavacini on the same street. He painted scenes in tempera at the Palazzo Bentivoglio di via Belle Arti.

Later he enjoyed a long collaboration with Pietro Fancelli and moved towards Neoclassicism, a development in harmony with the naturalism of his landscape painting. Martinelli taught from 1767 to 1803 at the Accademia Clementina. He and some of his colleagues were excluded after 1804 from the reformed Accademia Nazionale delle Belle Arti.

Martinelli's output was prolific and his pupils numerous. Among them were Antonio Basoli and Luigi Busatti who, in 1805, worked with him on the decorations for the festivities organized to welcome Napoleon Bonaparte to Bologna.

== Bibliography ==
- Giordani, Pietro (1809). Elogio di Vincenzo Martinelli nell’Accademia di Belle Arti in Bologna. Bologna.
