= Teatro Contavalli, Bologna =

Opera house in Bologna

Coordinates: 44.497222°N 11.346667°E

The Teatro Contavalli was an opera house and theatre located at Via Mentana #2, in Bologna, region of Emilia-Romagna, Italy. Long since utilised as a theatre, the site is now occupied by offices for the Centro Italiano di Documentazione sulla Cooperazione e L' Economia Sociale.

== History ==
The theatre was inaugurated on 3 October 1814, under the patronage of doctor and entrepreneur, Antonio Contavalli, in a lot that once formed part of the Carmelite convent affiliated with the church of San Martino. The engineer was Giovanni Battista Martinetti and the architect was Giuseppe Nadi. The entrance was the stairwell entrance to the monastery, but the three-storey, newly built hall, seating up to 800 attendees, and the theatre curtain were decorated with paintings by Antonio Basoli. Other portions were decorated by Pietro Fancelli, Luigi Cini, Ridolfo Fantuzzi, and Mauro Berti. The stucco work was by Pietro Trifoglio. The style of the decoration was described as Pompeian (19th-century interpretation of Ancient Roman motifs) in style.

The initial premiere featured Matilde ossia la Selvaggia by Carlo Coccia. Soon after the theatre premiered the opera, L'Italiana in Algeri by Rossini and sung by Maria Marcolini, proved to be successful, and moved to the Teatro Comunale and the Teatro al Corso. In 1816, the opera house put on a performance of Barbiere di Siviglia, also by Rossini; and this house was often used to present plays by Rossini in Bologna, such as Matilde di Shabran o sia Bellezza e Cuor di ferro.

In 1824, the Accademia Filodrammatica, led by the Marquis Massimiliano Angelelli, decided to focus on classic theatrical performances. This caused dissenting members to form a faction opposed to the purists, with the support of the Cardinal Legate; they formed the Società dei Concordi, which patronised modern works, often with controversial political overtones, at the Contavalli. In 1876, a new production company, the Accademia Filodrammatica Albergati was formed under Marchese Gioacchino Napoleone Pepoli, and affiliated with this theatre.

In 1888 Alfredo Testoni, with the help of the Società del Dottor Balanzone, who was affiliated with the Contavalli, formed a company dedicated to performances in local dialect and vernacular. Among the players were Argia and Guglielmina Magazzari, Augusto Galli, and Carlo Musi. The first work they sponsored was a comedy in Bolognese dialect titled Pisuneint (Pigionanti) by Testoni.

By 1909, Testoni had joined the theatre company with Goffredo Galliani (1857-1933), and they performed Acqua e ciacher in the then-refurbished Contavalli theatre. It presented many performances by Angelo Gandolfi (1886-1942). However, the theatre company was soon splintered by acrimony between the actors. The theatre continued under Galliani until 1938, when it became a cinema, until 1979, when it was functioning as a cinema for pornographic films (cinema a luci rossi). The theatre hall no longer exists.
