= Giacomo Venturoli =

17th-century Italian mathematician

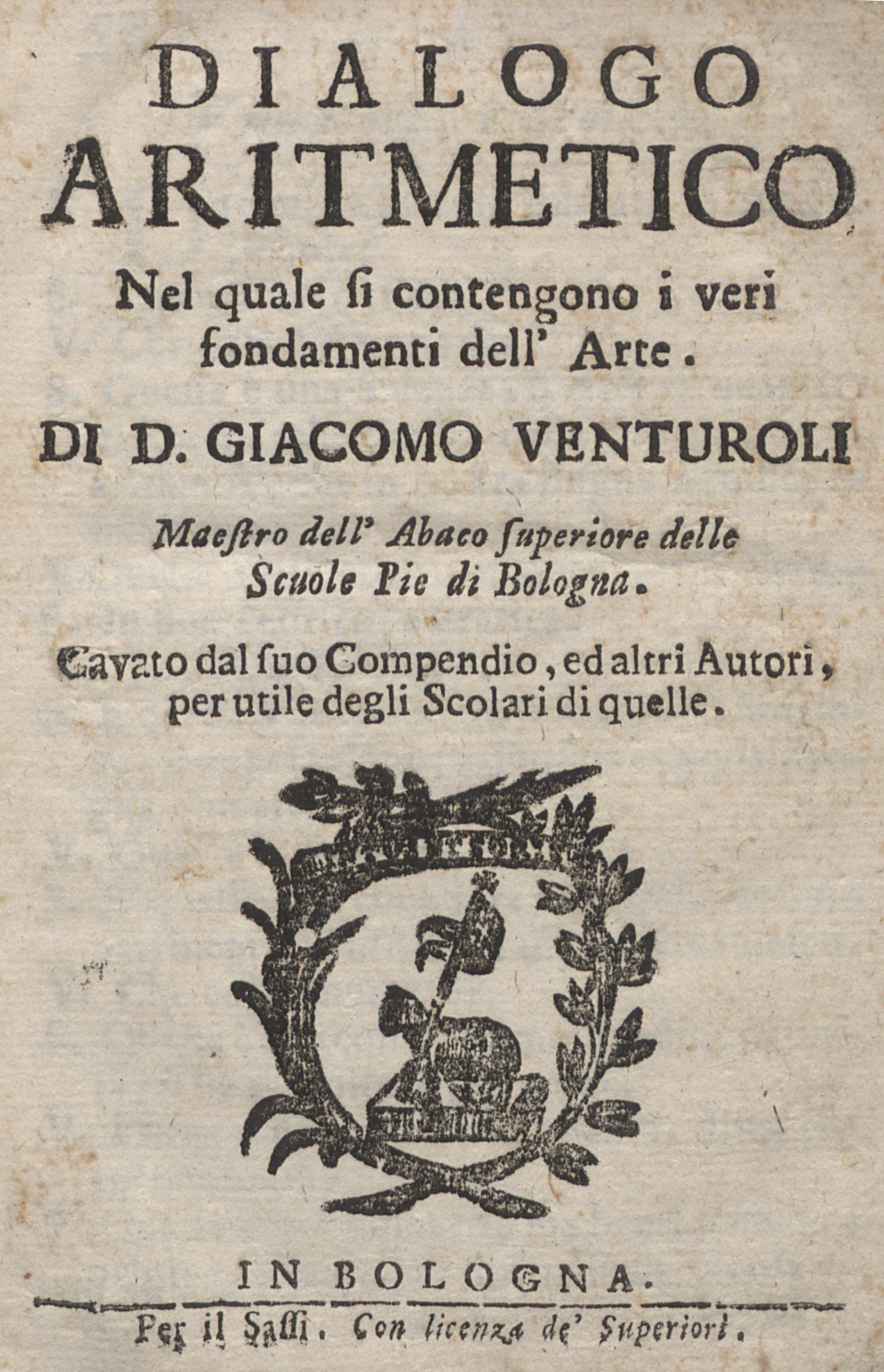
Dialogo aritmetico (1664)

Giacomo Venturoli was a 17th-century Italian mathematician.

== Life ==
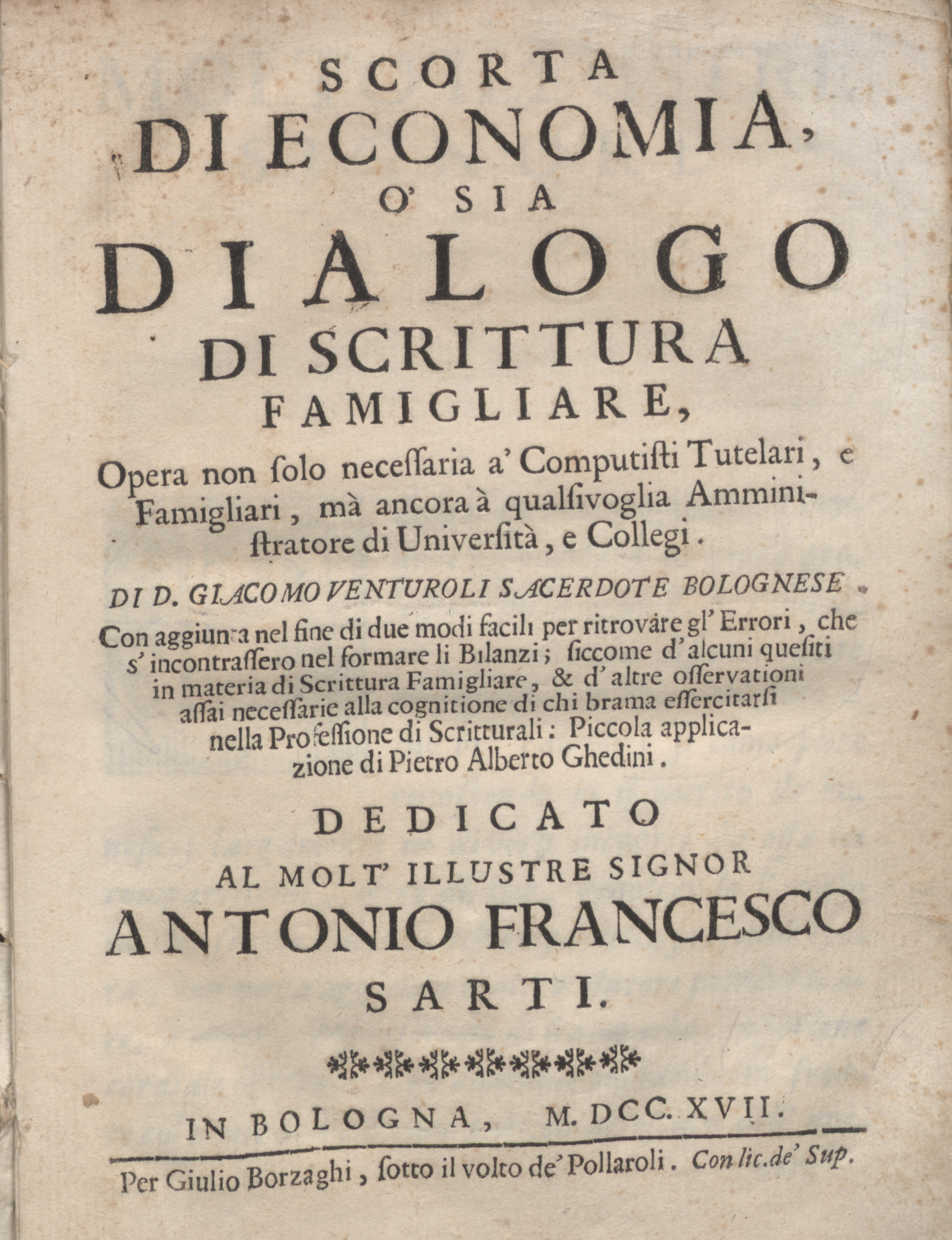
Scorta di economia (1717)

Venturoli was a priest and taught arithmetic. He wrote mainly about accountancy, contributing to the definition and promotion of this newly established discipline. In his book Scorta di economia, he mentioned as references the works by Angelo Pietra and by Domenico Manzoni.

== Works ==
- Dialogo aritmetico. Nel quale si contengono i veri fondamenti dell'Arte (in Italian). Bologna: Clemente Maria Sassi. 1664.
- Scorta di economia, ò sia dialogo di scrittura famigliare (in Italian). Bologna: Giulio Borzaghi. 1717.
- Breve compendio di tutte le regole dell'aritmetica pratica aggiuntovi nuove osservazioni con tutte le regole della geometria pratica (in Italian). Bologna: Stamperia del Longhi. 1754.
