= Palazzo Hercolani =

Building in Forlì, Italy

Coordinates: 44°13′30″N 12°02′15″E

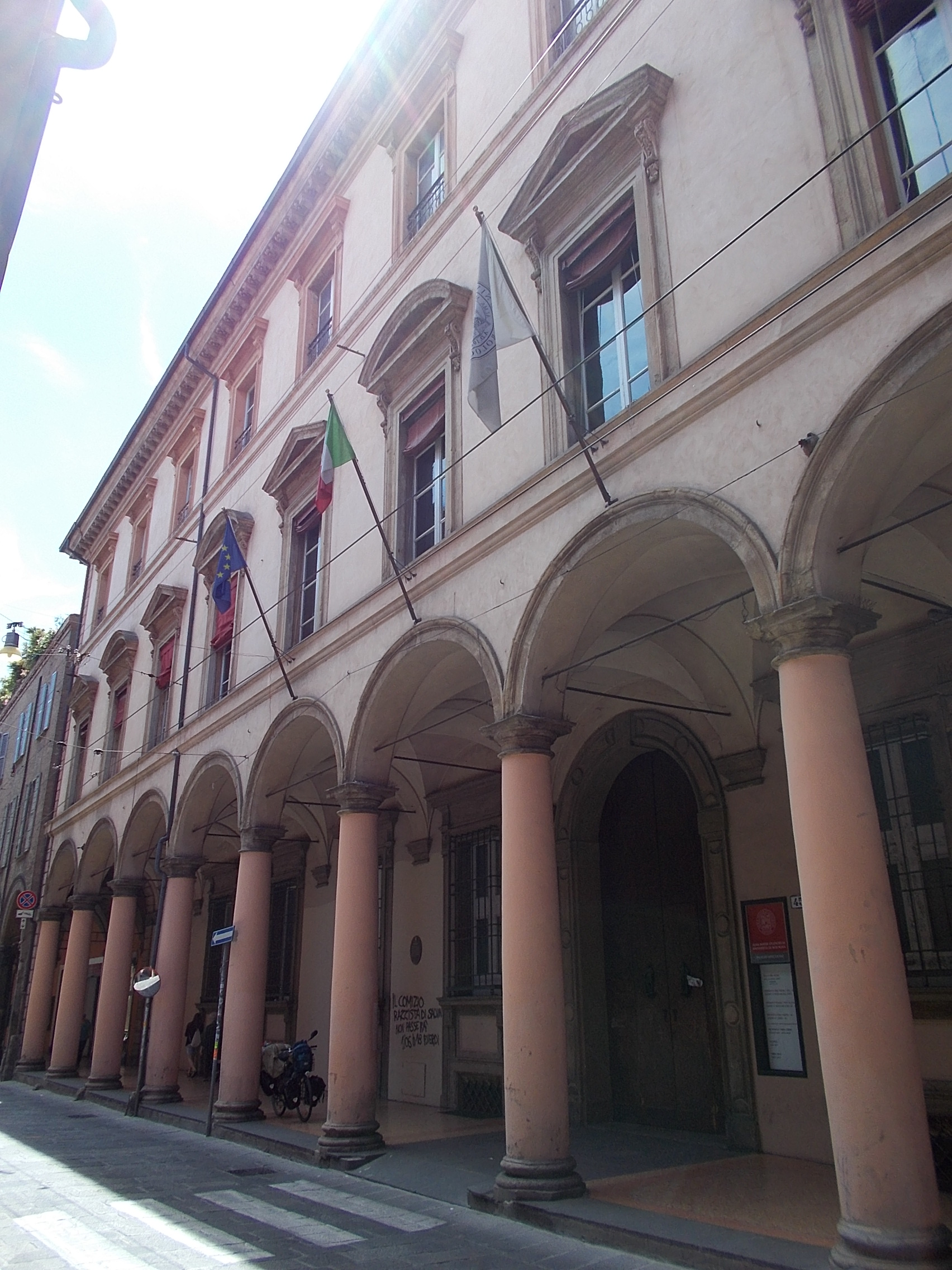
Palazzo Hercolani in Forlì

Palazzo Hercolani is a palace in Forlì, Emilia-Romagna, Italy. There is also a Palazzo Hercolani in Bologna.

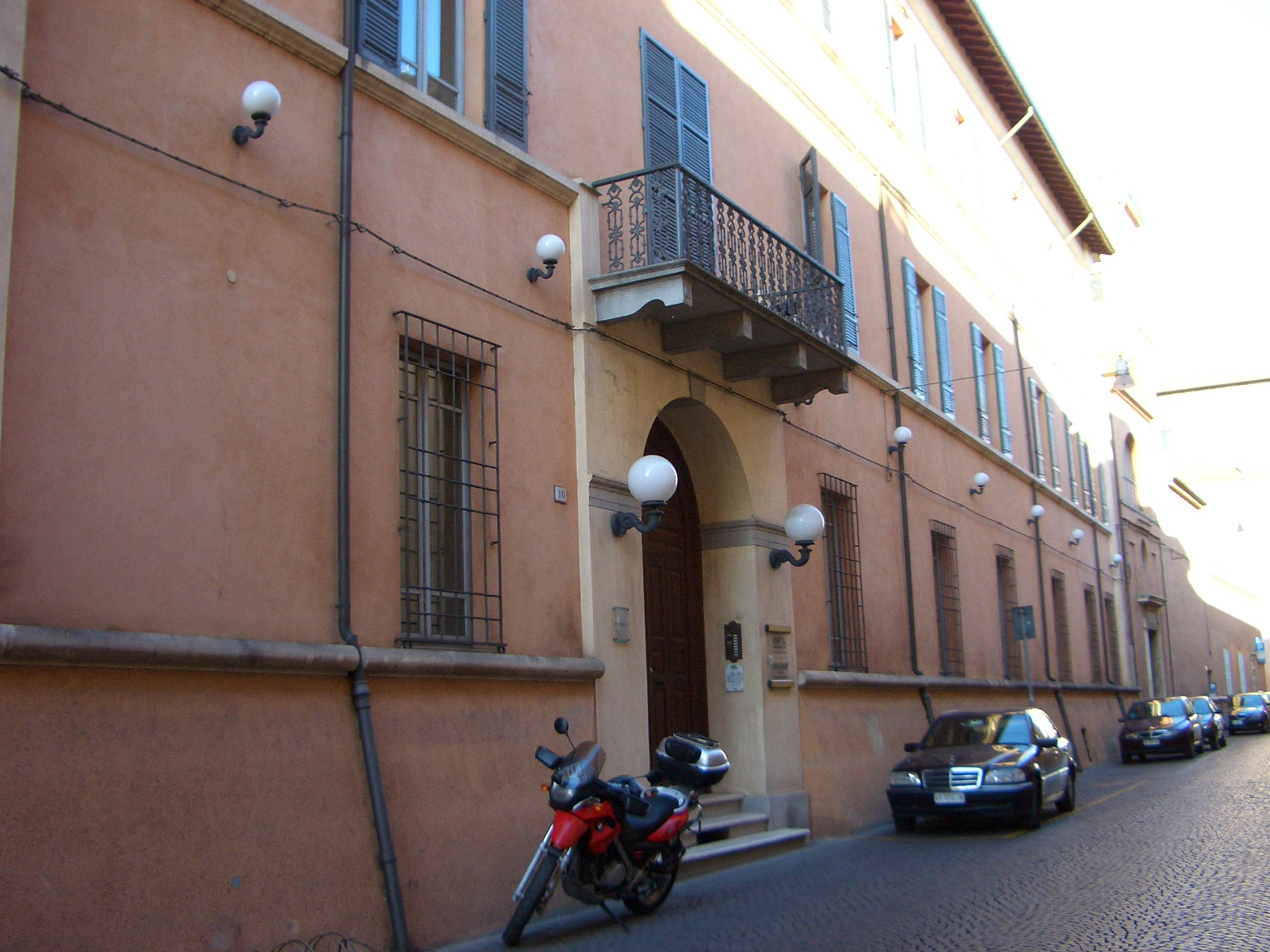

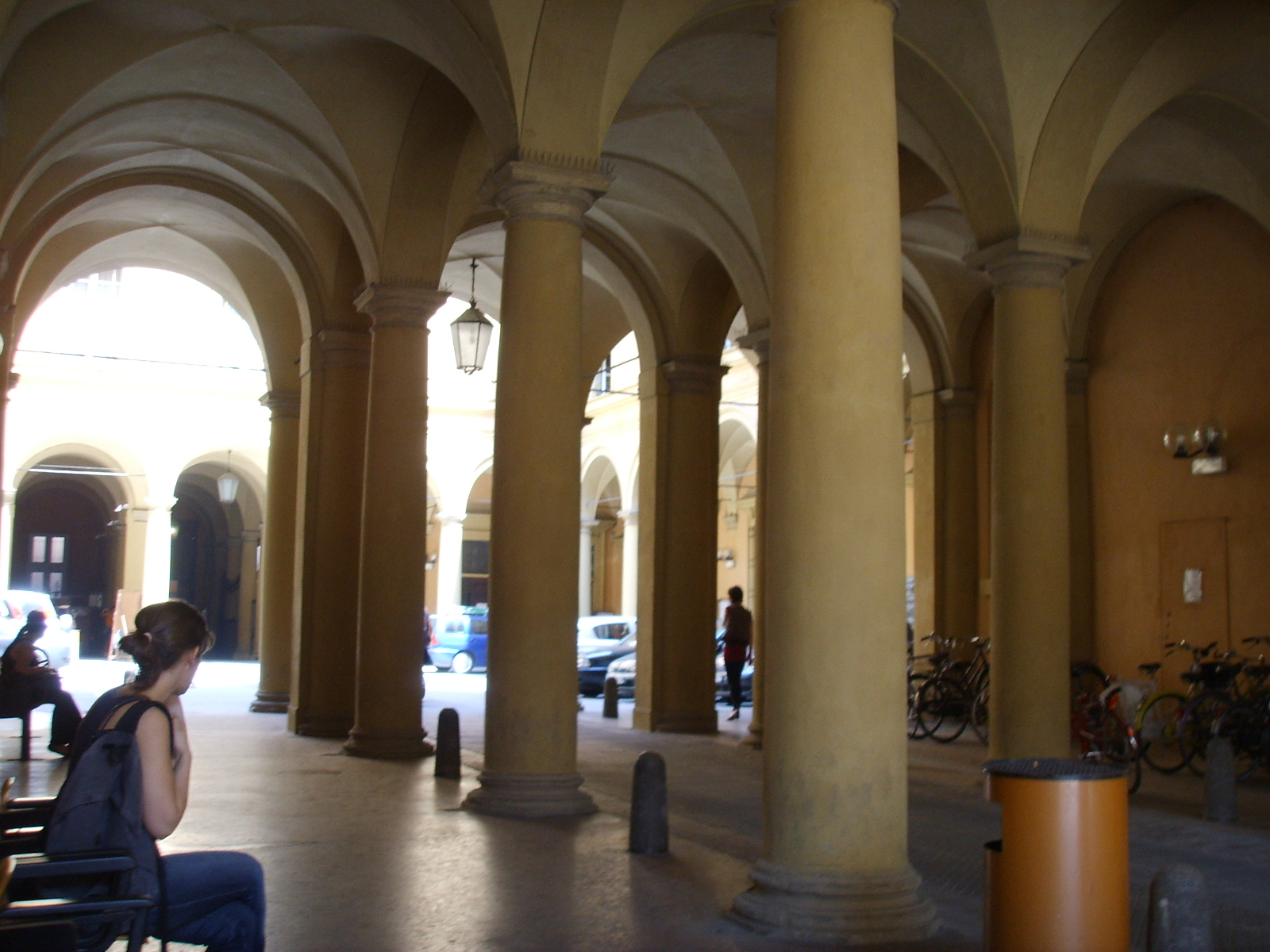
Portico of the inner courtyard of the palace

Until 1844 it belonged to the ancient Hercolani Family of Forlì. The last Hercolani heir living in the palace was Fabrizio Gaddi Hercolani, son of Cesarina Hercolani and Lepido Gaddi Hercolani. In 1844 Fabrizio sold the palace to Count Sesto Matteucci, who engaged in a great number of renovations, although the palace plan was still left unchanged.

The palace was the product of the unification of three different buildings. Sesto Matteucci gave the palace front a more homogeneous look and improved the palace facilities and decorum.

In 1866 the palace became a possession of the Guarini family, when Vittoria Matteucci marries Count Filippo Guarini. In 1946 the palace was sold by last Guarini heirs to the cooperative society Karl Marx.

The palace houses a work of the Italian painter Pompeo Randi named La Beata Vergine del Fuoco con i Santi Mercuriale, Pellegrino, Marcolino e Valeriano, showing the Sesto Matteucci coat of arms and a landscape of Forlì on the background. On the whole the palace houses six frescoed roofs and two more wall frescoes. All decorations go back to the 19th century.

During the 1980s the palace was renovated by Assicoop Romagna, which has currently its seat in the palace. For its unique elegance and facilities, the palace often hosts important events occurring in the town.
