= Luigi Basoli =

Italian painter

Luigi Basoli (1776–1848) was an Italian painter, active mainly as an ornamental fresco painter.

== Biography ==
Born in Castel Guelfo to a family of painters, he moved to Bologna in 1802 to work alongside his older brother, Antonio Basoli. He joined the Accademia Clementina, in 1803, when his brother obtained a teaching position for ornamentation. In 1805, he helped decorate the Casa Fabri. When his brother Antonio, left for Rome, he began to obtain what had once been the latter's commissions.

In 1810, along with brothers Antonio and Francesco, he helped complete two scenes and a theater curtain (sipario) for a theater in Macerata. Luigi was named honorary associate of the Bolognese Academy of Fine Arts, and described as an ornamental painter. In later years, his brother Antonio was to describe the collaboration between the three brothers, Luigi, Francesco, and himself, as respectively: ornamentation, figure painting, and design. Luigi Basoli died in Bologna in 1849.
