= Pietro Fancelli =

Italian painter

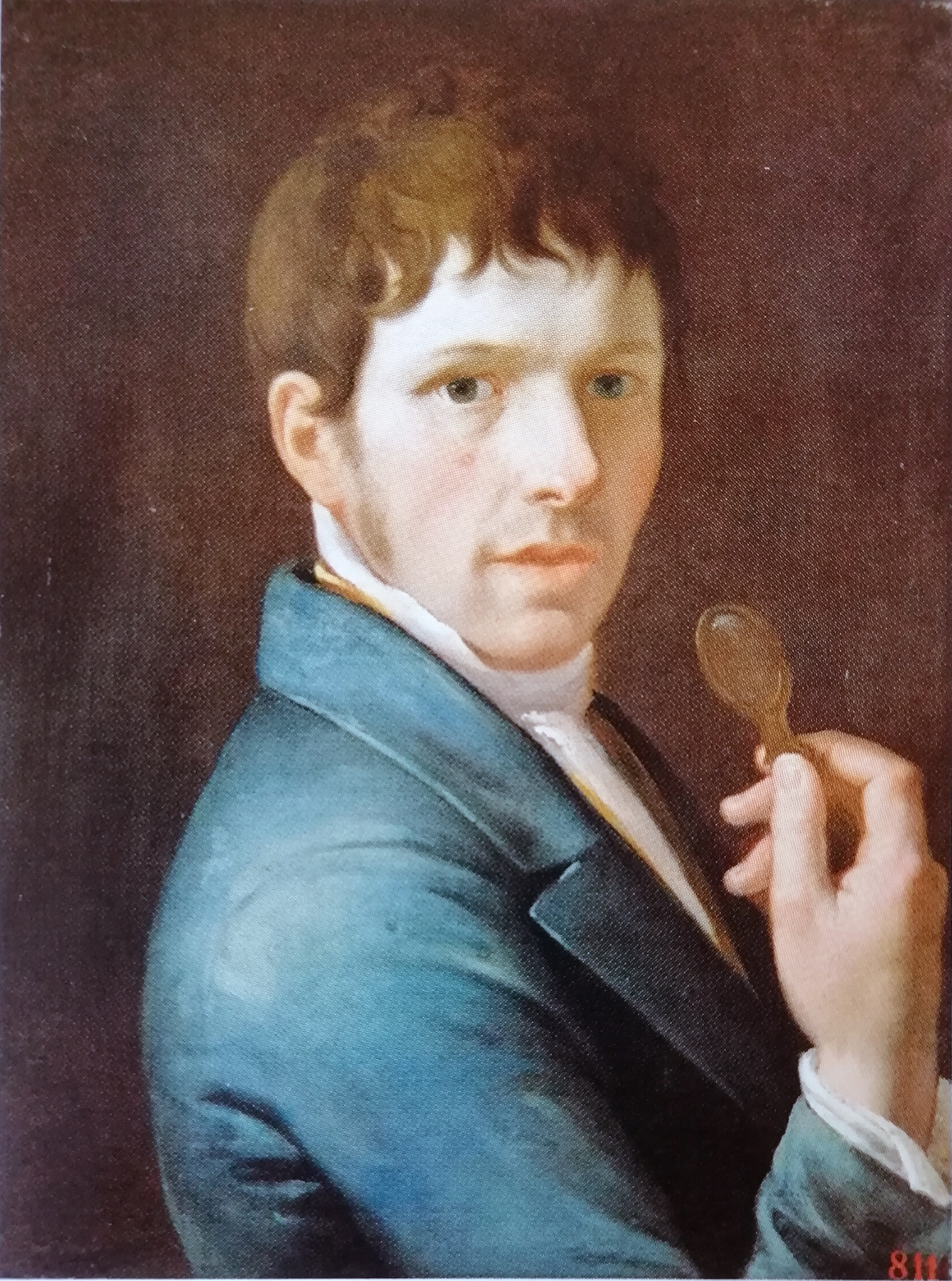
- Pietro Fancelli self-portrait
- Born: 18 May 1764
- Died: 22 January 1850 (aged 85)

Pietro Fancelli (18 May 1764 – 22 January 1850) was an Italian painter and set-designer.

== Biography ==
Pietro was born in Bologna to Petronio, a quadraturista, and Orsola Benedelli. Petronio moved the family to Venice in 1774, and his son worked with the father and a painter from Brescia called Lodovico Gallina. On returning to Bologna, he trained at the Accademia Clementina, winning the Marsigli Aldrovandi prize in 1784. In 1785, his Death of Virginia won a further award.

He became faculty at the Clementine Academy of Fine Arts in 1791, and assumed the vice presidency with Antonio Beccadelli in 1793–94. He played a role in trying to prevent Napoleonic forces from looting the artworks from suppressed monasteries and churches. After the Accademia Clementina was converted into the National Academy of Fine Arts in 1804, Fancelli joined but without a regular teaching appointment. In Bologna and in surrounding towns, he continued to paint altarpieces, portraits and scenic design for the theater.

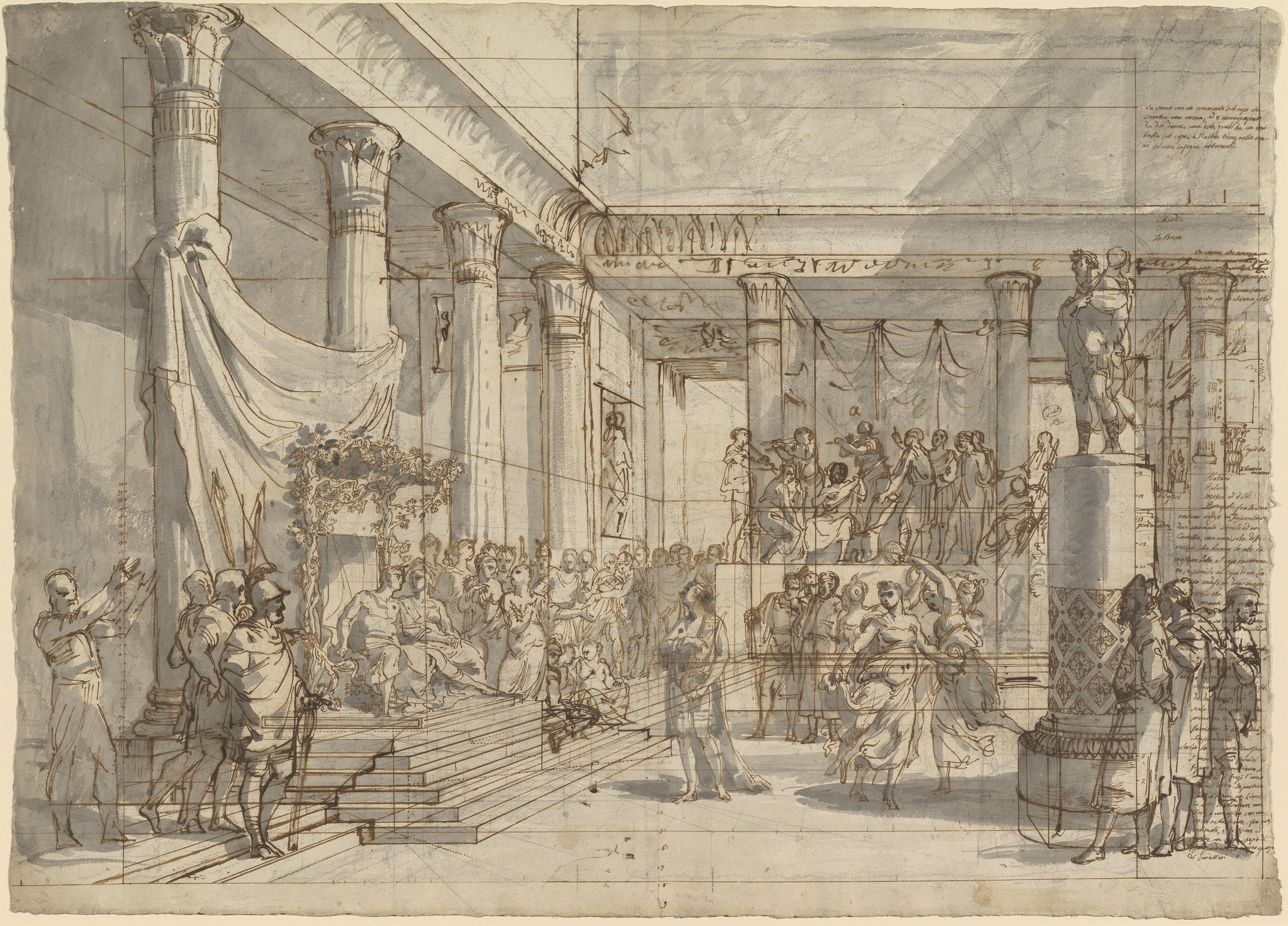
Pietro Fancelli, Timotheus Playing the Lyre before Alexander and Thaïs in the Hall of the Palace at Persepolis, c. 1820

Over the years he collaborated in the decoration of palaces with a number of local artists including Vincenzo Martinelli, Gaetano Caponeri, Bartolomeo Valiani, and Onofrio Zanotti. Among the Bolognese palaces he painted, they include the Palazzo Gnudi Scagliarini, Palazzo Grabinski, Palazzo Aldini Sanguinetti, Palazzo Tanari, Palazzo Hercolani, and the Palazzo Arcivescovile. He also painted in surrounding villas, such as Villa Pallavicini Malpighi, Villa Sorra, Villa Contri, and Villa Benelli Valmy).

He worked often with Martinelli, a follower of the Bolognese tradition of landscape, making many of the figures in his paintings in tempera. He made curtains painted with mythological or historical themes, according to the taste of the time, for various theaters of Bologna (Communale, Contavalli, and Teatro del Corso) and that of Ascoli Piceno.

At the Certosa di Bologna, in collaboration with other artists, he painted several tombs (Tartagni Marvelli, Magnani, Bargellini, Gnugni, Borghi, Cospi, Conti Castello, Malvezzi) among which that of Martinelli, his friend and workmate, set in a landscape that evokes those painted by the artist in life. He moved to Pesaro in the last years of his life, and died there in 1850.

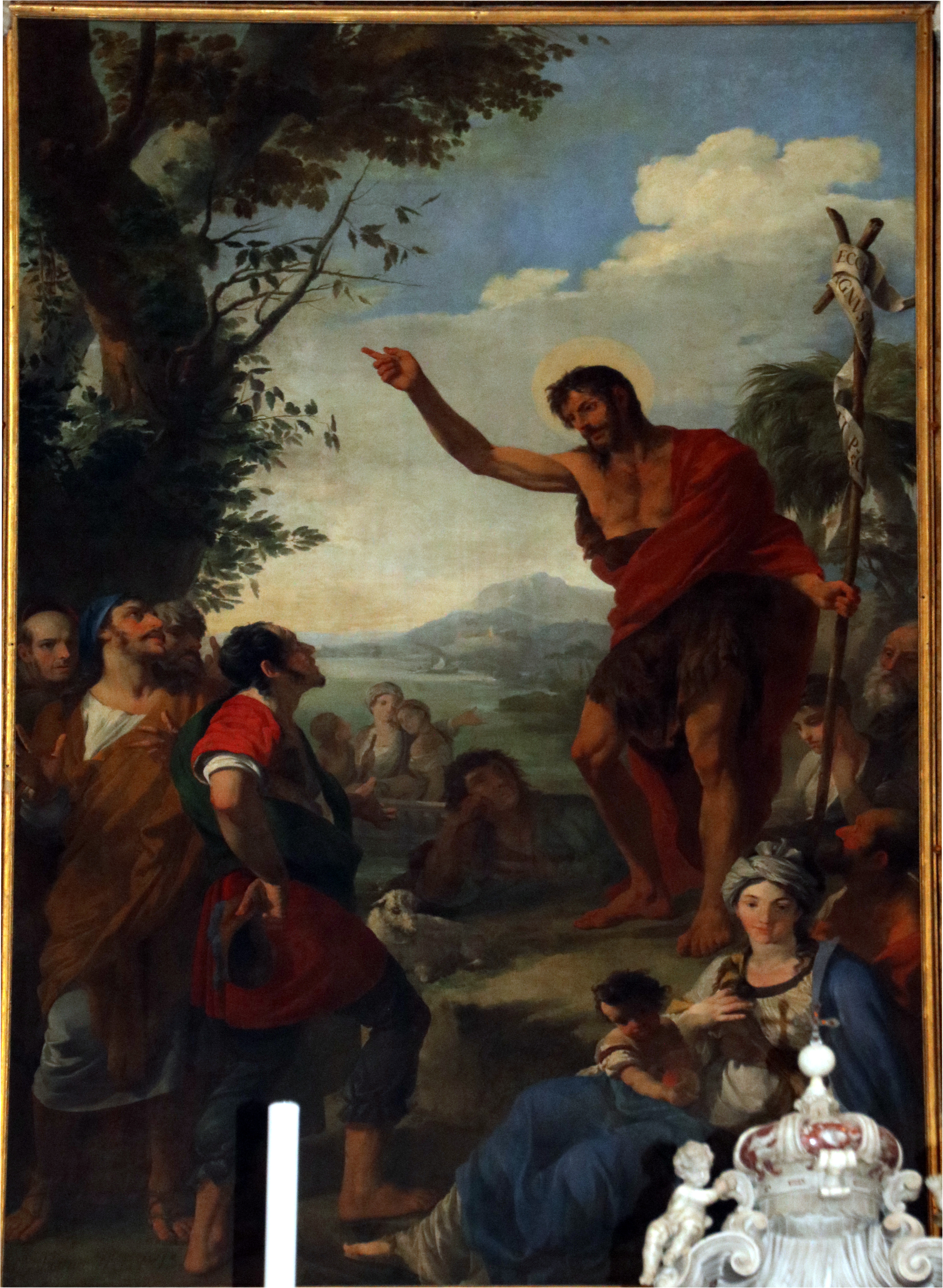
Pietro Fancelli, Saint John the Baptist preaching to the crowds on the banks of the Jordan, 1813–1815, Chiesa di San Giovanni Battista (Minerbio, Italy)

Among his works are a painting of the Stigmata of St Francis (1796) for the church of St Francis of Faenza; a painting of Saints Vincent Ferrer and Filippo Benizzi (1798) for San Giovanni in Persiceto; a Christ and the Maries and Crucifixion (1802) for the cycle of Mysteries of the Rosary in San Stefano in Bazzano. He painted a Charity of St Thomas of Villanova for San Giacomo Maggiore in Bologna; and a St Anne and the Virgin (1829) for Santa Maria Maggiore in Bologna.

By 1797, he had completed the mythologic scenes for the Villa Muratori-Guerrini-Meriggiano, in collaboration with the landscape artists Vincenzo Martinelli. This collaboration was continued in the Palazzo Hercolani (1802) and the Villa Pallavacini, later Coccapani Tacoli. They also collaborated in canvases found in the Weiss Collection in Bologna, also in tombs of the Certosa of Bologna.

He also was commissioned to decorate the scene of Felsina (Bologna) offering the keys of the city to Napoleon, part of transient decoration of triumphal arches celebrating the entrance of Napoleon Bonaparte to the City in 1805. Similar skills were used in works of scenic design for theatrical representations of Alessandro conquistatore della Persia (1820; Orloff, 1823; Giordani, 1855), and at the former Teatro Contavalli, the curtain depicting Marriage of Zeus and Hera; and theater of Corso, the Triumph of Sophocles.
