= Angelo Venturoli =

Italian architect (1749–1821)

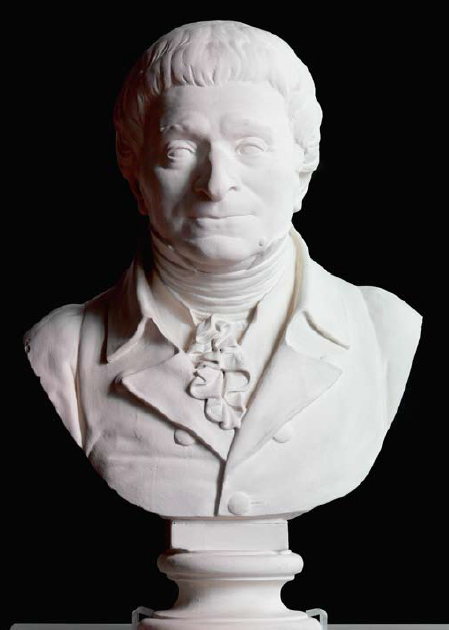
Angelo Venturoli Portrait

Angelo Venturoli (1749 – 7 March 1821 in Bologna) was an Italian architect.

He was born in Medicina in the Province of Bologna, and trained at the Accademia Clementina, under Petronio Fancelli. By 1781, he was an academic, and from 1786 to 1803, docent or teacher of architecture. In 1795, he was named director of the academy and Vice (1802 and 1803).

He was active as an architect in Bologna and the Veneto, including Castelfranco Emilia. Among architectural works are refurbishing and Neoclassical additions to the churches of San Giuliano and San Michele Arcangelo, the entrance and Atrium of the palazzo Hercolani, the entrance to Villa Sardini (1777) at Pieve Santo Stefano, and Villa Hercolani. Among his collaborators, was the sculptor Giacomo De Maria (1762–1838). With the help of Carlo Bianconi, Marchese Antonio Bolognini Amorini, Count Luigi Salini, and Signor Carlo Savini, as well as with Angelo's endowment, the helped found the Collegio Artistico Angelo Venturoli in Bologna in 1825.
