= Giuseppe Valiani =

Italian painter

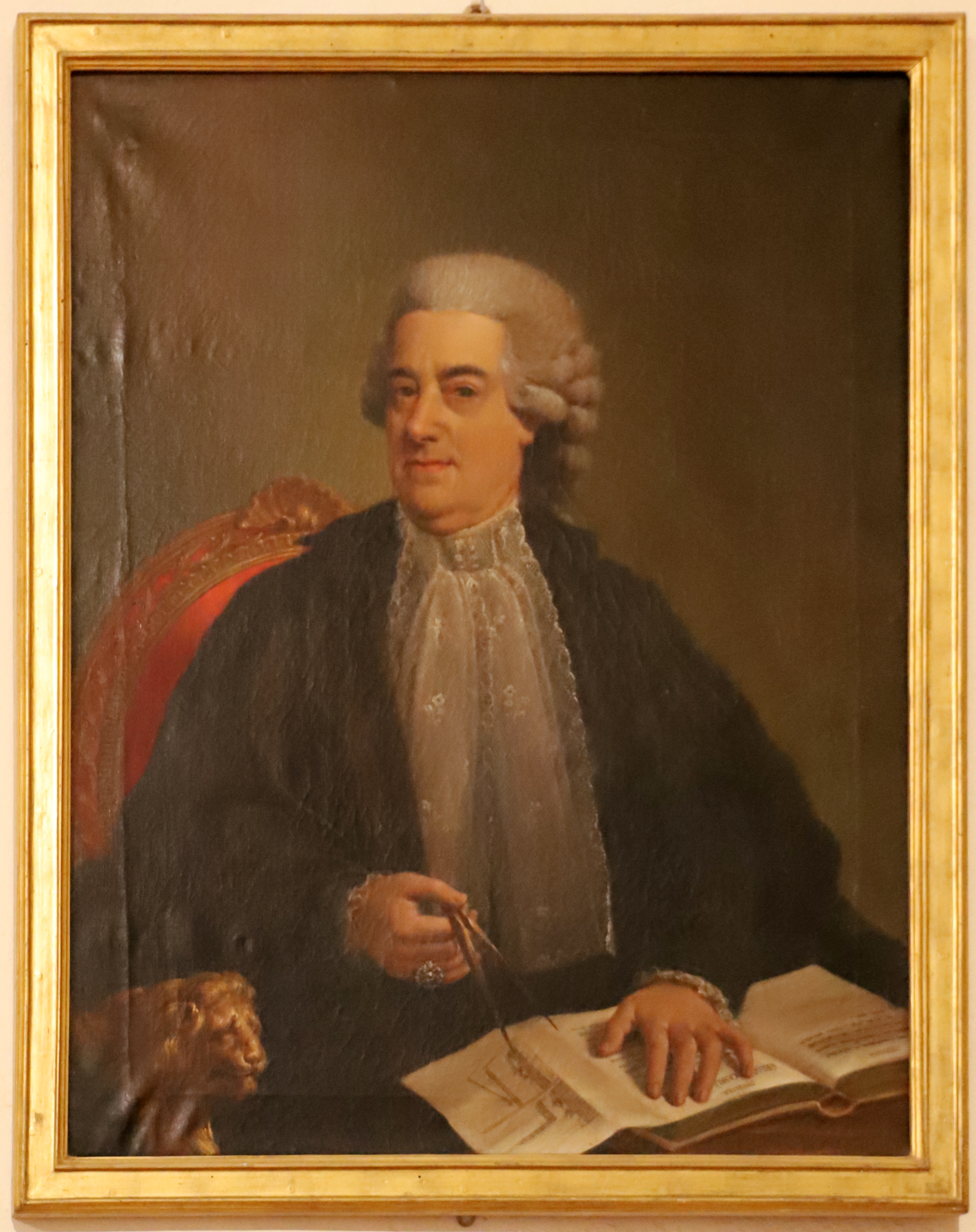
Giuseppe Valiani, Portrait of Gregorio Filippo Maria Casali Bentivoglio Paleotti, 1790

Giuseppe Valiani (26 April 1730 in Pistoia – 26 April 1800) was an Italian painter.

== Biography ==
He was a pupil of Vincenzo Meucci in Florence. He then traveled with Marchese Francesco Albergati to Bologna, for whom he painted mythological subjects in the Villa at Zola Predosa; these frescoes are considered by many to be his masterpiece. In Bologna, he was soon admitted to the Accademia Clementina, where he was director and for a term, president. He also completed frescoes in houses in Bologna for the Tanari, Merendoni, Pallavicini, Bianchi, and Isolani families. In Venice he painted a ceiling in one of the theaters. In Pistoia, he painted frescoes for the Villa Ippoliti in Merlo, and the Villa Forteguerri in Spazzavento.

His nephew, Bartolomeo Valiani, was his pupil and also a painter.
