= Petronio Fancelli =

Italian painter

Petronio Fancelli (1734–1800) was an Italian painter, active mostly as an ornamental quadratura painter in Bologna.

== Biography ==
His father Gaetano Fancelli was a violincello player. Petronio trained with the architect Mauro Tesi. He collaborated with the figure painter Pietro Fabri. He painted for the Madonna della Consolazione, near the Porta Saragozza. He also painted in the Palazzo Bianchi. He decorated the main chapel in the parish church of Santa Agata, and the quadratura of the eight chapel. His son was the ornamental painter Pietro Fancelli.
