= Antonio Basoli =

Italian painter (1774–1848)

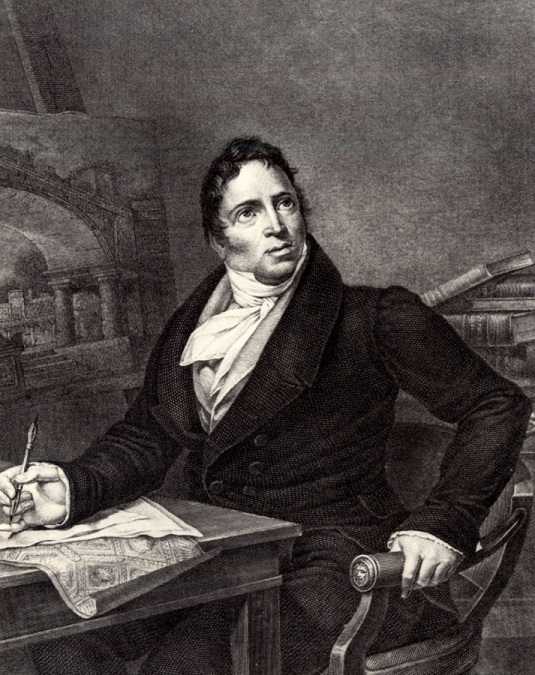
- Born: 18 April 1774 near Bologna, in Castel Guelfo di Bologna, Papal States
- Died: 30 May 1848 (aged 74) in Bologna, Papal States
- Years active: 1801-1842

Antonio Basoli (1774–1848) was an Italian painter, interior designer, scenic designer, and engraver, active mostly in Bologna.

== Biography ==
He was born in Castel Guelfo. His first teacher was his father, Lelio Andrea Basoli. His education was motivated by an insatiable and constant interest in classic art, classic and contemporary literature, and the works, decorations and inscriptions of Piranesi. He often worked alongside his brothers, Francesco and Luigi Basoli. From 1803 till his death, he became docent of ornamentation and the next year, professor at the Accademia delle Arti di Bologna until 1826. During his time at the Accademia he developed a close friendship with fellow pupils Domenico Corsini and Pelagio Palagi. He worked for a time in the studio of Petronio Fancelli.

== Works ==
In 1801–1803, he painted frescoes at a few sites in Friuli, including Casa Muratori in Trieste and a palace in Spilimbergo.

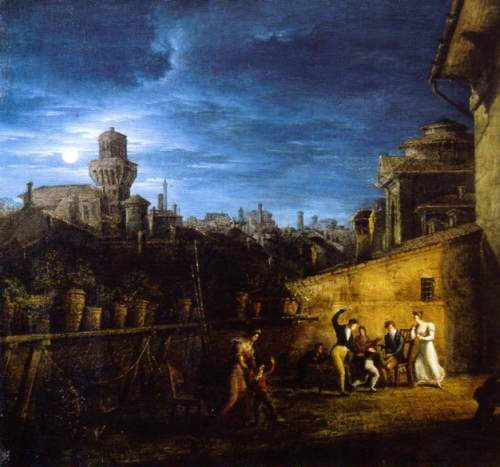
Torrazzo nel locale della Pontificia Accademia di Belle Arti, 1826, found in Vedute pittoresche della città di Bologna from 1833

Basoli worked as a set and curtain (sipario) designer, as well as decorator for various theatres around Bologna, such as the Marsigli Rossi Theatre, the Teatro Comunale di Bologna, and, in particular, the Teatro Contavalli (1814). Sadly, most of his works survive only through references to them, such as detailed production sketches, watercolours and engravings, among which the aquatints from Collezione di varie scene teatrali, started in 1821. In addition to his decorations at these theatres, he also decorated the Palazzo Rosselli del Turco, Palazzo Sanguinetti and Palazzo Hercolani.

Basoli was also offered commissions for scenography from theaters in Rome in 1815, and from Naples, by request of Gioacchino Rossini, in 1818 both of which he refused. However, in 1818 he did decide to take a trip to Milan, where he visited the sala Sanquirico the studio of the most important scenic designer of la Scala from which Basoli found inspiration for the set design for the opera Semiramide in 1820, the set for a production of Oedipus Rex at the Theater Contavalli in 1822, and lastly, the background paintings for the scenes at the Theater of Cavalieri dell’Unione in Santarcangelo di Romagna in 1822. During this same period, he produced, amongst others, important works at the villa Marescalchi, and the Palazzo Baciocchi.

Among his exhibitions at the Academy of Bologna were a collection of Romantic canvases with exotic themes. For example, in 1842, he exhibited a series of 16 oil paintings più affascinanti e immaginifici (very fascinating and imaginative), depicting: the four Colossi of Memnon in Egypt; the port of Rhodes (likely including the colossus); Nebuchadnezzar's Babylon (likely including hanging gardens), the famous Equestrian Statue of Domitian in Rome (destroyed in antiquity during his damnatio memorie). Paintings depicted four parts of the globe: Europe, Asia, Africa, and America; and five famous ancient temples, including Osiris and Isis in Egypt, the Foo temple in China, Zeus in Olympia, Diana in Ephesus. They also depicted a city of Pegù, now Burma, an Arab Tomb, the great hall of Charlemagne, and the magic palace of the sorceress Alcina.

Typical of his designs, merging art and erudition, he later created 26 vignette compositions, depicting an archaeological alphabet in the form of watercolours, called his Alfabeto pittorico.

== Publications ==
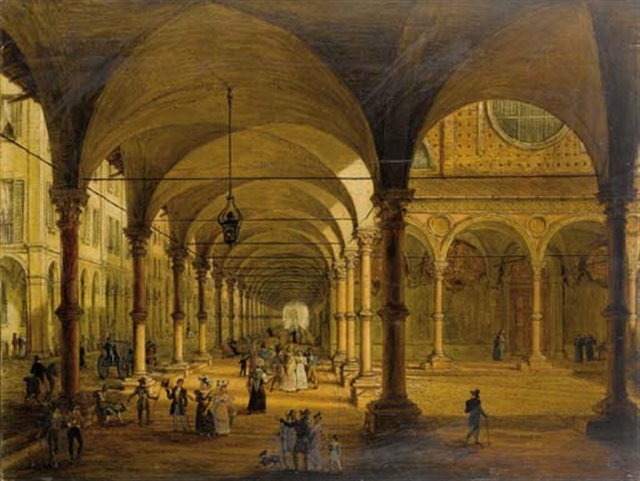
Veduta of the portico of Santa Maria dei Servi, 1836. There is a version from 1830 and another one from 1833, the latter found in Vedute pittoresche della città di Bologna.

- Raccolta di prospettive serie, rustiche e di paesaggio (1810)
- Guarnizioni diverse di maniera antica (1814)
- Porte della città di Bologna (1817)
- Esemplare di Elementi d'Ornato che contiene lo studio della pianta d'accanto (1817)
- Collezione di varie scene teatrali (1821)
- Compartimenti di camere (1827)
- Vedute pittoresche della città di Bologna (1833)
- Definizioni geometriche (1837)
- Raccolta di diversi ornamenti (1838)
- Alfabeto pittorico (1839)
