= Santa Maria della Neve =

Santa Maria della Neve, in English, Madonna of the Snow or Snows, is a title of Marian veneration for Mary, mother of Jesus

Santa Maria della Neve may also refer to: Saint Mary of the snows

== Churches ==
- Santa Maria della Neve, Bologna, former Roman-Catholic church, in Bologna, Italy
- Santa Maria della Neve, or Our Lady of the Snows, the dedication and alternative name for Santa Maria Maggiore, Roman Catholic papal basilica in Rome
- Santa Maria della Neve, Pisogne, Roman Catholic church in Pisogne, Italy
- Santa Maria della Neve al Portico, Roman Catholic church and convent located in Florence, Italy

== See also ==
- Santa Maria (disambiguation)
