= Zambeccari =

Zambeccari is an Italian surname. Notable people with the surname include:

- Count Francesco Zambeccari (1752–1812), Italian aviator
- Giuseppe Zambeccari (1655–1728), Italian physician and anatomist
- Pompeo Zambeccari (1518–1571), Italian clergyman

Notable buildings linked to the aristocratic Zambeccari family in Bologna was:

- Palazzo Zambeccari, Bologna
- Biblioteca Zambeccari near the former-church of Santa Lucia, Bologna
