= Alfonso Lombardi =

Italian sculptor

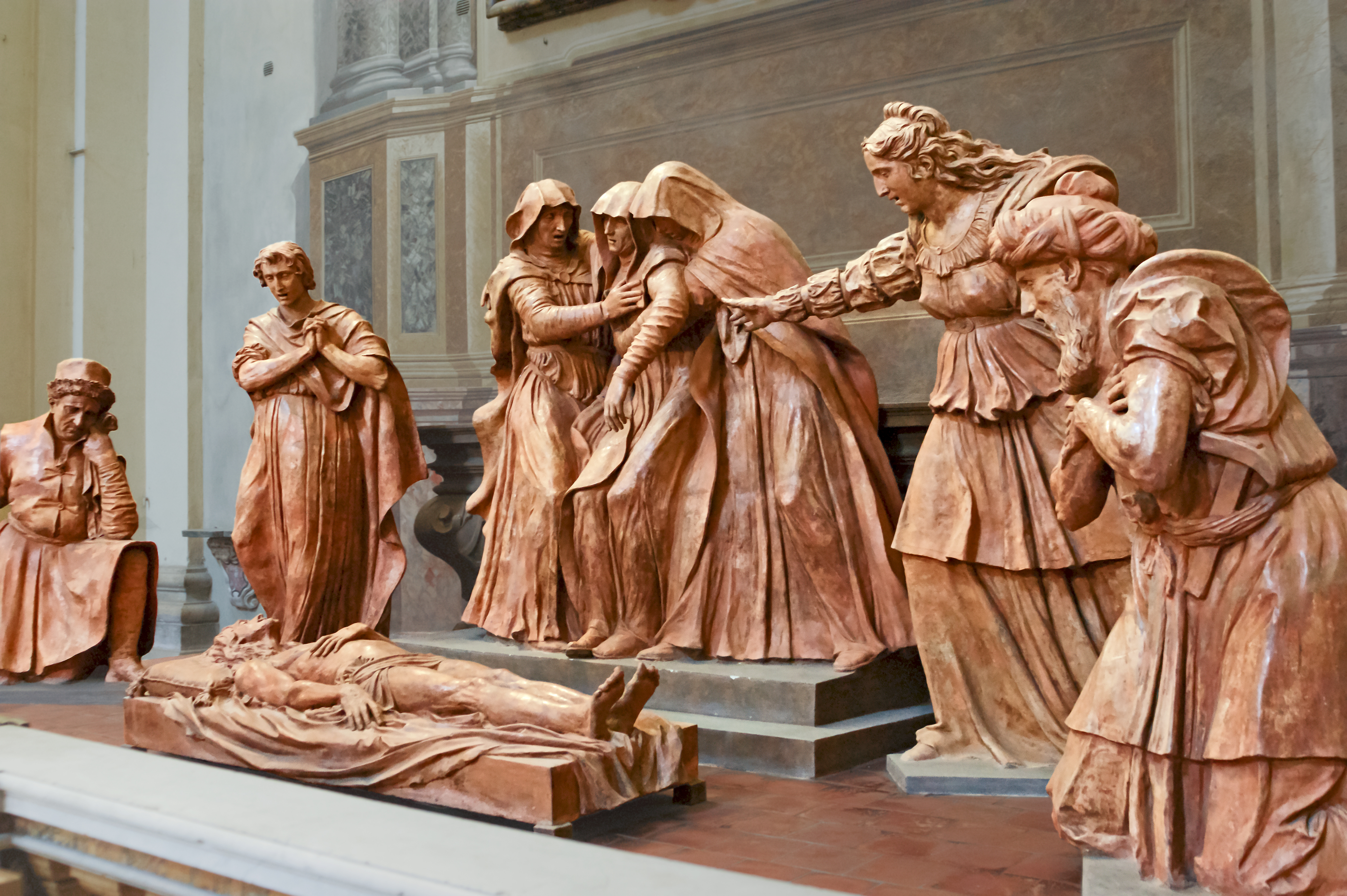
Lamentation of Christ, c. 1522–1526, Bologna Cathedral

Alfonso Lombardi (c. 1497 – 1537), also known as Lombardi da Lucca, Alfonso da Ferrara and as Alfonso Lombardo, was an Italian sculptor and medallist who was born in Ferrara, Italy, in 1497, and died in Bologna in 1537. He was very active in Bologna where he created a number of works that are still present in the most important churches of that city. Giorgio Vasari dedicated a chapter to Lombardi in his Vite.

== Works ==
In his birthplace of Ferrara, Italy, Lombardi entered into his artistic apprenticeship, working with plaster and terracotta—materials that he continued to prefer later in his life. He worked at the court of Alfonso I d'Este, Duke of Ferrara, where he executed portrait medals carved in stucco or wax and then cast in metal.

Lombardi relocated to Bologna around the age of twenty. Lombardi's statue of Hercules battling the Hydra, in terracotta, found in the Palazzo d'Accursio in Bologna, was completed in July 1519. In December of that same year, he was commissioned to create the large ensemble of Death of the Virgin for the Sanctuary of Santa Maria della Vita. The work, consisting of fourteen larger-than-life size terracotta figures in highly emotive poses, was likely completed in 1522.

Between 1522 and 1526 he executed other works in terracotta in Bologna: Lamentation of Christ (Bologna Cathedral), St Bartholomew (Santa Maria della Pioggia), and four terracotta statues of the Patron Saints (Torre dell'Arengo of the Palazzo del Podestà).

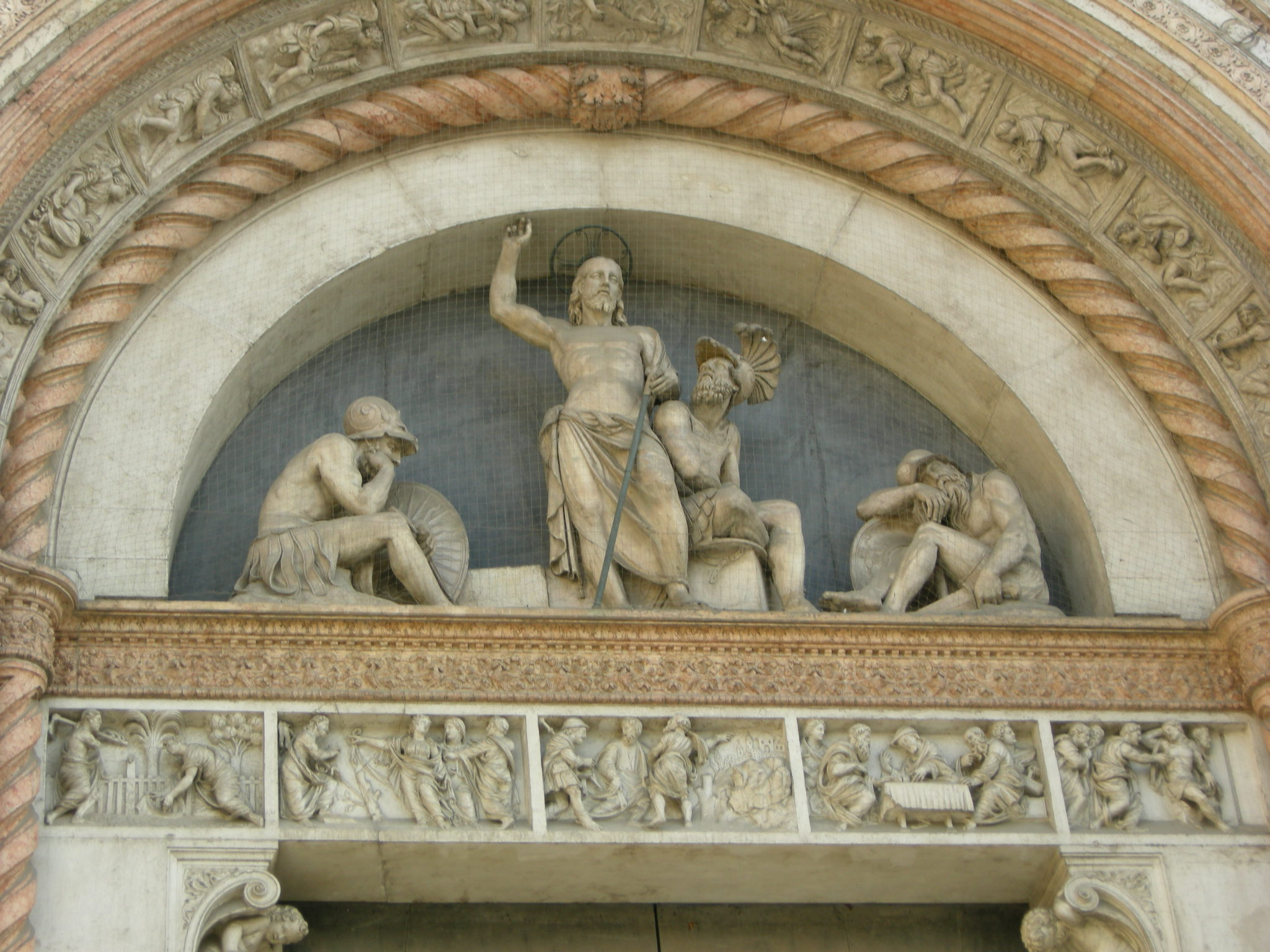
Lunette of the Resurrection, facade of San Petronio Basilica in Bologna

Lombardi also carved sculptures in marble for the facade of San Petronio Basilica in Bologna, including the Lunette of the Resurrection (1527) and the side doors depicting the Annunciation and Adam and Eve (1526–32).

Lombardi’s success in Bologna brought commissions in Faenza and Castel Bolognese. According to Vasari, Lombardi was commissioned and prepared models for Pope Clement VII’s sepulchral monument, but this project was never completed due to the death of Cardinal Ippolito de' Medici, who had promised the work to Lombardi.
