= Palazzo Zambeccari =

Palace in Bologna, Italy

Coordinates: 44°29′20.0″N 11°20′25.03″E

The Palazzo Zambeccari at 11 Via Carbonesi is a Neoclassical urban palace in central Bologna, region of Emilia-Romagna, Italy. It is located diagonal to the facade of San Paolo Maggiore, and in 2015 was home to offices of the Banco Popular di Milano SCRL.

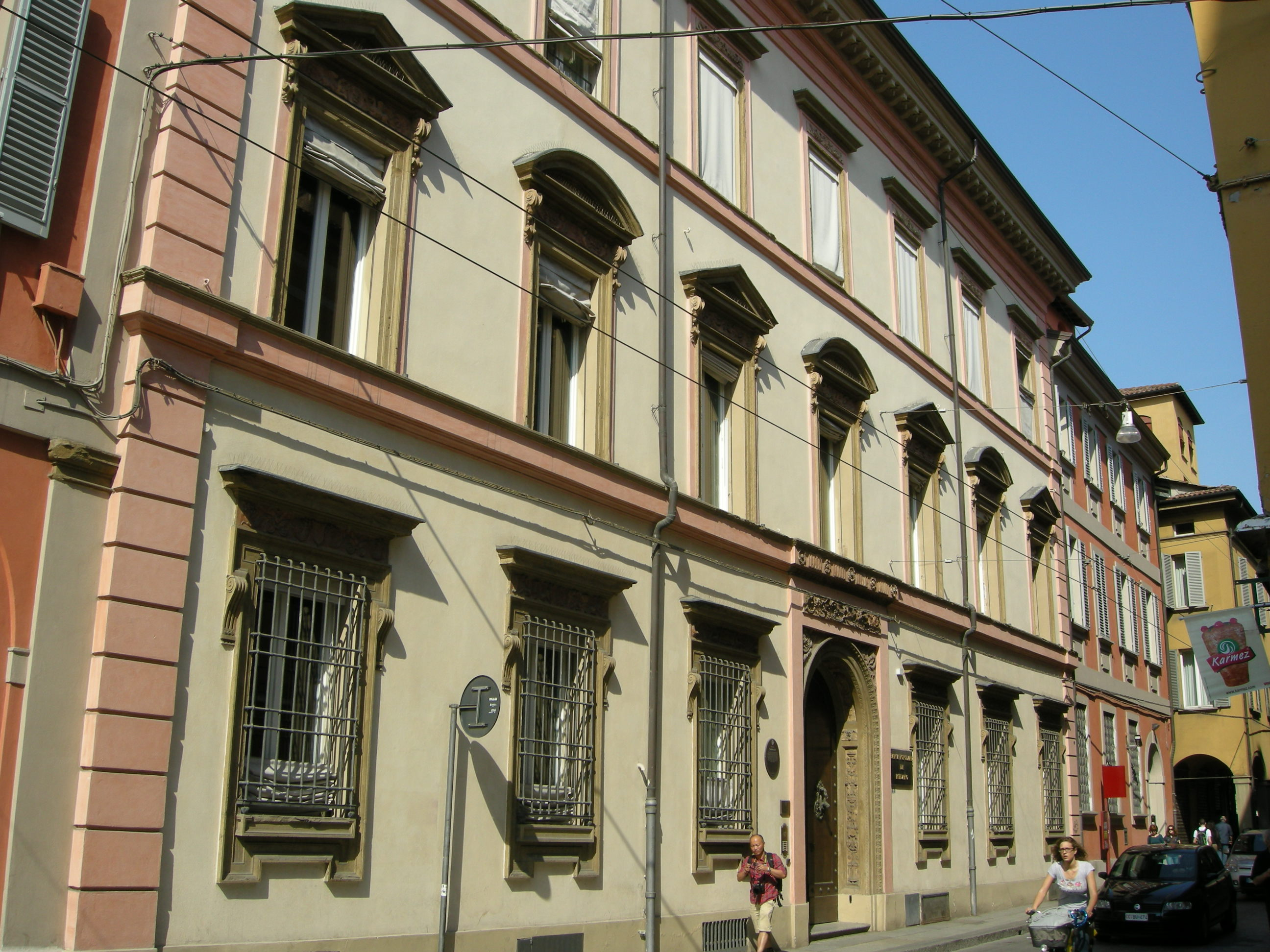
The facade of the Palazzo Zambeccari in May 2011.

== History ==
The palace was designed in 1775 by Carlo Bianconi. The grand staircase has quadratura by Giovanni Santi and Francesco Santini with stucco decoration (1790) by Luigi Acquisti (1790). The piano nobile has a room decorated with a fresco depicting Olympus by Giuseppe Maria Roli and Giacomo Alboresi. The interior courtyard was roofed in glass during a modern refurbishment.
