= Santi Bartolomeo e Gaetano =

Roman Catholic church in Bologna, Italy

Coordinates: 44°29′39″N 11°20′50″E

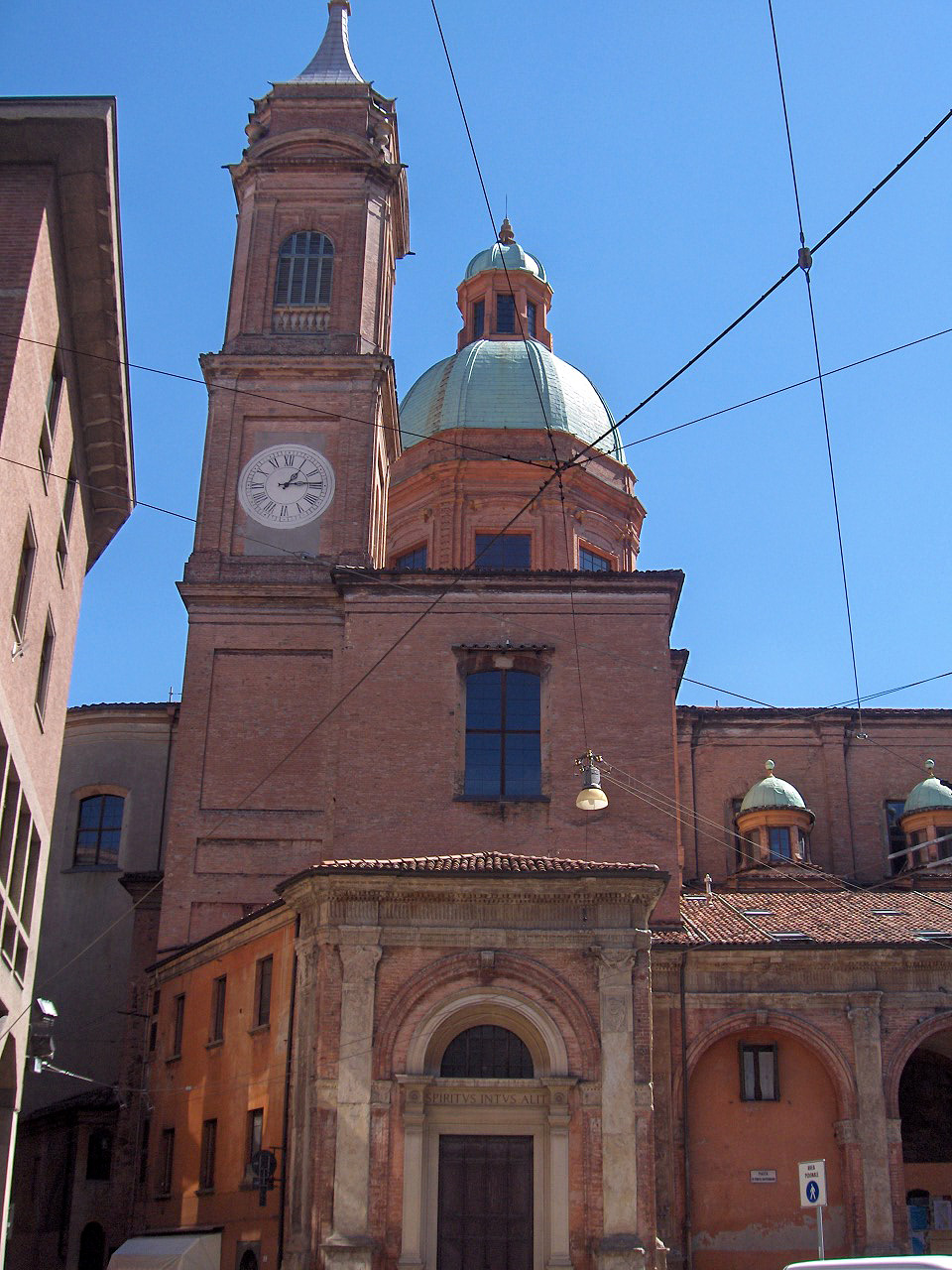

Religion
- Affiliation: Roman Catholic
- Year consecrated: 1516

Location
- Location: Bologna, Emilia-Romagna
- Interactive map of Santi Bartolomeo e Gaetano

Architecture
- Architects: Andrea Marchesi, Giovanni Battista Natali, and Agostino Barelli
- Type: Church
- Style: Renaissance

Santi Bartolomeo e Gaetano is a Renaissance style, Roman Catholic church in central Bologna; it is located near the Two Towers, adjacent to the Strada Maggiore.

== History ==
A church at the site dedicated to St Bartholemew had existed since the 5th century; it was likely built atop an even older church and housed Benedictine monks till the 16th century. The church was designed by Giovanni Battista Falcetti with elaboration by Agostino Barelli, and owes the awkward facade due to its construction in 1517 at the site of a palace begun by Andrea da Formigine, commissioned by a member of the Gozzadini. The project, which is seen in the single-story portico along the exterior, was interrupted after the death of the patron, soon after completion of what became the side portico.

In 1599, the church came under the leadership of the Theatines, and in 1627, they ordained a complete restructuring of the complex by Giovanni Battista Natali, called il Falzetta, and by Agostino Barelli. In 1671 when Cajetan (Gaetano), the founder of the Theatine order, was canonized, the church gained the added dedication. The bell-tower and final chapels were completed by 1694.

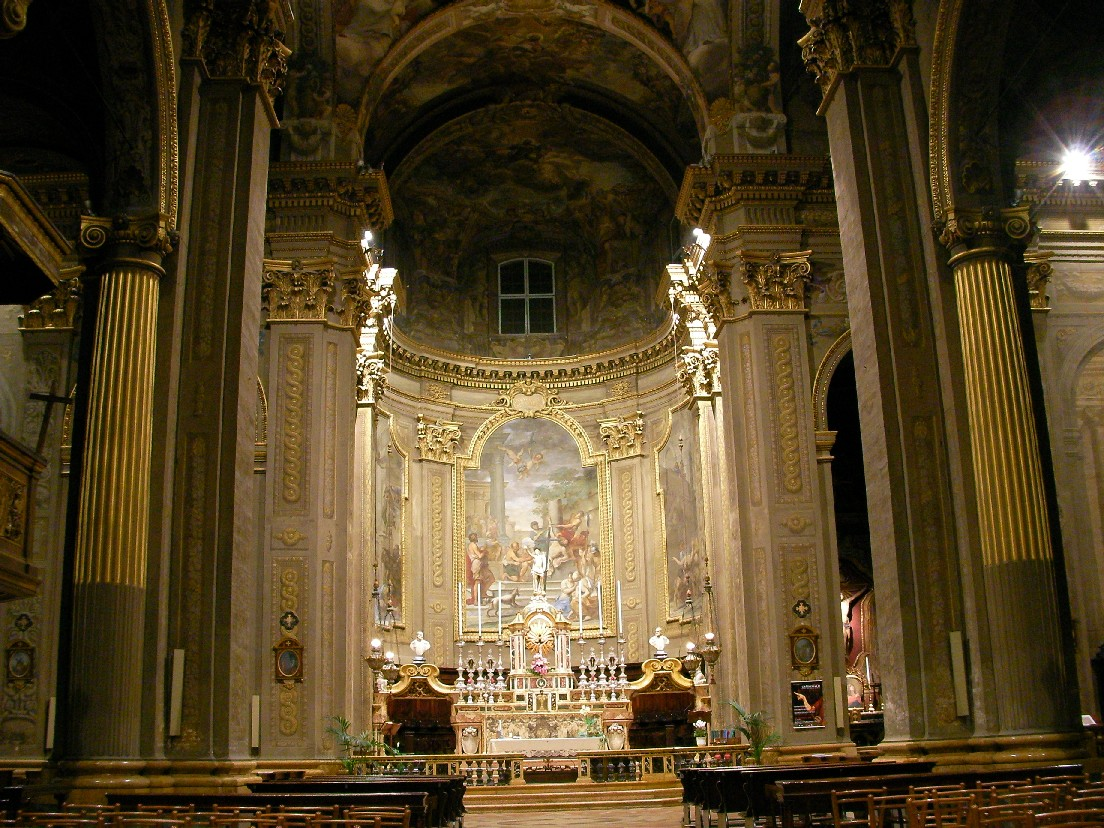
Interior

== Interiors ==
The ceiling of the central nave has a Vision of San Gaetano (1667) by Angelo Michele Colonna and Giacomo Alboresi. The second altar on the right has a San Carlo Borromeo at the cemetery of Varallo (1614) by Ludovico Carracci. The 4th altar on right has an Annunciation (of the Beautiful Angel) (1632) by Francesco Albani and he also painted the lateral wall frescoes (1633) depicting a Nativity and Dream of Joseph. In the ceiling of transept is depicted a Glory of San Stefano (1695) by Giovanni Antonio Burrini and Marcantonio Chiarini. The apse has a depiction of the Martyrdom of San Bartolomeo and Two Miracles of the Saint, 1685 frescoes by Marcantonio Franceschini and Luigi Quaini. The cupola (1691) was decorated by Giuseppe and Antonio Rolli. The chapel of the left transept has a Beato Paolo Buralli (1772) by Ubaldo Gandolfi and a small Madonna with sleeping Jesus (1632) by Guido Reni.

The lunettes of the portico were decorated with scenes from the life of St Cajetan, including one by Lucio Massari. The Baroque interior also has paintings by Alessandro Tiarini, Ercole de Maria, and Carlo Baldi.

== Sources ==
- Parish Website
