= Palazzo Zani =

Building in Bologna, Italy

Coordinates: 44°29′20.0″N 11°21′48.05″E

Palazzo Zani is a Renaissance palace on via Santo Stefano 56 in central Bologna, region of Emilia Romagna, Italy.

== History ==
Construction of the palace was commissioned from Marc’Antonio Zani, from the architect Floriano Ambrosini. The palace was completed in 1594. The facade has a giant order of pilasters, standing atop a rusticated portico. The courtyard had an illusionistic fresco (1785) painted by Antonio Bonetti. The ground floor has frescoes by Girolamo Mattioli, while the ceiling of the main salon was decorated by a young Guido Reni with frescoes of the Fall of Phaeton. The Zani family once owned the Madonna of the Rose by Parmigianino, sold in 1732, and now in the collection at Dresden.

The Reni fresco is surrounded by later embellishments including the Four Elements at the angles by Gaetano Gandolfi, and quadratura by Serafino Barozzi. The stucco work was completed by Giacomo De Maria. The bas-reliefs over the doors, illustring events of the myth of Phaeton were completed in the 19th century by Vincenzo Testoni.

In 1745 The palace was acquired by the Abbot Pier Antonio Odorici, treasurer of Pope Benedict XIV. The palace was restructured by the architects Giuseppe Antonio, Camillo Ambrosi, and later Giuseppe Tubertini. In 1840, the palace was acquired by Prince Pietro Pallavicini, who further refurbished the interiors. The palace is now owned by the Bonifica Renana Foundation.
