= Giacomo Cavedone =

Italian painter (1577–1660)

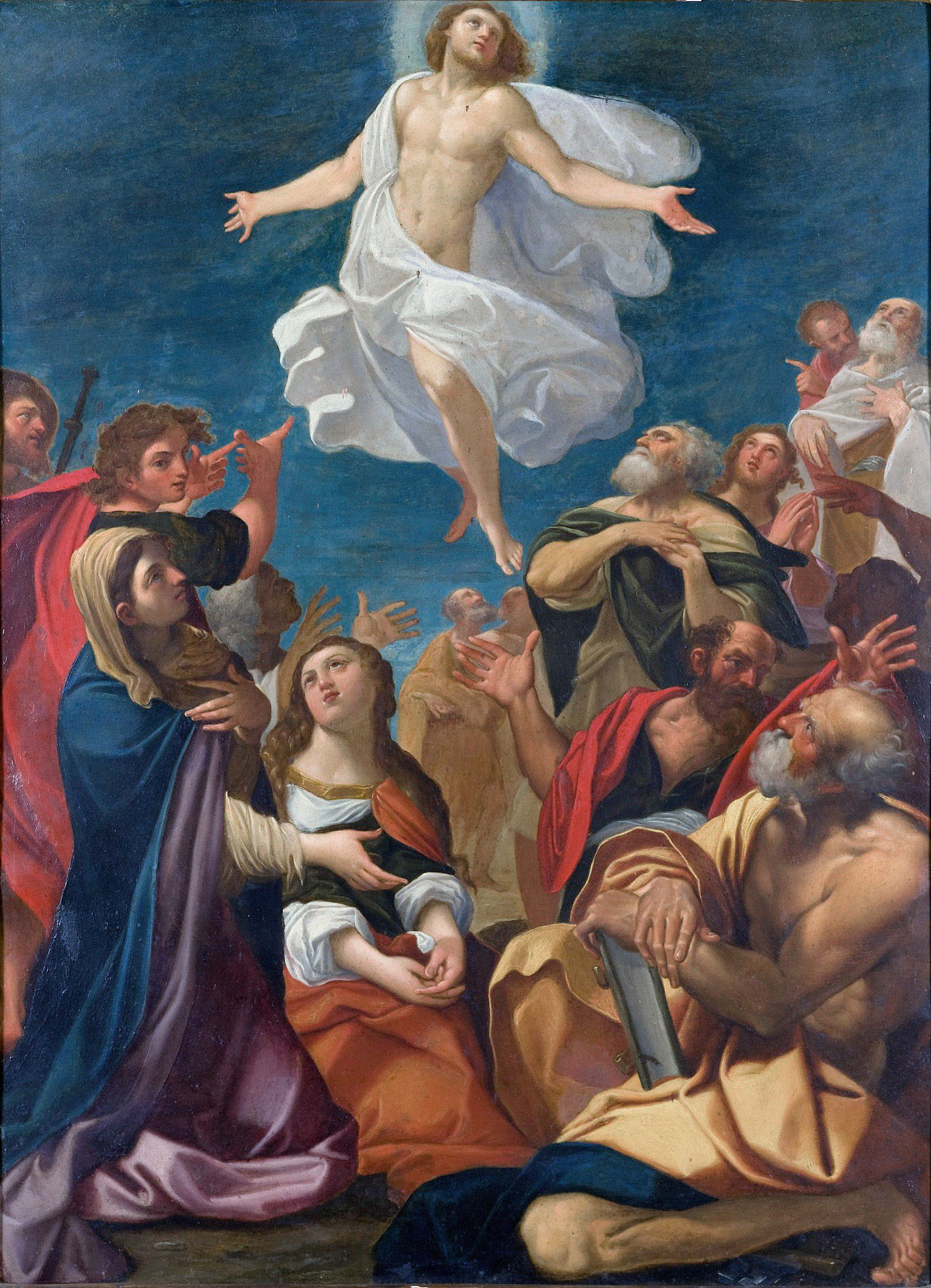
- The Ascention of Christ, c. 1640, Los Angeles County Museum of Art, Los Angeles
- Born: 14 April 1577; Sassuolo, Duchy of Modena and Reggio
- Died: 1660 (aged 82–83); Bologna, Papal States
- Education: Bernardino Baldi and Annibale Carracci
- Known for: Painting
- Movement: Baroque

Giacomo Cavedone (also called Giacomo Cavedoni; 14 April 1577–1660) was an Italian Baroque painter of the Bolognese School. He belonged to the generation of Carracci-inspired or trained painters that included Giovanni Andrea Donducci; Alessandro Tiarini, Lucio Massari, Leonello Spada and Lorenzo Garbieri.

== Life ==
Giacomo Cavedone was born in Sassuolo, near Modena, on 14 April 1577. At the age of 14, he obtained a three-year stipend to apprentice with Bernardino Baldi and Annibale Carracci. In his earliest works, such as the St. Stephen in Glory (1601; Modena, Galleria Estense), he distinguished himself from his fellow students in the Carracci Academy by proposing a more prosaic alternative to Ludovico’s lyrical style. While preserving the latter’s polished and abstract surfaces, he gave his forms a robust quality that derived partly from his early training with Annibale. To these conflicting influences he added his own predilection for severely angular drapery, as well as a tendency to foreshorten his figures in an abrupt manner that was aptly termed abbreviatura by Malvasia. Between 1601 and 1609 Cavedone put this method to dramatic effect in such works as the Temptation of St. Anthony (1607; San Benedetto, Bologna), which is based on a reproductive engraving by Agostino Carracci after Tintoretto.

This indirect reference to Venetian painting indicates that, contrary to what has been thus far conjectured in the literature, his brief but significant trip to Venice probably occurred in 1612–13 after, not before, his documented stay in Rome. He went to the latter city in 1609 to work as Guido Reni’s assistant. Between his visit to Rome and 1614 Cavedone’s style changed considerably, first becoming more monumental and classical, as in the three-quarter-length Baptism (c. 1611–12; Modena, San Pietro Martire) and the slightly later Capture of Samson (c. 1612–13; London, priv. col.), in which the dense and dramatic chiaroscuro reveals the impact of Caravaggio.

Virgin and Child in Glory with Saints Petronio and Alo, 1614, Pinacoteca Nazionale di Bologna

During this brief, yet prolific period Cavedone also executed his most influential works: the lateral paintings of the Adoration of the Magi and the Adoration of the Shepherds (1613–14) for the Arrigoni Chapel in San Paolo Maggiore, Bologna, where he also painted three vault frescoes – the Circumcision, Christ among the Doctors and the Flight into Egypt, and the Virgin and Child Adored by St. Alo and St. Petronius (1614; Pinacoteca Nazionale di Bologna). These simple and forceful compositions, in which naturalistic details and abstract surfaces are held in balance, are enhanced by a rich Titianesque coloring that was unusual at the time in Bologna and that made a strong impression on the young Guercino. Their broad displays of warm and luminous colour, sumptuous costumes and palpable atmospheric quality were undoubtedly inspired by Venetian art.

In Cavedone’s work from 1614–24 a distinctive crystalline quality emerged, with a consequent reduction in atmospheric effects and textural differentiation. He made these changes as part of a constructive response to the idealized style of Guido Reni, who quickly became the pre-eminent painter in Bologna after his return there in 1614. Such a response is visible in the altarpiece of Christ Appearing to the Blessed John of Sahagun (c. 1618–20; San Giacomo Maggiore, Bologna), in which Cavedone detached his figures emphatically from the background by using a sharp creasing light that evokes the hallucinatory quality of Sahagun’s vision. In 1618, Cavedone became a member of the Council of Bologna's Painters' Guild, and upon the death of Ludovico Carracci in 1619, he became Caposindaco of the Accademia degli Incamminati. In 1623, while painting a fresco of the Four Doctors of the Church in Santissimo Salvatore, Bologna, he fell from the scaffolding. This was the start of a series of misfortunes that marred his career.

In Cavedone’s final productive period (c. 1623–8) he attempted to emulate Reni’s graceful drapery, calm lighting and smooth, idealized faces, as is demonstrated in the Baptism (c. 1623–5; San Paolo Maggiore, Bologna). The resulting soft and generalized effect looks artificial and is indicative of a decline, as is the somewhat summary technique, which becomes more noticeable in his last securely dated work, the Adoration of the Shepherds (1628; Madrid, Museo del Prado). His wife and children died in the plague of 1630. He lived on, but with little will to paint, and died in poverty in 1660. Among his pupils were Giovanni Andrea Sirani, Giovanni Battista Cavazza and Flaminio Torre.

Head of a Bearded Man, Metropolitan Museum of Art, New York

Cavedone’s consistently forceful preparatory drawings (mostly in black chalk) and oil sketches have often been misattributed to various artists, including Titian and the Carracci. They are characterized by a brusque and angular line and broad, parallel shading (e.g. St. John of Sahagun Kneeling, a study for the altarpiece in San Giacomo Maggiore, 1618; Windsor Castle, Berkshire, Royal Library), which acquired a striking luminosity after his visit to Venice (e.g. the drawing for the Capture of Samson and the oil sketch for the Adoration of the Shepherds (both Paris, Louvre)).

His figure studies emphasize complex and voluminous drapery, which in the later drawings tends to dominate the underlying human form. Particularly compelling are his numerous studies of heads, which are indebted to the more finished secular portrait drawings by Annibale and Agostino Carracci. Conceived abstractly in terms of broad planes and abrupt accents, the rugged and yet vulnerable faces possess an expressive directness that is the prominent feature of Cavedone’s style. There are many examples of these, as of other drawings by him, in the Royal Library at Windsor Castle.

== Partial anthology ==
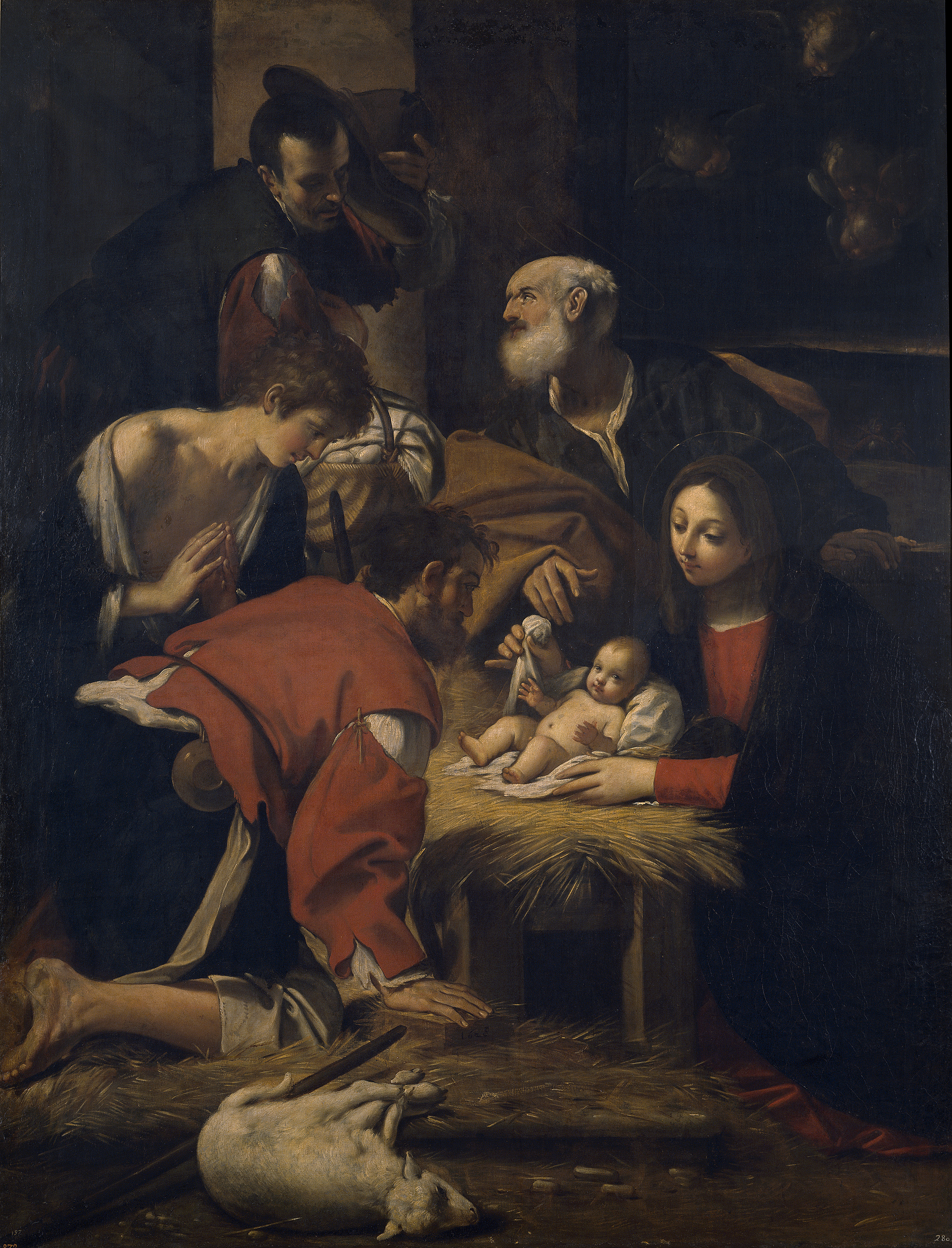
Adoration of the Shepherds, Museo del Prado, Madrid

- St. Stephen in Glory (1601, Galleria Estense, Modena);
- Deposition (Santa Maria del Fonte, Caravaggio);
- Death of St. Peter Martyr (Pinacoteca Nazionale, Bologna);
- Baptism of Christ (1611–12, San Pietro Martire, Modena);
- Virgin and Child with St. Petronio and St. Alo (1614, Pinacoteca Nazionale, Bologna);
- Discovery of the Miraculous Crucifix of Beirut (1622, San Salvatore, Bologna);
- Adoration of the Shepherds and Adoration of the Magi (San Paolo Maggiore, Bologna);
- Adoration of the Shepherds, Museo del Prado, Madrid;
- Seated Warrior Holding a Sword and Shield (drawing, c. 1612, National Gallery of Art);
- The Adoration of the Shepherds (New College, Oxford);
- St. Gregory (Chiswick House, London);
- Sketch for The Last Supper; verso: The Conversion of St. Paul, Fogg Art Museum);
- The Miracle of the Loaves and Fishes (drawing, 1611–1614, Fitzwilliam Museum, Cambridge);
- Judith and Holofernes (Banca Popolare dell'Emilia Romagna, Modena);
- Allegory of Painting (Palazzo Pitti, Florence).
Allegory of Painting, Palazzo Pitti, Florence

The Adoration of the Shepherds, New College, Oxford

St. Gregory, Chiswick House, London

The Mocking of Christ, c. 1615, priv. col.

== Bibliography ==
- Malvasia, Carlo Cesare (1841) [1678]. Giampietro Zanotti (ed.). Felsina Pittrice. Vol. II. Bologna: Guidi all'Ancora. pp. 143–48.
- Chisholm, Hugh, ed. (1911). "Cavedone, Jacopo" . Encyclopædia Britannica (11th ed.). Cambridge University Press.
- Novelli, Maria Angela (1979). "CAVEDONI, Giacomo". Dizionario Biografico degli Italiani (in Italian). Vol. 23: Cavallucci–Cerretesi. Rome: Institute of the Italian Encyclopaedia. ISBN 978-88-12-00032-6.

== Further readings ==
- The Age of Correggio and the Carracci: Emilian painting of the sixteenth and seventeenth centuries. Washington, D.C.: National Gallery of Art. 1986. ISBN 978-0521340199.
- Wittkower, Rudolf (1993). Art and Architecture Italy, 1600-1750. Pelican History of Art. Penguin Books. pp. 92–94.
