= Carlo Garbieri =

Carlo Garbieri may refer to:

- Carlo Garbieri (painter)
- Carlo Garbieri (army officer)
