= Giuseppe Antonio Caccioli =

Italian painter

Giuseppe Antonio Caccioli (October 18, 1672 – July 20, 1740) was an Italian painter of the Baroque period.

== Biography ==
Giuseppe Antonio Caccioli was born in Bologna, Papal States. When he was three, his father the painter Giovanni Battista Caccioli died, and from a very early age he was taught to paint by his tutors. He later apprenticed with the brothers Giuseppe and Antonio Rolli who at the time were painting the ceiling of San Paolo Maggiore church in Bologna. Caccioli had a natural predisposition for the art of painting.

He married Rosa Teresa Fontana with whom he had two boys. He died in Bologna at the age of 67 and was buried in Santa Maria Maggiore in Bologna.

== Works ==
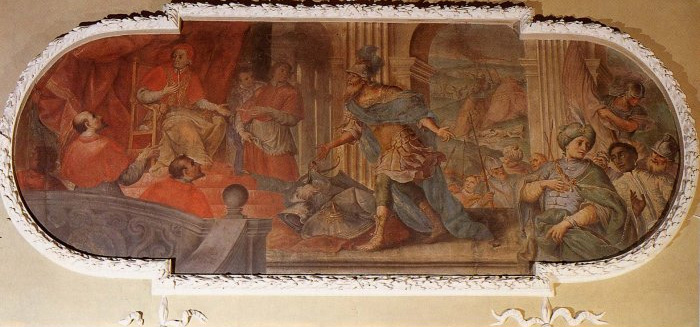
Painting by Caccioli representing Mario Scoto and Pope Leo III

He painted Mario Scoto bringing back Pope Leo III to his Holy See in Rome and Galeazzo e Taddeo Marescotti freeing Annibale Bentivogli from the Rocca di Varano. Both can still be seen at Palazzo Marescotti Brazzetti in Bologna.

He painted the portrait of Cardinal Raniero elevated by Pope Lucius II.

After three years spent at the service of Prince Louis of Baden in Germany together with Pietro Francesco Farina, he returned to Bologna where he painted the facade of the Foro della Mercanzia, a chapel dell'arte de'falegnami, a chapel dell'arte de'notai and the facade over the altar of San Gabriello church.

After the death of Antonio Roli in 1695, he was chosen to paint the church of San Paolo. At first he depicted the four parts of the world in four corners, then he continued to paint the whole cupola, the choir and finally the two large lateral chapels. He then painted all the ovals in the sacristy with Life of St Joseph and on the outside a fresco of The Holy Family. He then painted the church of the orphans of San Bartolomeo di Reno with the Virgin of the Rain.

In Trento, he painted two naves of the Duomo of Trento, and upon his return to Bologna, using tempera the nave above the door of the Collegio del Ritiro delle Dame.

In 1713 he went to Florence where in the palace of the Senator Tempi he painted the ball room and various rooms. Back in Bologna on May 20, 1714, he painted all the ovals in the sacristy and the hall of the church of San Francesco. In 1721 he went to Asti to paint the church of San Martino.

He then returned to Bologna where he stayed. Amongst his various works, he painted the rooms of the house of Giovagnoni, the oratory of the confraternity della Purità, a chapel of San Petronio, the altar in the church of Santi Stefano e Maurizi and a door of the oratory of the confraternity della Carità.
