= Aldrovandini =

Aldrovandini is an Italian surname. Notable people with the surname include:

- Giuseppe Aldrovandini (1671–1707), Italian Baroque composer
- Mauro Aldrovandini (1649–1680), Italian painter of the Baroque period
- Pompeo Aldrovandini (1677–1735), Italian painter of the Baroque period, son of Mauro
- Tommaso Aldrovandini (1677–1735), Italian painter of the Baroque period, nephew of Mauro
