= Santa Maria della Neve, Bologna =

Church building in Bologna, Italy

Santa Maria della Neve is a now-deconsecrated, former Roman-Catholic church, located in Vicolo della Neve #5 in Bologna, region of Emilia Romagna, Italy.

== History ==
A church at the site was first erected in 1479 to house a Marian image painted on the outer walls of the city at that time. Initially, the church was called Madonna dell'Orto. The present structure was built in 1661 and renamed by the Roman Confraternity of the Gonfalone. The confraternity was involved in the ransoming of Christians in Saracen hands. Between 1632 and 1785, twenty Bolognese were liberated by this group. Their names and the chains putatively used during their imprisonment were moved to the church of San Girolamo della Certosa.

In 1796–1808, the Napoleonic forces expropriated the property. Most of the movable artworks were moved to Casa del Clero in the monastery of Sant'Agostino. The upper story still contains an oratory with stuccos. and an altar was decorated by Paolo Reggiani with mural decorations by the Antonio Rolli and his brother Giuseppe, and Giovanni Battista Caccioli.
