= Carlo Garbieri (painter) =

Italian painter

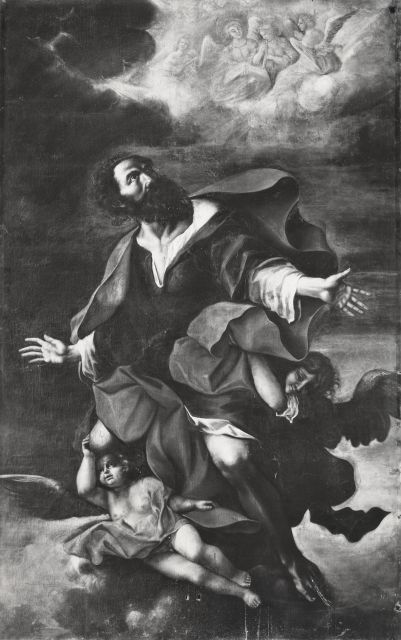
Black-and-white reproduction of St. Paul taken up into Heaven. in the San Paolo Maggiore, Bologna

Carlo Garbieri was an Italian painter of the early Baroque period. He is the son and scholar of Lorenzo Garbieri, painted historical subjects in the style of his father. In the church of San Giovanni in Monte, at Bologna, is a picture by him of the Death of St Mary of Egypt; and in the church of San Paolo is a canvas depicting Glory of St Paul.
