= Floriano Ambrosini =

Italian architect and engineer

Floriano Ambrosini (1557–1621) was an Italian architect and engineer, active in late-Renaissance or Mannerist style, mainly in his native Bologna.

He helped design the Palazzo Magnani and the chapel of St Dominic, containing the Arca di San Domenico, in the church of San Domenico, Bologna. He also designed the Palazzo Zani and the church of San Pietro Martire, Bologna. He also created the Oratorio dei Battuti adjacent to Sanctuary of Santa Maria della Vita, Bologna.

Ambrosini was also a hydraulic engineer, creating locks for the Canale Navile. He wrote a book about the canals of Bologna, and on architecture. Among his disciples was Bonifazio Socchi.
