= Nosadella =

Italian painter

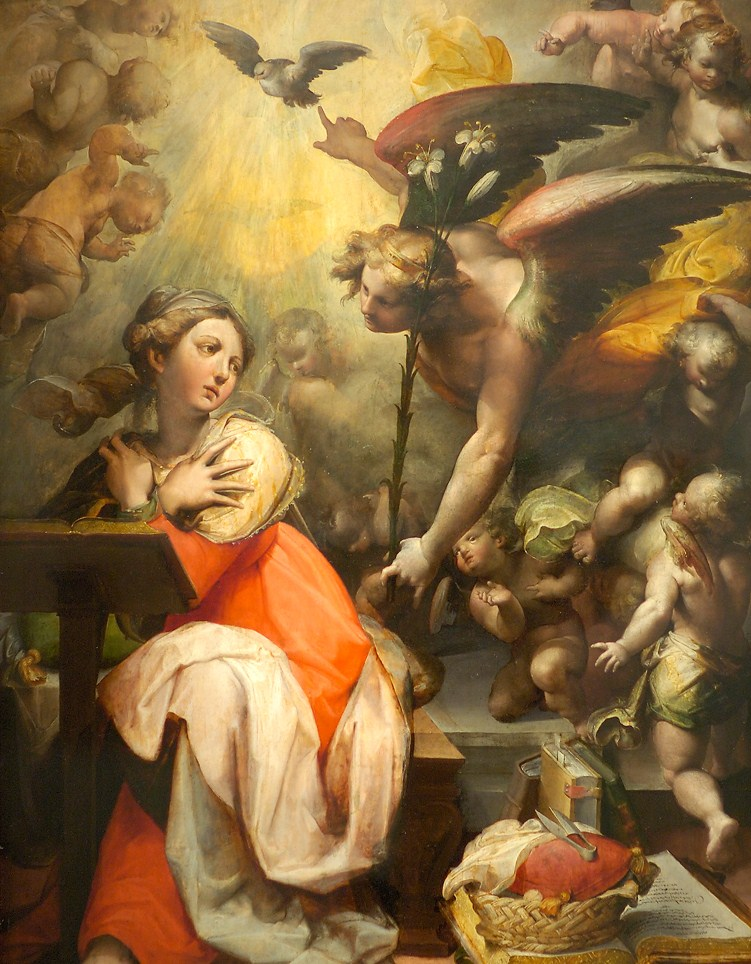
- The Annunciation, 1560s, Princeton University Art Museum
- Born: Giovanni Francesco Bezzi
- Died: 1571
- Known for: Painting, drafting
- Movement: Mannerism

Nosadella, full name Giovanni Francesco Bezzi, (active c. 1549–1571) was an Italian painter and draftsman, active during the Mannerist period, mainly in Bologna. He appears to have traveled to Rome.

He was a pupil of Pellegrino Tibaldi. Few of his paintings have certain attribution; among them are a Madonna and Child with Saints, painted for the Sanctuary of Santa Maria della Vita in Bologna; and a Circumcision (1571), painted for the Church of Santa Maria Maggiore and completed by Prospero Fontana.
