= Agostino Barelli =

Italian architect

Agostino Barelli (Baptized 26 October 1627, Bologna – c. 29 January 1697, Bologna) was an Italian architect of the Baroque.

== Biography ==
Barelli designed portions of the Santi Bartolomeo e Gaetano in Bologna.

Barelli is noted for introducing Italian Baroque architecture to Bavaria. He was invited to Munich by Henriette Adelaide of Savoy to construct the Theatinerkirche in 1664. The work was marked by conflicts with the construction supervisor Spinelli. Barelli created also the draft for Nymphenburg Palace in 1664. He was replaced by Enrico Zuccalli in 1674 and returned to Bologna.

== Chief works ==
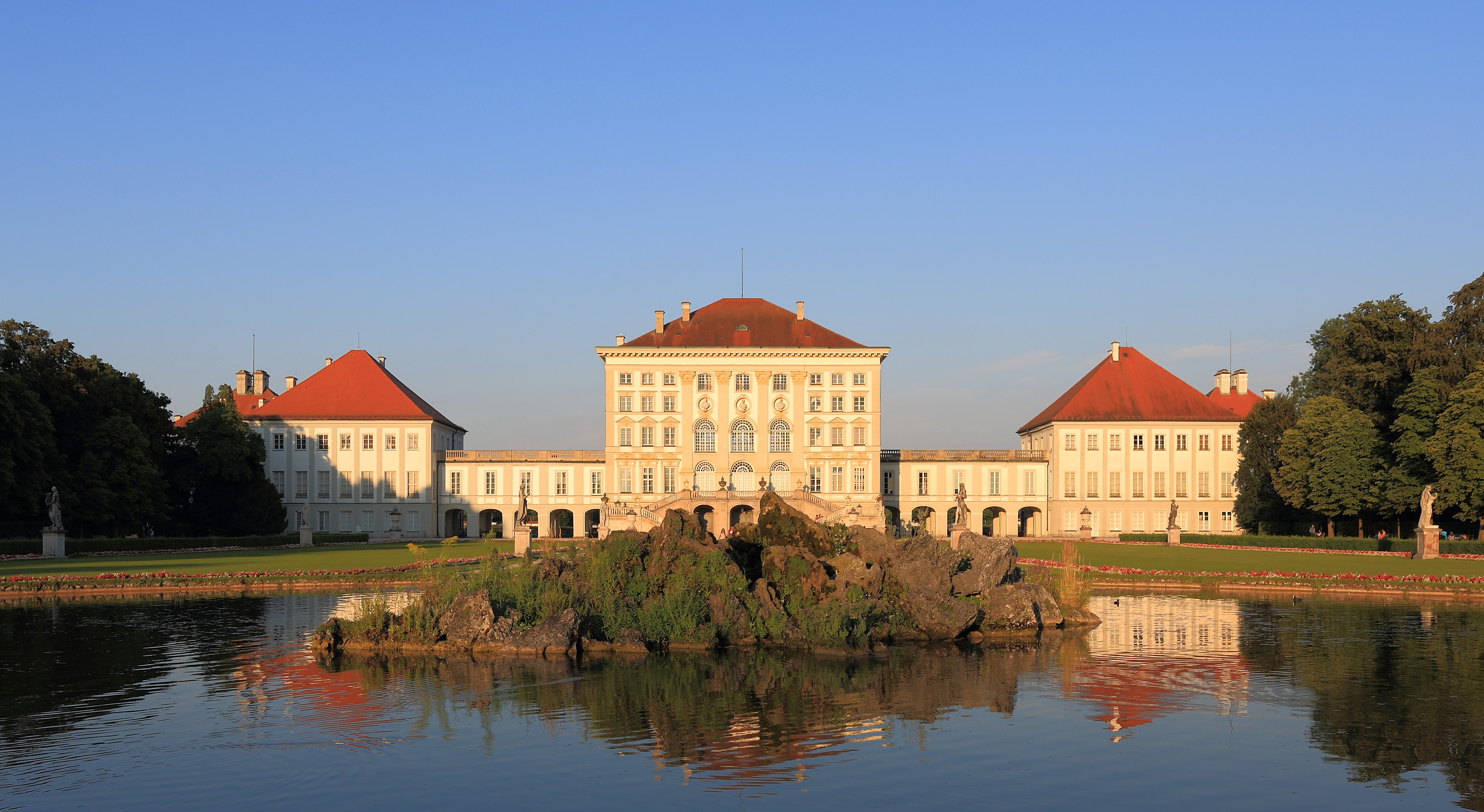
Nymphenburg Palace

- San Bartolomeo Theatine Church, Bologna (1653)
- Theatinerkirche (Munich) (1664-1674)
- Nymphenburg Palace (1664-1674)
- Papal Rooms of the Munich Residence (1666 a.C)
