= Giovanni Battista Cavazza =

Italian painter and engraver

Giovanni Battista Cavazza was an Italian painter and engraver, who was born at Bologna about the year 1620. He studied under Cavedone and Guido, and painted some pictures for public buildings at Bologna. The church of the Nunziata has frescoes of saints painted by him. He engraved the following plates from his own designs:

- The Crucifixion.
- The Resurrection.
- The Death of St. Joseph.
- The Assumption of the Virgin.
