= Santa Maria della Vita =

Church building in Bologna, Italy

Coordinates: 44.493398°N 11.344617°E

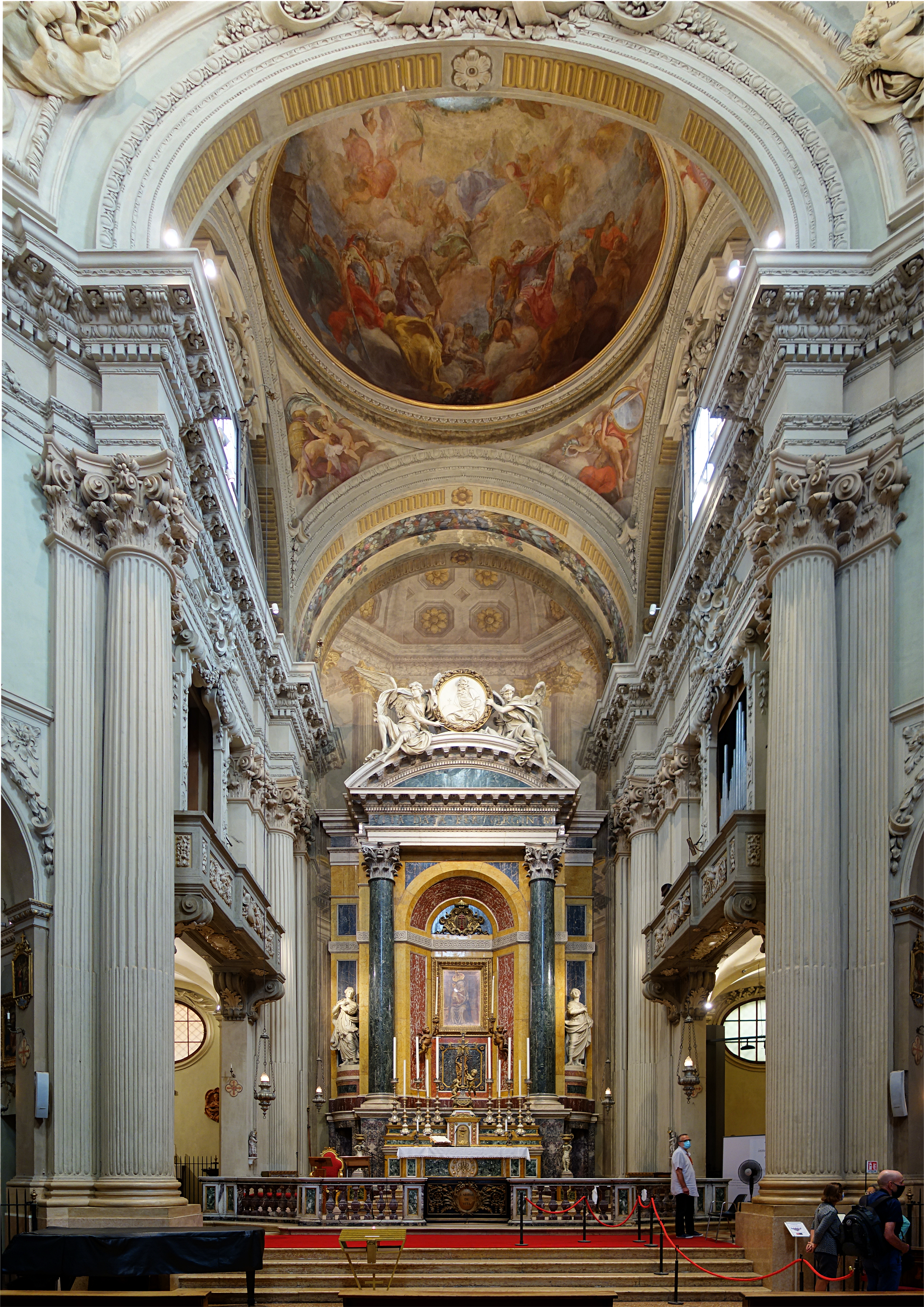
Interior

The Sanctuary of Santa Maria della Vita is a late-Baroque-style, Roman Catholic church in central Bologna, near the Piazza Maggiore.

== History ==
The construction of the present Baroque church began in 1687–1690 under the designs of Giovanni Battista Bergonzoni, who built the elliptical plan with a dome designed by Giuseppe Tubertini, completed in 1787. The facade was not added till 1905. The sanctuary houses the sculptural group of Sorrow over Dead Christ (1463) by Niccolò dell'Arca.

== Oratorio dei Battuti ==
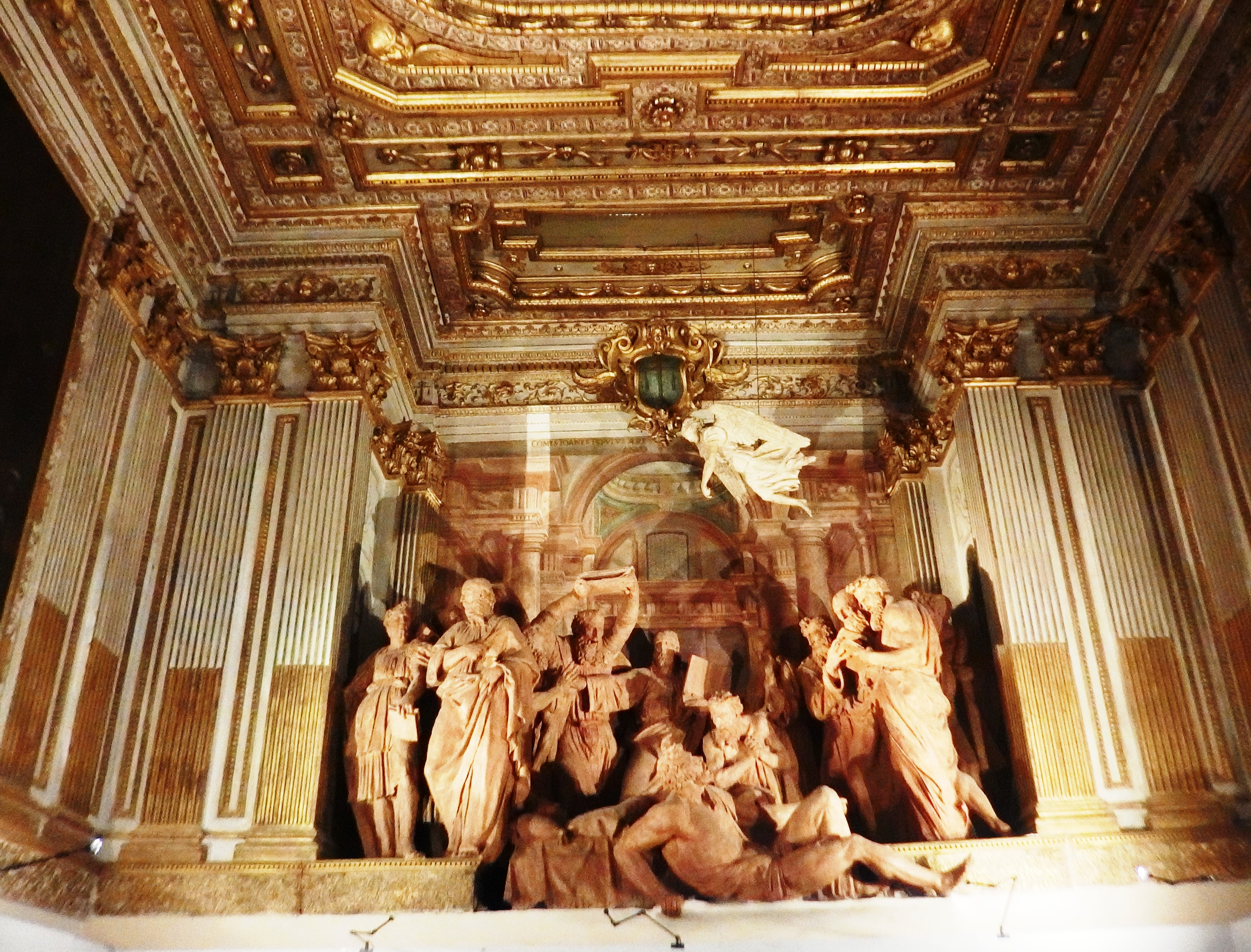
Transit of the Virgin

In the adjacent oratory, built between 1604 and 1617 to designs by Floriano Ambrosini, is a Madonna with child and Saints (1550) by Nosadella and a Transit of the Madonna (bodily assumption), a group of 14 statues in terracotta (1522) by Alfonso Lombardi. On the niches of the walls are statues of St Proculus and St Petronius by the famed sculptor Alessandro Algardi, as well as by Giulio Cesare Conventi (St Francis and St Domenic). In 1275, the local Confraternita dei Battuti Bianchi, a confraternity of flagellants was organized and supported a hospital at the site.
