= Pisogne =

Settlement in Lombardy, Italy

Pisogne Pidhógne
- Comune
- Comune di Pisogne
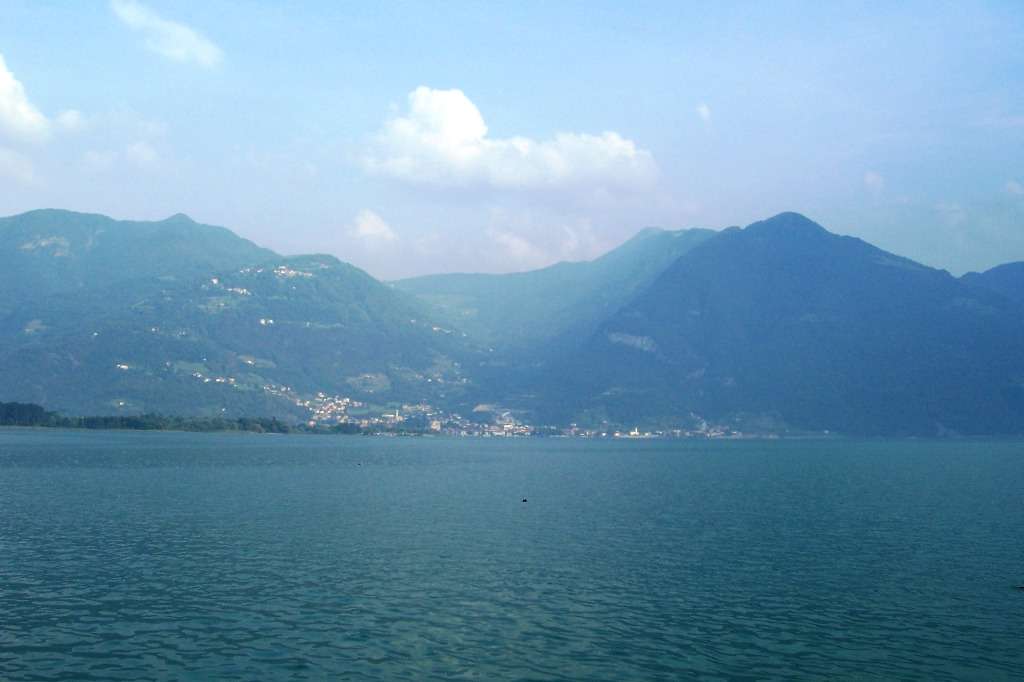

- Coat of arms

- Location within Italy Location within Lombardy
- Coordinates: 45°48′39″N 10°6′29″E
- Country: Italy
- Region: Lombardy
- Province: Province of Brescia (BS)
- Frazioni: Fraine, Govine, Gratacasolo, Grignaghe, Pontasio, Siniga, Sonvico, Toline

Government
  - Mayor: Federico Laini (Centre/Centre-Left)

Area
  - Total: 47 km^{2} (18 sq mi)
- Elevation: 187 m (614 ft)

Population (2011)
  - Total: 8,156
  - Density: 170/km^{2} (450/sq mi)
- Demonym: Pisognesi
- Time zone: UTC+1 (CET)
  - Summer (DST): UTC+2 (CEST)
- Postal code: 25055
- Dialing code: 0364
- Patron saint: San Costanzo
- Saint day: 12 May
- Website: Official website

Pisogne (Camunian: Pidhógne) is a comune of 8156 inhabitants in the province of Brescia, in Lombardy, Italy. It is located about 30 kilometers (19 mi) northwest of Brescia, 51 kilometers (32 miles) northeast of Bergamo, and 97 kilometers (60 miles) northeast of Milan.

Today, Pisogne is a tourist destination, known for its historic center, its lakeside location, and its proximity to the Val Camonica. The town is home to a number of historical landmarks, including the Church of Santa Maria Assunta, the Torre del Vescovo (Bishop's Tower), and the Roman Bridge. Pisogne is also a starting point for hiking and biking trails in the Val Camonica. The town is home to a number of frescoes dating from the 14th to the 16th centuries. The town's annual festival, the Festa del Perdono, is held in July. Pisogne is also a destination for windsurfing and kitesurfing.

== Geography ==
Pisogne is situated at the northern-east tip of Lake Iseo, where the river Oglio flows into the lake. It is the lowermost commune of the Val Camonica. Neighbouring communes are Marone, Pezzaze, Pian Camuno, Lovere, and Costa Volpino.

The terrain around Pisogne is varied, with hills, mountains, and valleys. The climate in Pisogne is temperate, with warm summers and cool winters. The average temperature in July is 24 degrees Celsius (75 degrees Fahrenheit), and the average temperature in January is 2 degrees Celsius (36 degrees Fahrenheit). The main river in Pisogne is the Oglio, which flows through the town and into Lake Iseo. The Oglio is a major river in Italy, and it is a destination for whitewater rafting and kayaking. The mountains surrounding Pisogne are part of the Alps.

== History ==
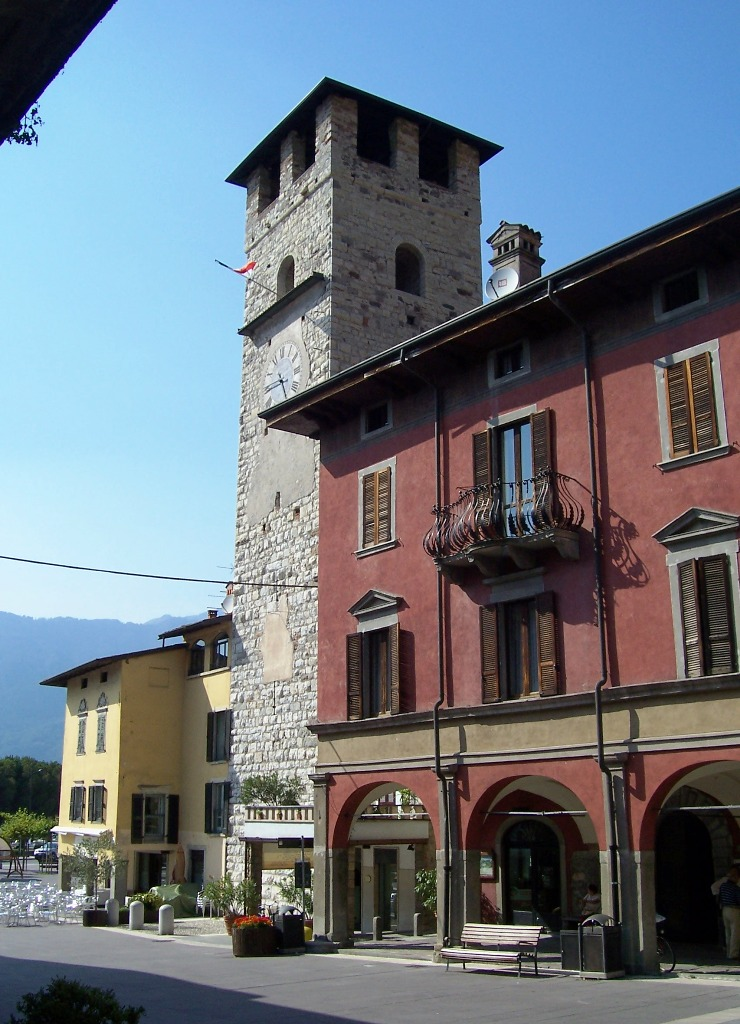
Tower of Bishop

Pisogne is mentioned for the first time in 1227.

In 1287 the great rebellion led by Camunian Federici noble family against the city of Brescia, was followed by the killing of several of Pisogne Guelphs resident there. Following this fact, the town was fortified between the 12th and 13th century and granted to the Brusati family.

In the XVI century, Pisogne became famous for the many executions by burning of those considered heretics and witches. During this time, 60 women were burned alive between Pisogne and Edolo after being tortured and tried at the Inquisition Court based in Cemmo. On 18th of July 1518, eight women died. Only several years later the Papal Legate from Venice investigate the events, leading to the dissolution of the Cemmo Court and the return of the confiscated property to the families of the victims.

On November 14, 1727, the bandit Giorgio Vicario, one of the most feared of Val Camonica "buli" (bandits), born in Pisogne in 1695, was murdered. Vicario's death was a major event in the town, and it is still remembered today.

In 1907, Pisogne was reached by the Brescia-Iseo-Edolo railway line, which is still running.

In the modern era, Pisogne has become a tourist destination, and in recent years has seen a growing expat community.

== Transport ==
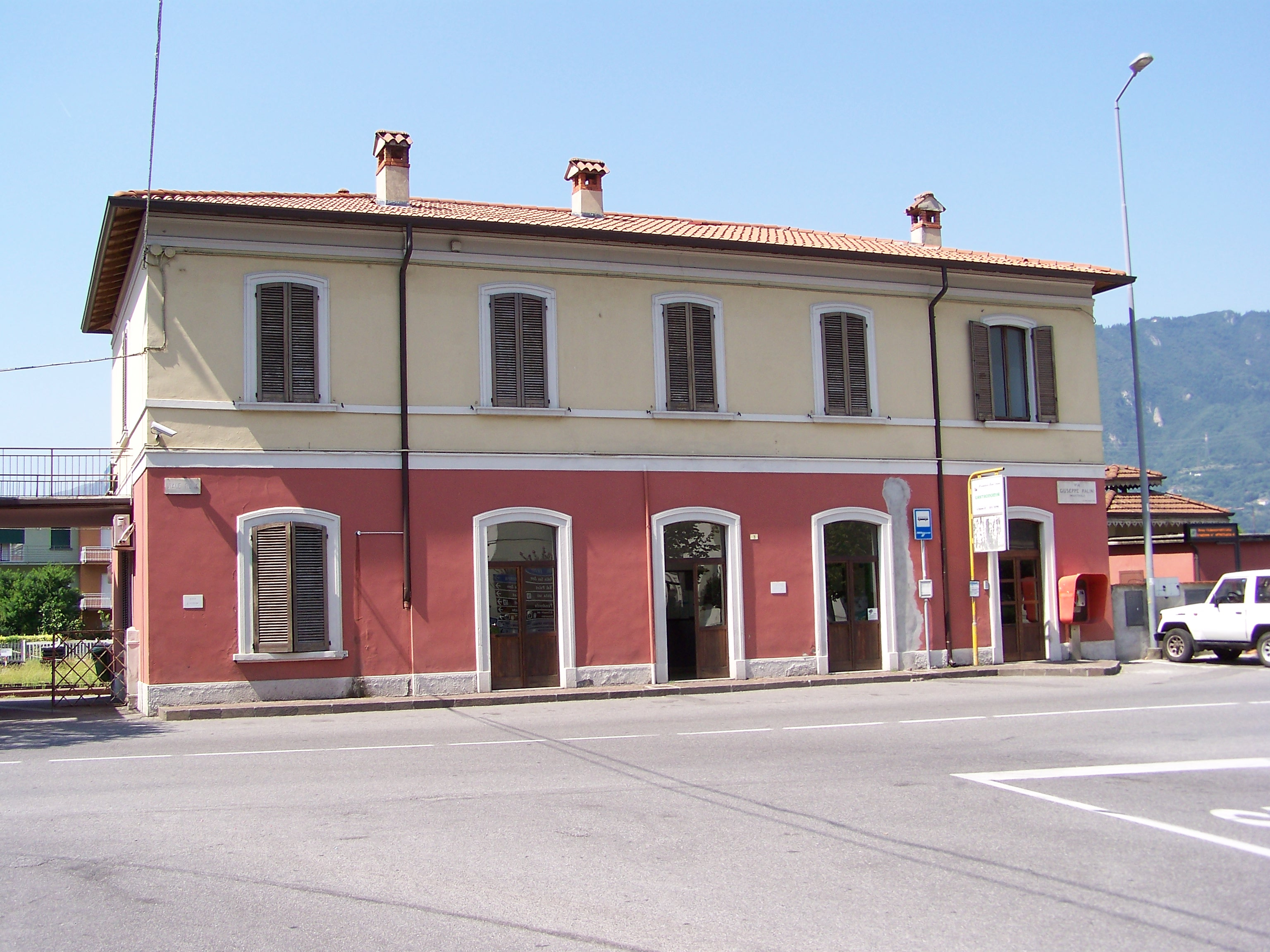
The Pisogne station in 2009.

Pisogne is served by the Brescia–Iseo–Edolo railway (BS-IE), a regional railway line that connects the city of Brescia with the town of Edolo in the Val Camonica. The train track to Pisogne is single-track and non-electrified. There are two train stations in Pisogne: Pisogne and Toline. The Pisogne station is located in the town center, while the Toline station is located on the southern outskirts of town. Trains to Pisogne depart from the Brescia railway station every 30 minutes to 1 hour. Tickets can be purchased online or on the train with one of the conductors.

== Main sights ==
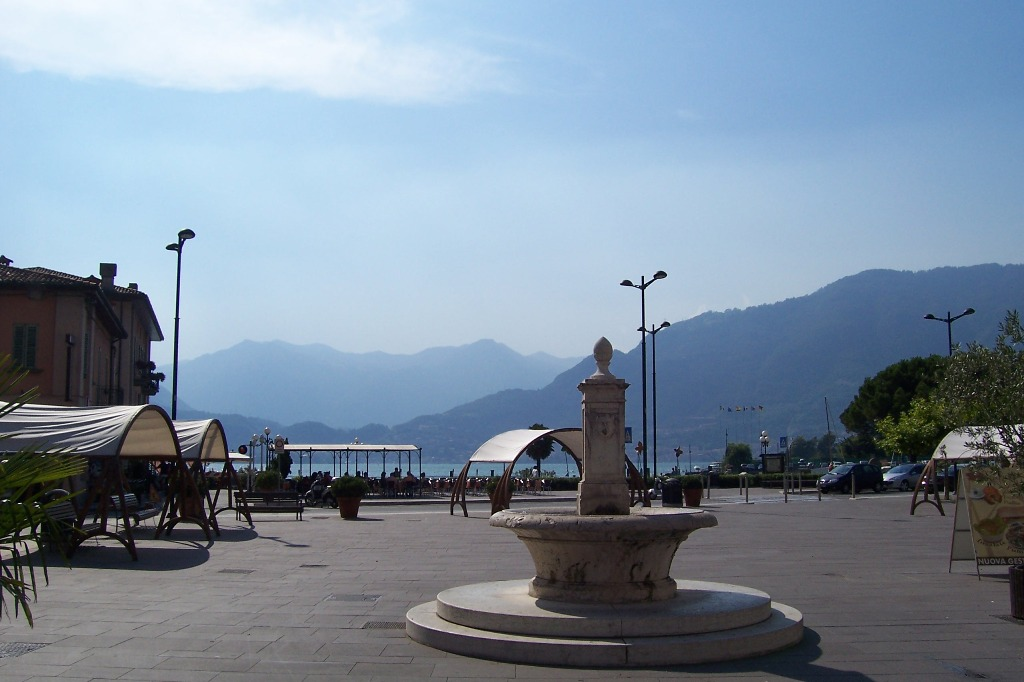
Central square in Pisogne

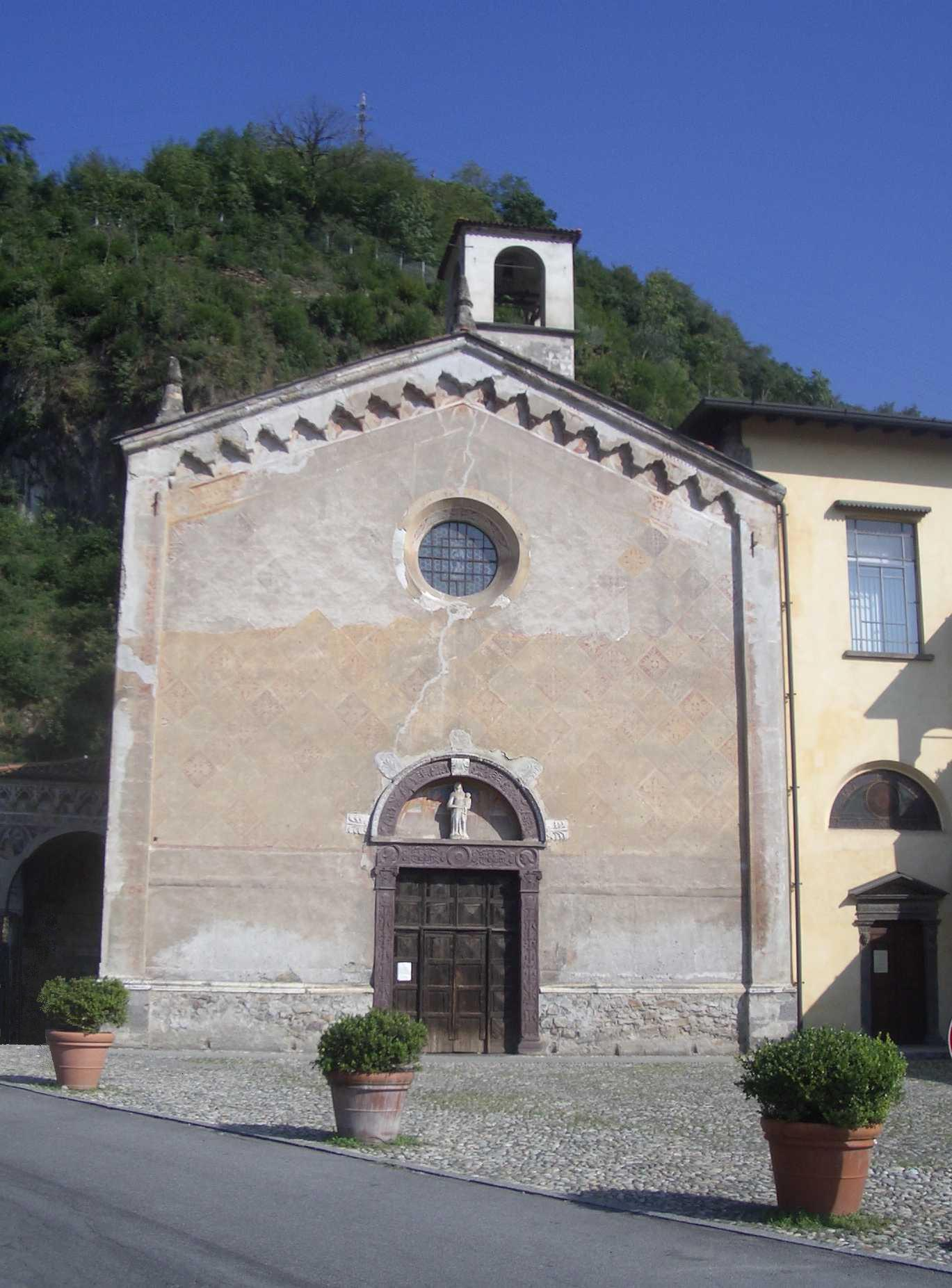
Church of Santa Maria della neve.

- The Church of Santa Maria della Neve, containing frescoes by Romanino
- The ancient parish church of Santa Maria in Silvis, built around the 9th century on ancient Roman remains, still partly visible.
- The parish church dedicated to Santa Maria Assunta, dating to the 18th century.
- The Bishop's Tower, located in the main square (12th century)

== People ==
- Bishop Giacomo Maria Corna Pellegrini
- Giuseppe Romele (* 1992), Paralympic ski skating runner

== International relations ==
=== Twin towns – Sister cities ===
Pisogne is twinned with:

- Konstancin-Jeziorna, Poland (since 1991)

== Sources ==
- Panazza, Gaetano; Araldo Bertolini (1984). Arte in Val Camonica - vol 3 (in Italian). Brescia: Industrie grafiche bresciane.
