= Giovanni Andrea Sirani =

Italian painter (1610–1670)

- Sibylla, Kunsthistorisches Museum, Vienna
- Born: 4 September 1610; Bologna, Papal States
- Died: 21 May 1670 (aged 59); Bologna, Papal States
- Education: Giacomo Cavedone and Guido Reni
- Known for: Painting
- Movement: Baroque

Giovanni Andrea Sirani (4 September 1610 – 21 May 1670) was an Italian Baroque painter from Bologna. He is best known as the father of the painter Elisabetta Sirani.

== Biography ==
Born in Bologna on 4 September 1610, Sirani trained initially with Giacomo Cavedone, then worked in the studio with Guido Reni. He became Reni’s most devoted student and, eventually, the executor of his estate. Sirani painted numerous altarpieces for churches, primarily in his native city of Bologna. Notable examples include the Feast in the House of the Pharisee (1652; Certosa di Bologna), the Presentation in the Temple (c. 1643; Pinacoteca Nazionale di Bologna), and the Ascension of Christ (1656; Santa Maria Assunta, Borgo Panigale).

Following Reni’s death, Giovanni Sirani established his own school, where his most accomplished pupil was his daughter, Elisabetta. His later works reflect influences from the Venetian school and from Bolognese naturalist painters such as Francesco Gessi and Simone Cantarini. Around 1654–1655, Sirani developed severe arthritic gout that crippled his hands and left him unable to hold a brush. His daughter Elisabetta, then only 16 or 17 years old, took over the studio's commissions. Sirani died in 1670, five years after his daughter's premature death.
