= Oratory of San Giovanni Battista dei Fiorentini, Bologna =

Oratory in Bologna, Italy

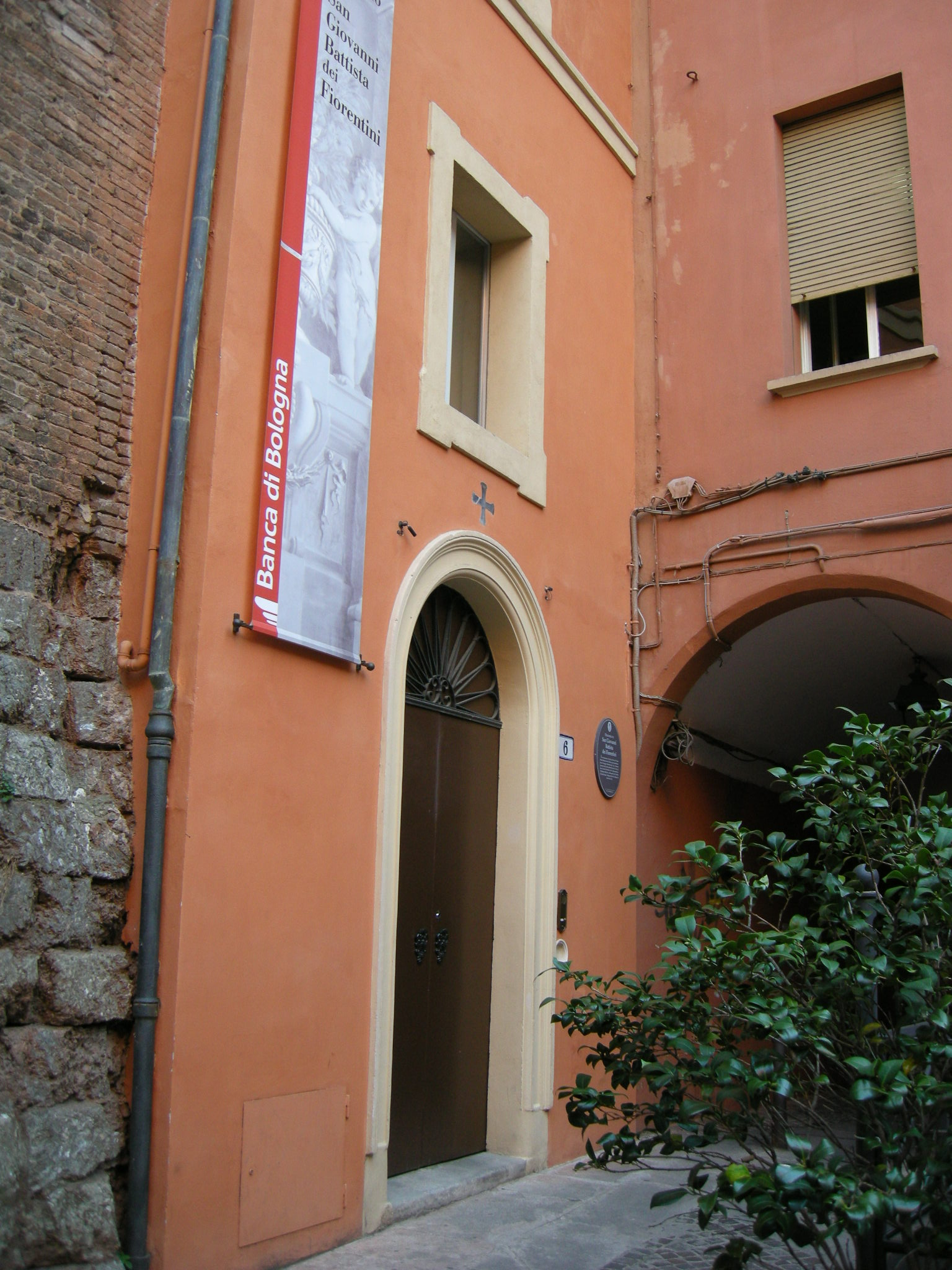

The Oratory of the San Giovanni Battista dei Fiorentini is a former confraternity meeting hall or oratory in central Bologna, found on Corte Galluzzi #6, and is part of the complex of the church of Santa Maria Rotonda dei Galluzzi and near San Petronio.

The hall of the oratory was refurbished in 1793 by Giuseppe Tubertini. The interior has a frescoed ceiling depicting the Glory of St John the Baptist (1668-71) by Mauro Aldrovandini and Domenico Baroni. The walls have large canvases and frescoes (1699) by Giuseppe Rolli and Paolo Guidi. The Torre di Galluzzi was erected in 1257. The property now belongs to the Banca di Bologna, and is used a home for meetings.
