= Antonio Rolli =

Italian painter

Antonio Rolli or Roli (1643–1695) is an Italian painter active painting quadrature during the Baroque period, mainly in his native Bologna.

== Biography ==
He trained with Angelo Michele Colonna and worked alongside his brother Giuseppe or Gioseffo Maria Rolli (1645-1727), who painted the figures. He painted the ceiling (1695) for the church of San Paolo Maggiore, Bologna. He died from a fall from a scaffold while completing this work. Paolo Guidi and his brother Gioseffo (or Giuseppe) helped complete the work. He helped decorate the oratory of Santa Maria della Neve, Bologna.

Giuseppe Antonio Caccioli trained with the Rolli brothers.

He is said to have died by jumping off a bridge near the church of San Paolo de' Barnabiti.
