= Mauro Aldrovandini =

Italian painter (1649–1680)

- Born: 1649; Bologna
- Died: 1680 (aged 30–31)
- Known for: Painting
- Movement: Baroque
- Children: Pompeo Agostino

Mauro Aldrovandini (1649–1680) was an Italian painter of the Baroque period. While he was most active in Bologna, and he was born there, he was said to have come from Rovigo. He mainly painted perspective views and architectural subjects (quadratura) in private houses and for theaters.

Along with the figure painter Domenico Baroni, he painted the quadratura in fresco for the Oratory of San Giovanni Battista dei Fiorentini. The frescoed ceiling depicting the Glory of St John the Baptist (1668–71). This is a style in which he trained his more famous nephew Tommaso Aldrovandini.

He also painted the second of the fifteen chapels, each one celebrating the fifteen mysteries of the Rosary and which line the long portico leading up to the Sanctuary of the Madonna di San Luca in Bologna.

Mauro's son, Pompeo Agostino, (1677-Rome, 1735) was also a painter of quadratura and landscapes.
