= Lorenzo Garbieri =

Italian painter

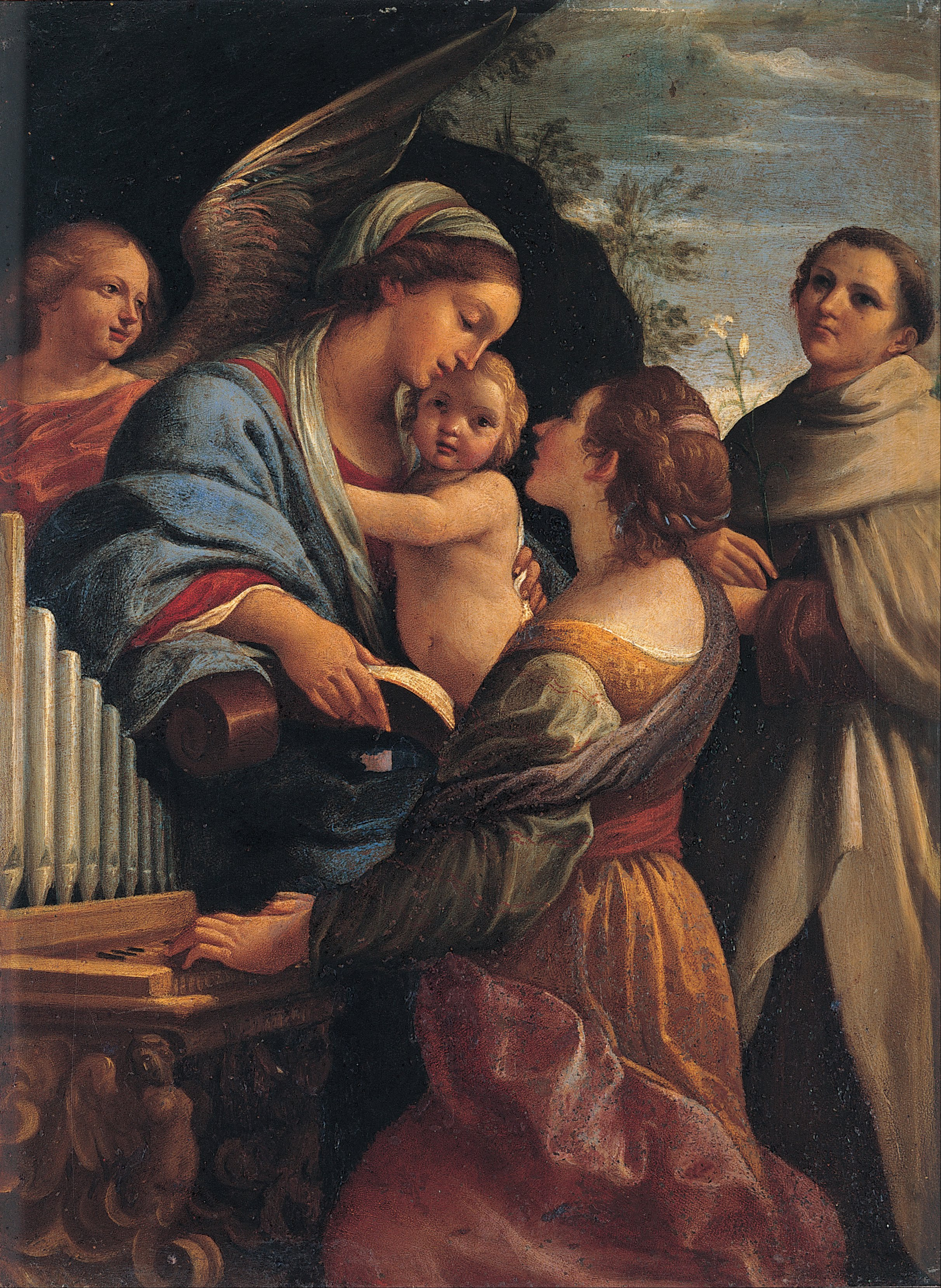
Madonna with the Child, Saint Cecily and Saint Albert (1615), oil on copper, 320 x 240 cm, Capitoline Museums, Rome

Lorenzo Garbieri (1580 – 5 April 1654) was an Italian painter of the early-Baroque period, active mainly in Bologna. He was one of the painters in the studio of Ludovico Carracci and is sometimes called il nipote dei Carracci. He was said to be one of the most successful imitators of Ludovico, to whose style he added the character of Caravaggio.

He painted the Plague of Milan in the chapel of San Carlo at the church of the Barnabites. He painted St Paul resuscitating a youth for the church of the Congregation of the Oratory of Saint Philip Neri in Fano. He painted the Martyrdom of St Felicita and her seven sons for San Maurizio in Mantua.

He painted five canvases (1613) for the chapel of the Annunciation in the church of San Bartolomeo, Modena, including Birth of the Virgin, Annunciation. He had also paintings made for Milan and Reggio-Emilia. One of his painting his located at the Dinan's Museum.

Rejecting an offer to become court painter at Mantua, he returned to Bologna to take a bride with a rich dowry, after which his career declined. His son and pupil, Carlo Garbieri, was a history painter.

== Painting ==
- Lorenzo Garbieri, La Descente de Croix, XVIIe siècle, huile sur toile, 115 x 95 cm, coll. Ville de Dinan – Musée de Dinan
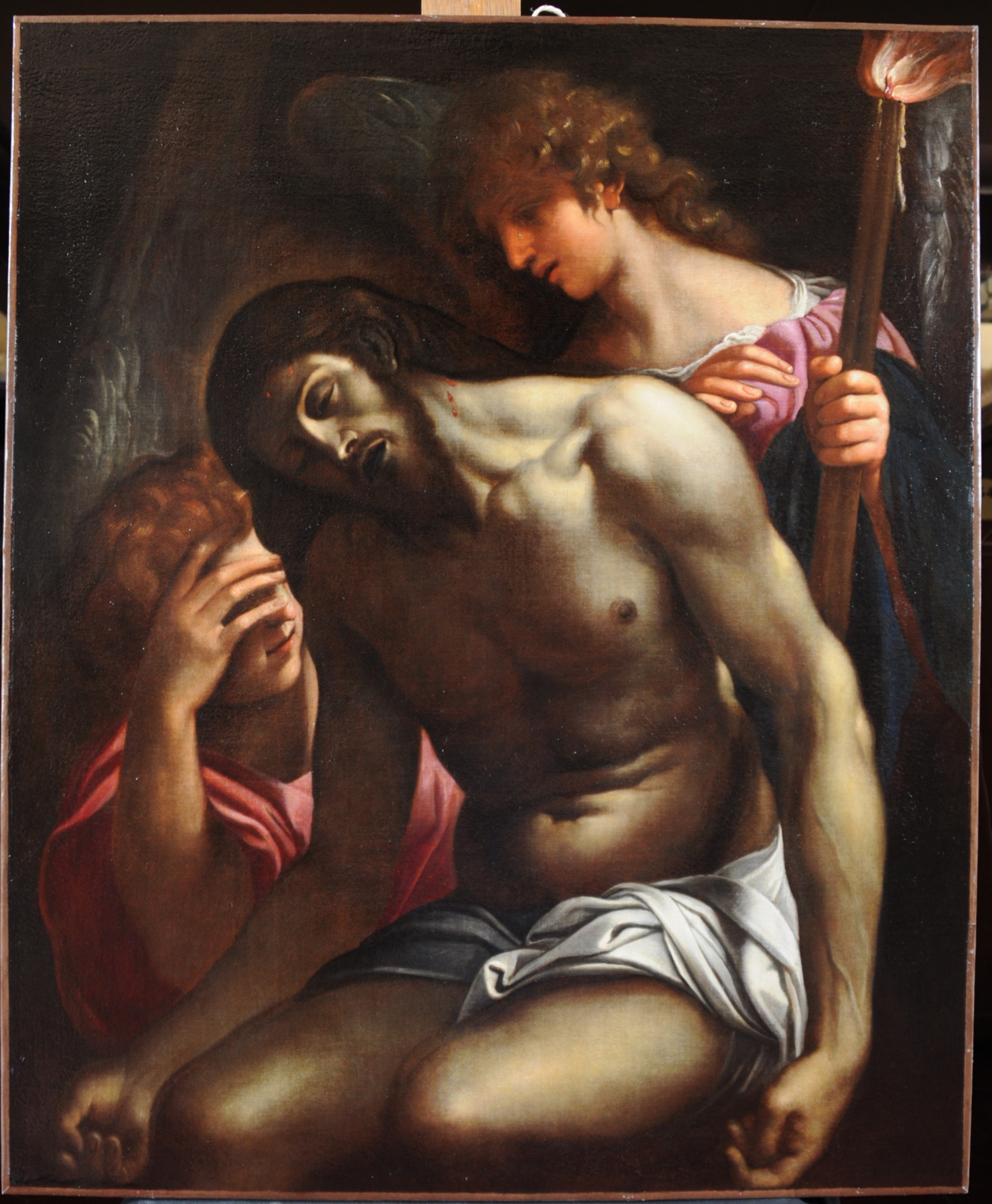
  La Descente de Croix, oil on canvas, 115 x 95 cm, Musée de Dinan

== Bibliography ==
- Farquhar, Maria (1855). Ralph Nicholson Wornum (ed.). Biographical catalogue of the principal Italian painters. London: Woodfall & Kinder. p. 69.
- Marchese Antonio Bolognini Amorini (1843). Vite de Pittori ed Artifici Bolognesi. Tipografia Governativa alla Volpe, Bologna. pp. 119–126.
