= San Paolo Maggiore, Bologna =

Coordinates: 44.491271°N 11.339908°E

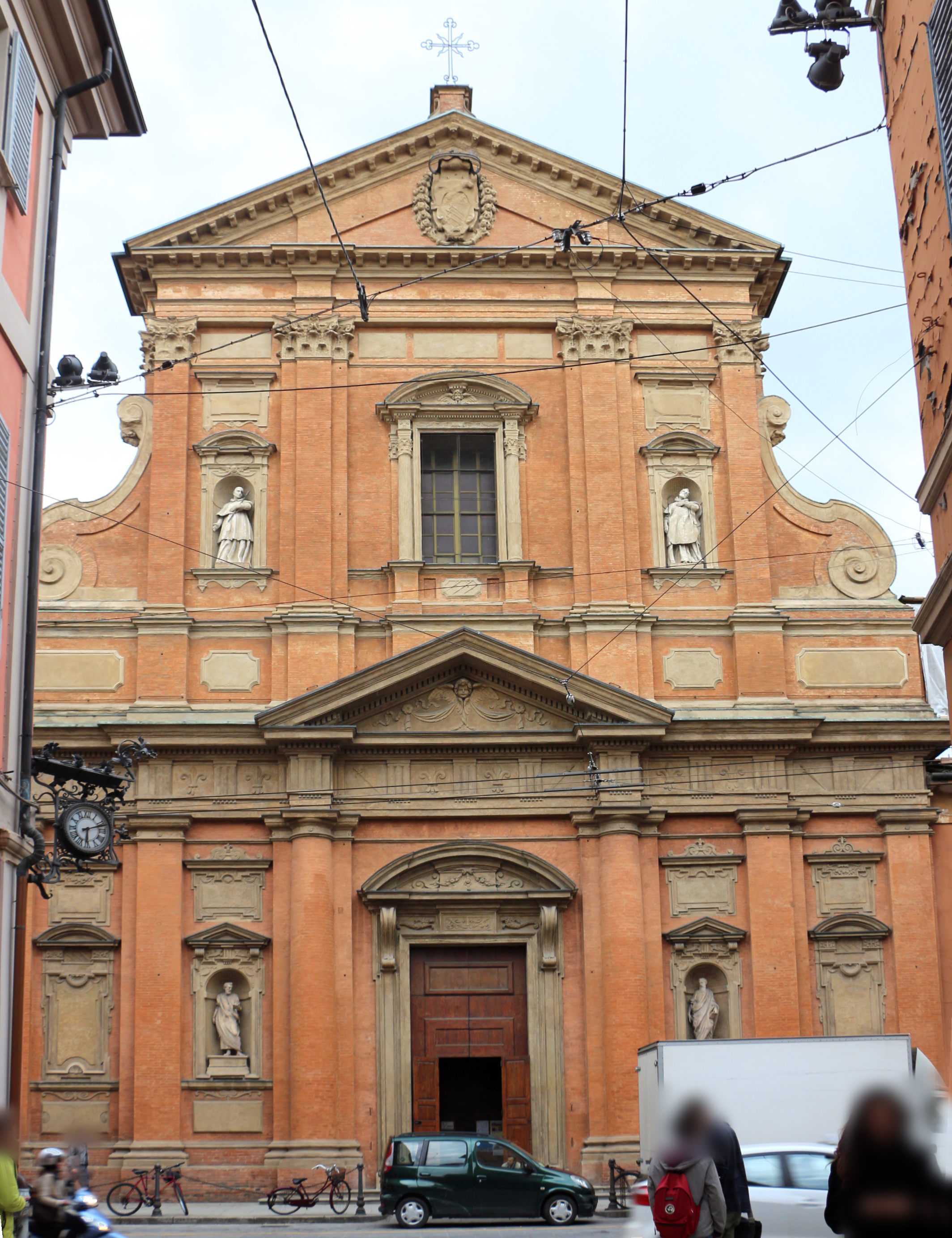
Facade of San Paolo

San Paolo Maggiore, also known as San Paolo Decollato, is a Baroque-style, Roman Catholic basilica church located on Via Carbonari #18 in Bologna, region of Emilia-Romagna, Italy.

== History ==
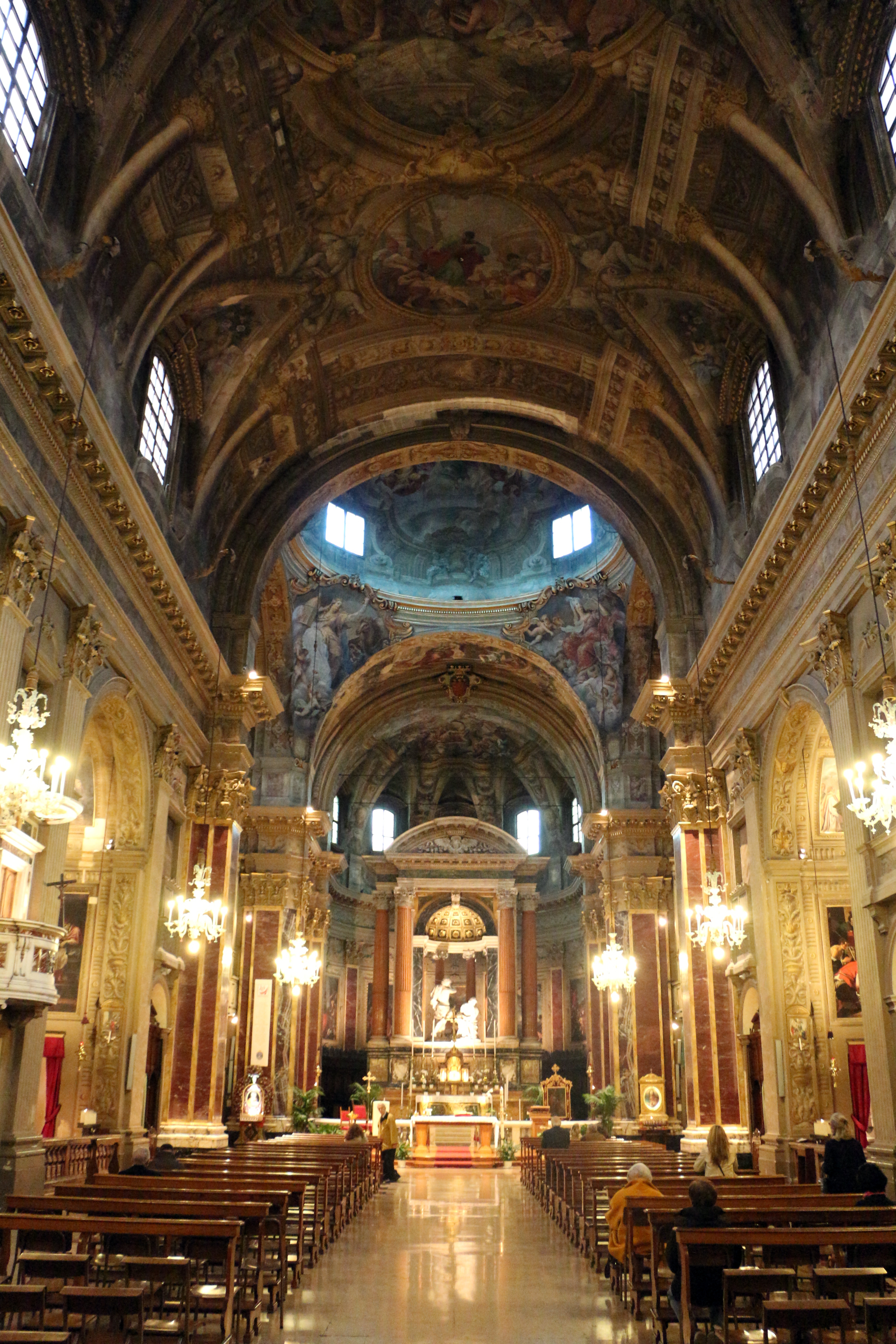
Nave towards main altar.

The church was commissioned between 1606 and 1611 by the Barnabites from the architect Giovanni Magenta or Mazenta. Patronage for this church was mainly derived from the Prince Virgilio Spada, brother of Cardinal Bernardino Spada. The Barnabites, also known as the Clerics Regular of St Paul, named this church as Maggiore to distinguish it from two other San Paolo's in Bologna. Between 1634 and 1636 the facade was built to designs by Ercole Fichi. The facade, in brick and stone, has statues of St Peter and Paul, respectively by Domenico Maria Mirandola and G. Cruventi.

During the Napoleonic invasion, the Barnabites were suppressed, and the church was made a parish church in 1819. Closed again later, it was reconsecrated in 1878. In 1959 it was restored to the Barnabites, and two years later raised to the designation of Minor Basilica by Pope John XXIII.

Inside the building, the vaults were frescoed with scenes of the St Paul in the Areopagus of Athens by Antonio and Giuseppe Rolli. Antonio died after a fall from a scaffold, and the work was completed by his brother. The cupola, apse, sacristy and two chapels in the transept were frescored with quadratura by Pietro Farina, and figures by Giuseppe Antonio Caccioli

The main altar (1643-1650) features a dramatic marble sculptural group Beheading of St Paul (sculpted in Rome in 1634, but not in place till 1644) by Alessandro Algardi. Algardi also completed the bronze plaques on the altar. His works were commissioned by the Prince Spada. The architectural setting of the altar, described by some as a Baldacchino, has Corinthian columns and a protruding portico is based on a design attributed to the architect Borromini.

The church altars have masterpieces by Guercino and Giuseppe Maria Crespi. In the second chapel is a canvas depicting Paradise by Lodovico Carracci. Nicolo Tornioli painted a Cain Killing Abel and Jacob wrestling with angel for the church.

In the third chapel has a Nativity and Adoration of the Magi by Giacomo Cavedoni, with a Flight to Egypt, Circumcision, and Jesus among the Doctors in the ceiling. The fourth chapel has a St Gregory shows God the Father to the Souls in Purgatory by Guercino. The wooden choir stalls are highly decorated with engravings. The eighth chapel has a Communion of St Jerome by Lucio Massari. The ninth chapel has a Baptism of Jesus, Birth, and Death of St John the Baptist by Giacomo Cavedoni.

== Gallery ==
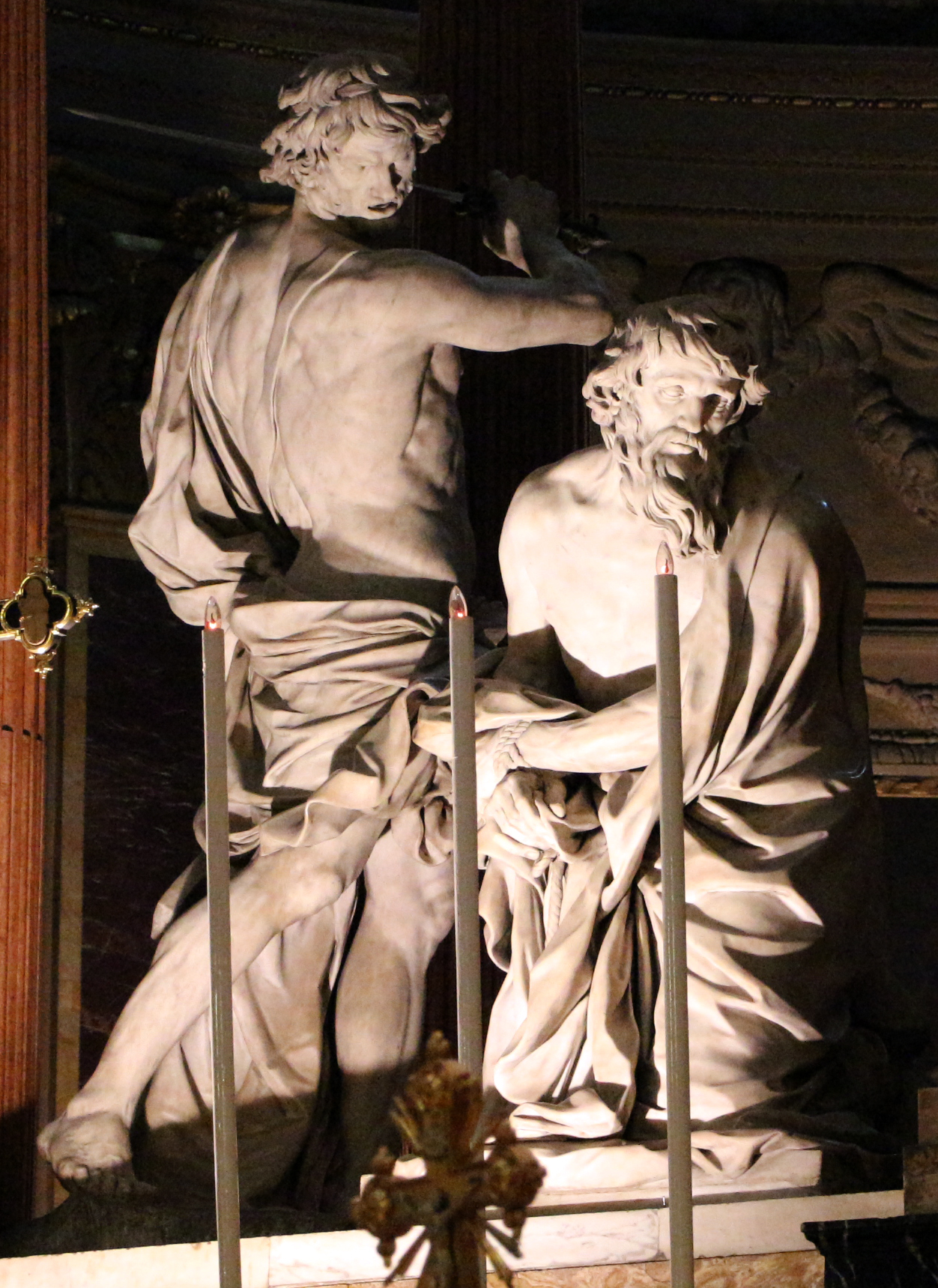
Beheading of St Paul by Algardi

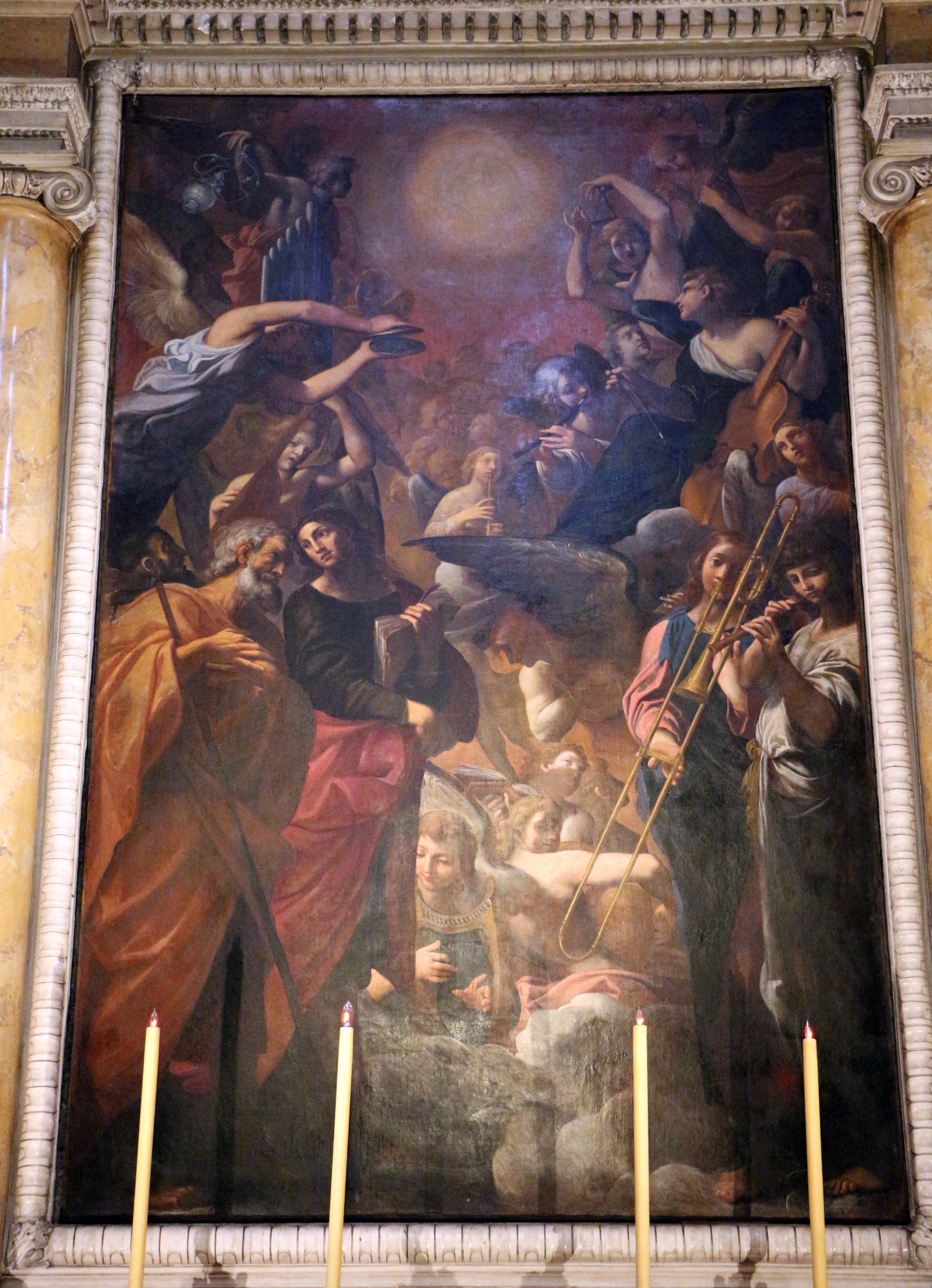
Paradise by Carracci

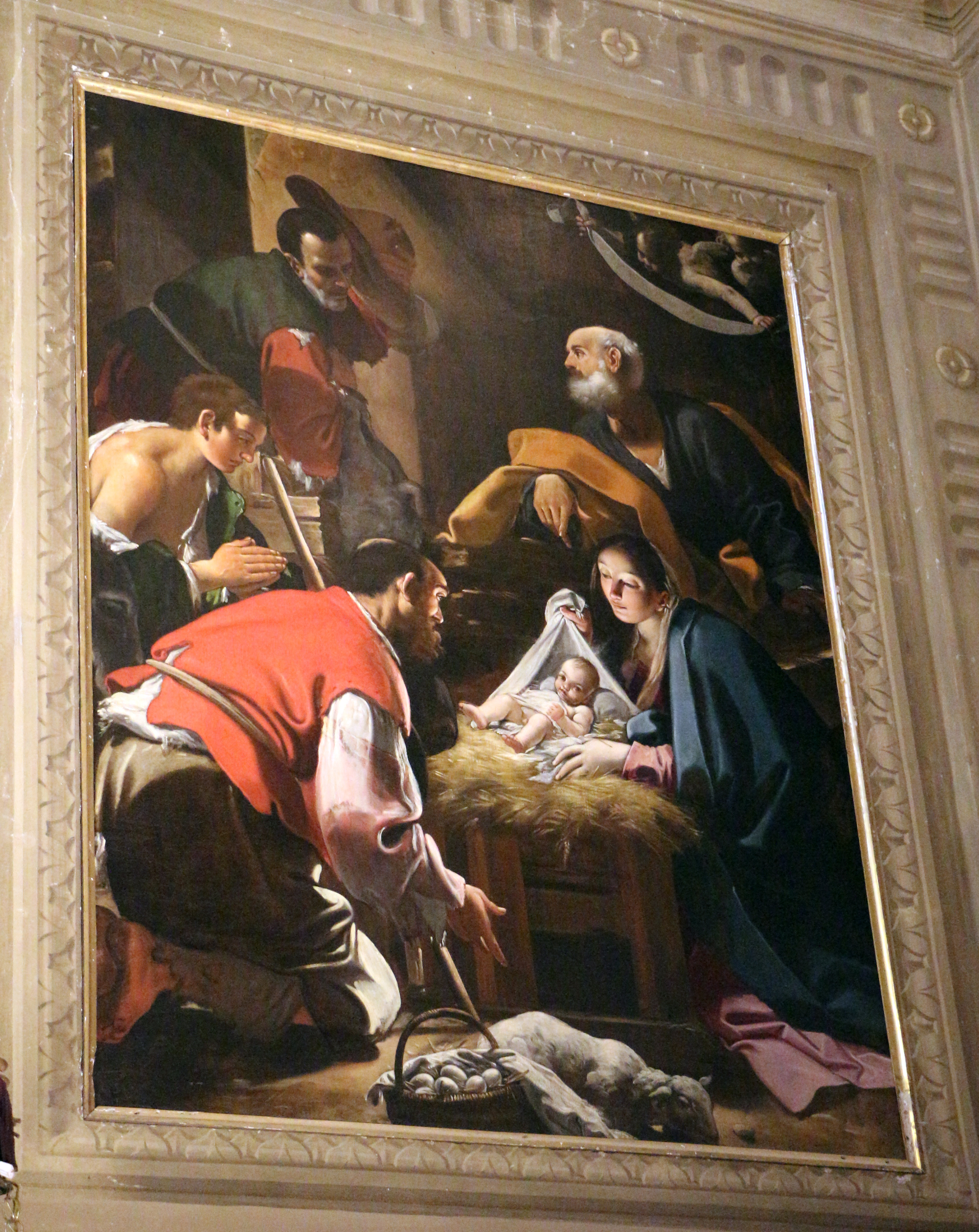
Adoration of the Shepherds by Cavedoni
