= Giuseppe Tubertini =

Italian architect

Giuseppe Tubertini (1759–1831) was an Italian architect active mainly in Bologna in a Neoclassical-style.

== Life ==
Among Tubertini's works are the cupola di Santa Maria della Vita (1787), the hall of the Pantheon at the Certosa of Bologna, the Sferisterio della Montagnola, and the Palazzo of the Scuole Pie, erected next to the convent of San Domenico. In 1793, the Oratory of San Giovanni Battista dei Fiorentini at Bologna, the hall of the oratory was refurbished. The Giuoco del Pallone (1822) was also built by Turbertini in a Doric order, became home of the Scuole Pie (1838). It was erected to align with the adjacent Palazzo Ranuzzi Bacciocchi.
