= Santa Maria della Neve, Pisogne =

Roman Catholic church in Pisogne, Italy

Coordinates: 45°48′24″N 10°06′44″E

Santa Maria della Neve
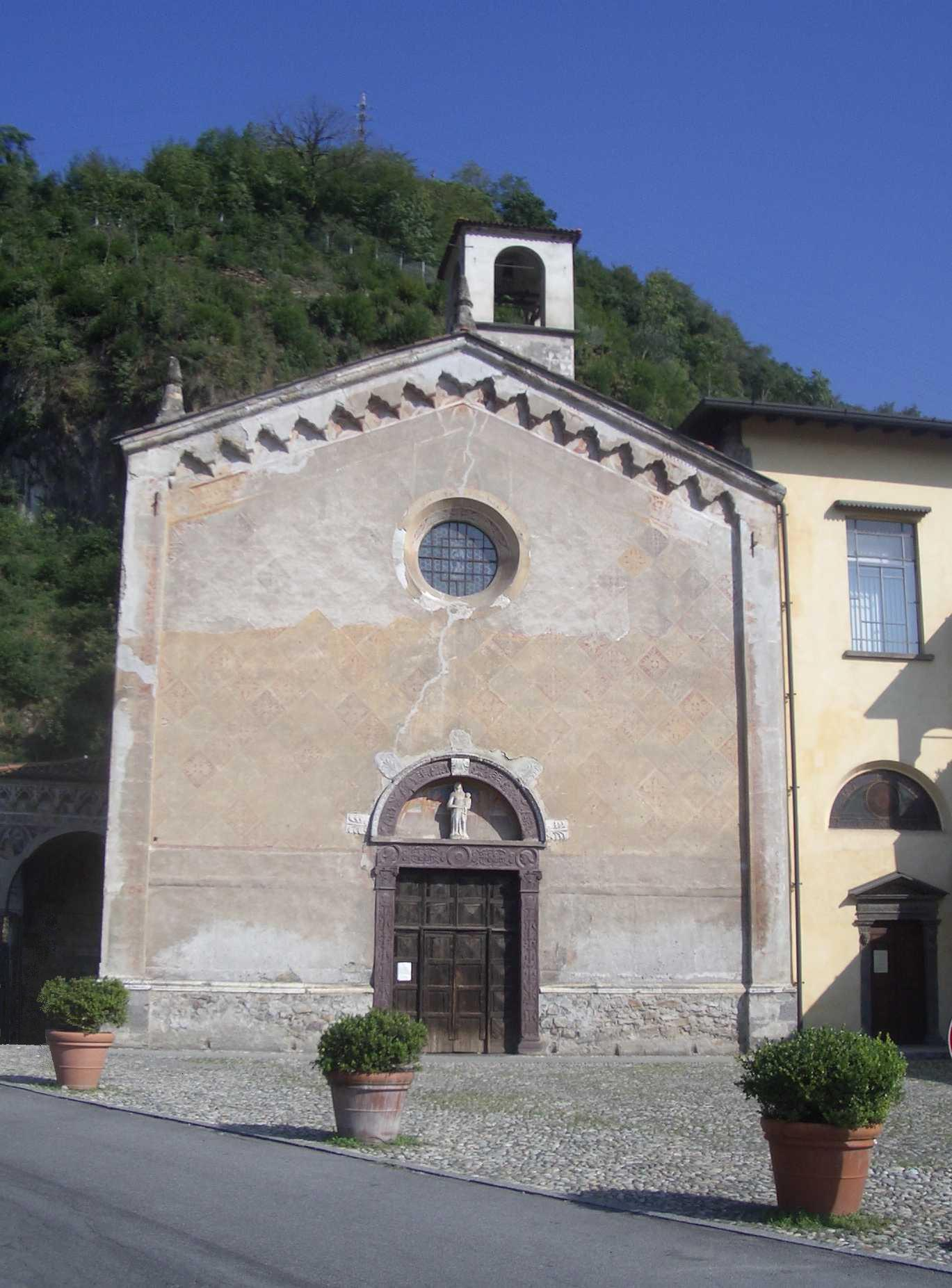
- Façade of the church.

Religion
- Affiliation: Roman Catholic
- Province: Brescia
- Ecclesiastical or organisational status: National monument
- Status: Active

Location
- Location: Pisogne, Italy
- Interactive map of Santa Maria della Neve

Architecture
- Type: Church
- Style: Romanesque
- Groundbreaking: 15th century
- Completed: 15th century

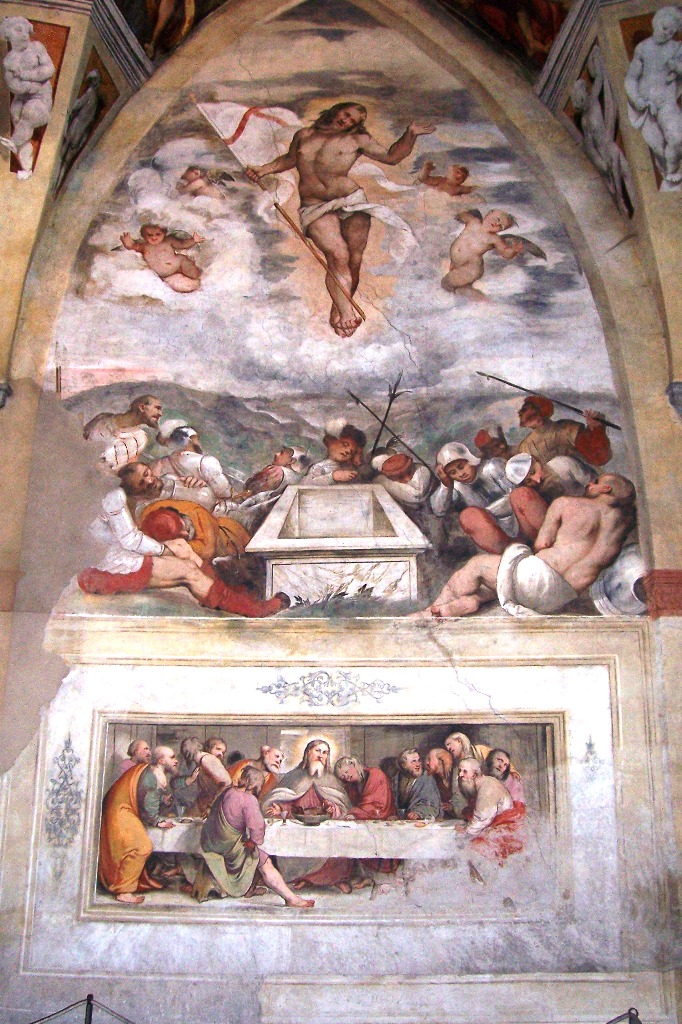
Frescos of the Resurrection by Romanino.

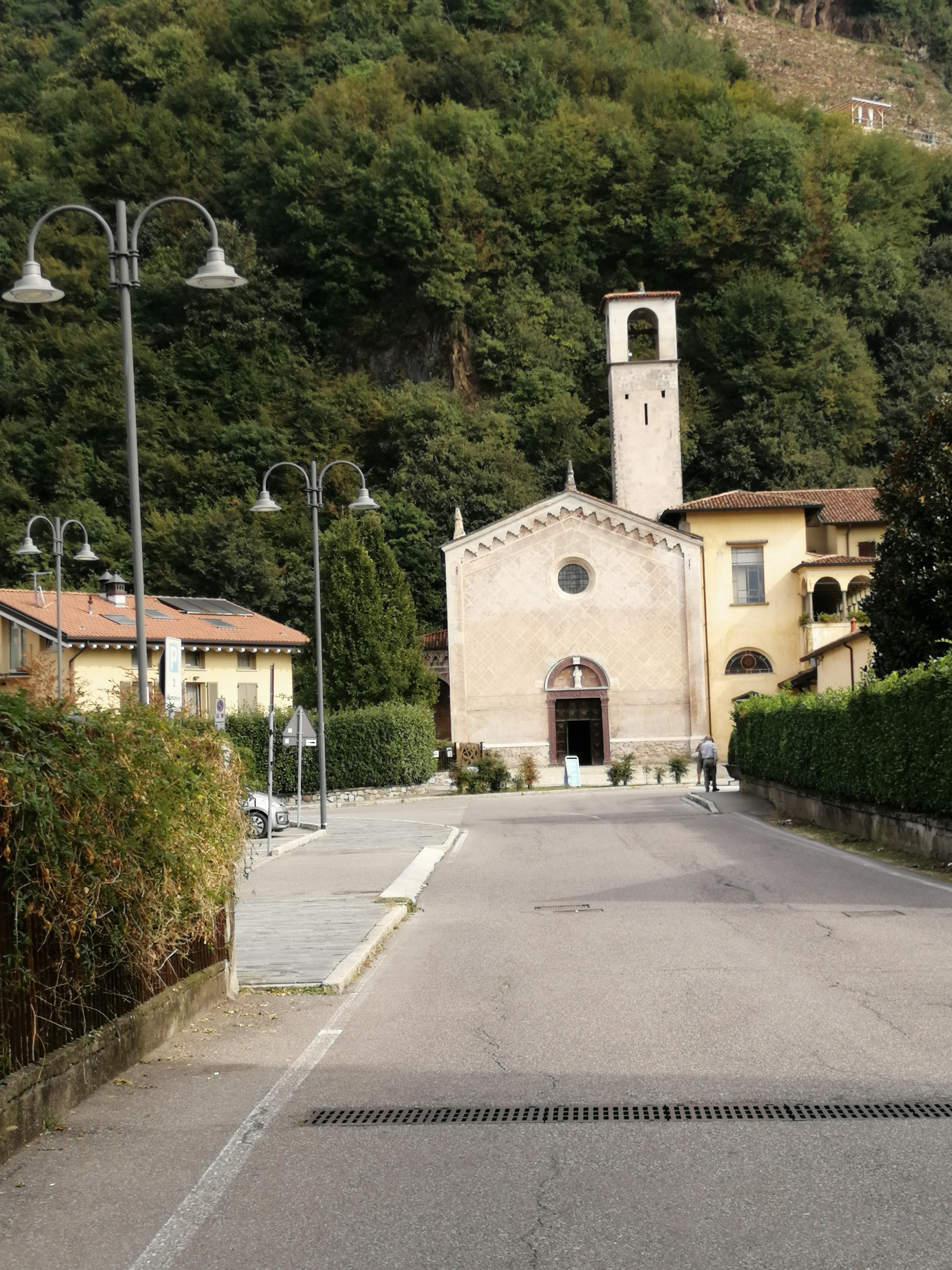
view of Santa Maria della Neve from the street

Church of Santa Maria della Neve (Italian: Chiesa di Santa Maria della Neve) is a Roman Catholic church in the town of Pisogne, in the province of Brescia, part of the region of Lombardy, northern Italy.

Walls of the interior contains fragments of the cycle of frescos by Romanino depicting scenes from the Passion of Christ.

== History ==
The church of Santa Maria della Neve was built at the end of the 15th century at the crossroads of the two main suburban roads and the trade axis, namely the 'Valeriana' road leading to the Alpine Pass and the road leading to the mines and the Trompia Valley. This place was a busy transit point and this building was a very popular Marian shrine. For this reason, in the early 1630s, it was completely renovated: two porticos connected to the central body for the reception and welcoming of pilgrims, and a terminal chapel on the south portico. The three Gothic windows were closed in order to obtain a continuous surface suitable for the new decorative scheme. The space of the south porch on the right was closed in the 16th century and has served as a private church since then.

== Church interior ==
The interior is interrupted by horizontal arches, which divide the space into three bays, completely covered with painted narratives. The painting extends to the back wall, the presbyterian arch and the vault, and is divided into sails by an illusory frame. Girolamo Romanino, (born in Brescia between 1484 and 1487 and died after 1562) was among the most important interpreters of the Lombard school, worked in this church in 1534 and frescoed much of what can be seen today.

Upon entering, can be found a complicated itinerary, dedicated to meditation and prayer for the "mysteries" of personal Christology.

This story presents the important plots of Christ's story: the Crocifissione (Crucifixion) on the counter-façade, the Orazione nell'orto (Oration in the Garden), the Ecce homo, the Andata al Calvario (Going to Calvary) on the north wall, the Resurrezione (Resurrection), the Discesa al Limbo (Descent into Limbo) and the Ascensione (Ascension) on the south wall.

These large scenes completely occupy the surface delineated by the pointed arch, and next to them there are other smaller plots on the junction: from the north, La cena in casa di Simone and Cristo davanti a Pilato (The Supper in Simon's House and Christ before Pilate); the Flagellazione (Flagellation) and the Incoronazione di Spine (Coronation of Thorns) alongside the Crocisiffione (Crucifixion); on the south wall, the Entrata in Gerusalemme (Entry into Jerusalem), the Lavanda dei Piedi (Washing of Feet) and the Ultima Cena (Last Supper).

The high and low scenes are interrelated: the plots of the sacred story are not actually arranged in chronological order, but are organised according to the correspondence between the large paintings and the small paintings and the cross system between the scenes addressed by the individual.
