= Giuseppe Zambeccari =

Italian physician and anatomist

- Born: 19 March 1655; Castelfranco di Sotto, Grand Duchy of Tuscany
- Died: 13 December 1728 (aged 73); Pisa, Grand Duchy of Tuscany
- Education: University of Pavia
- Occupations: Physician; Anatomist; Surgeon; University teacher
- Partner: Anna Maria Palmieri
- Children: 4
- Parent(s): Bernardino Zambeccari and Livia Zambeccari (née Maraffi)
- Scientific career
- Fields: Experimental anatomy and physiology
- Workplaces: Hospital of Santa Maria Nuova; University of Pisa
- Doctoral advisor: Lorenzo Bellini

Giuseppe Zambeccari (19 March 1655 – 13 December 1728) was an Italian physician who is considered one of the pioneers of experimental anatomy and physiology, conducting experiments on live animals, such as dogs and chicken, a practice then not considered unacceptable.

== Biography ==
Zambeccari was born in Castelfranco di Sotto in a family from Pontremoli that included clergymen, physicians and other professions apart from a few noble relatives in Bologna. His father was a notary and was for sometime chancellor, and his mother may also have come from a noble family. His early studies are not known but he sought admission in the Ducal College of Pisa and received approval, graduating in 1679 with studies under Lorenzo Bellini (1643–1704) and Alessandro Marchetti (1633–1714). He then studied under Francesco Redi working as an intern at the Ospedale di Santa Maria Nuova and living at the home of Redi as was student tradition. In 1680 he conducted experiments on the organs of dogs to examine their functions. One of them involved the removal of the spleen after which several animals survived. He then examined their organs again to look for changes. He was able to identify that removal of one kidney did not kill the animal as also removal of parts of the liver. According to the custom of the time, Zambeccari lodged in the house of his professor and there in 1680 conducted his most important experiments in physiology, which consisted in removing various internal organs from live animals (mainly dogs) in order to acquire a better understanding of what functions they performed in relation to the whole organism. In 1689 he became a professor of medicine in Pisa and in 1704 headed the anatomy section. Among his works was a study of the medicinal baths at Bagni di Lucca and San Giuliano (1712) and his studies on animals published in 1680 as Esperienze intorno a diverse viscere tagliate a diversi animali viventi.

Zambeccari married Ann Maria Palmieri of Pisa in 1690 and they had a son and three daughters (two becoming nuns). Zambeccari was very religious and was involved in the examination of a Maria Caterina Brondi, attesting the presence of stigmata and supporting her sainthood.
