= Santa Maria della Pioggia, Bologna =

Church in central Bologna, Italy

Coordinates: 44.4988°N 11.3415°E

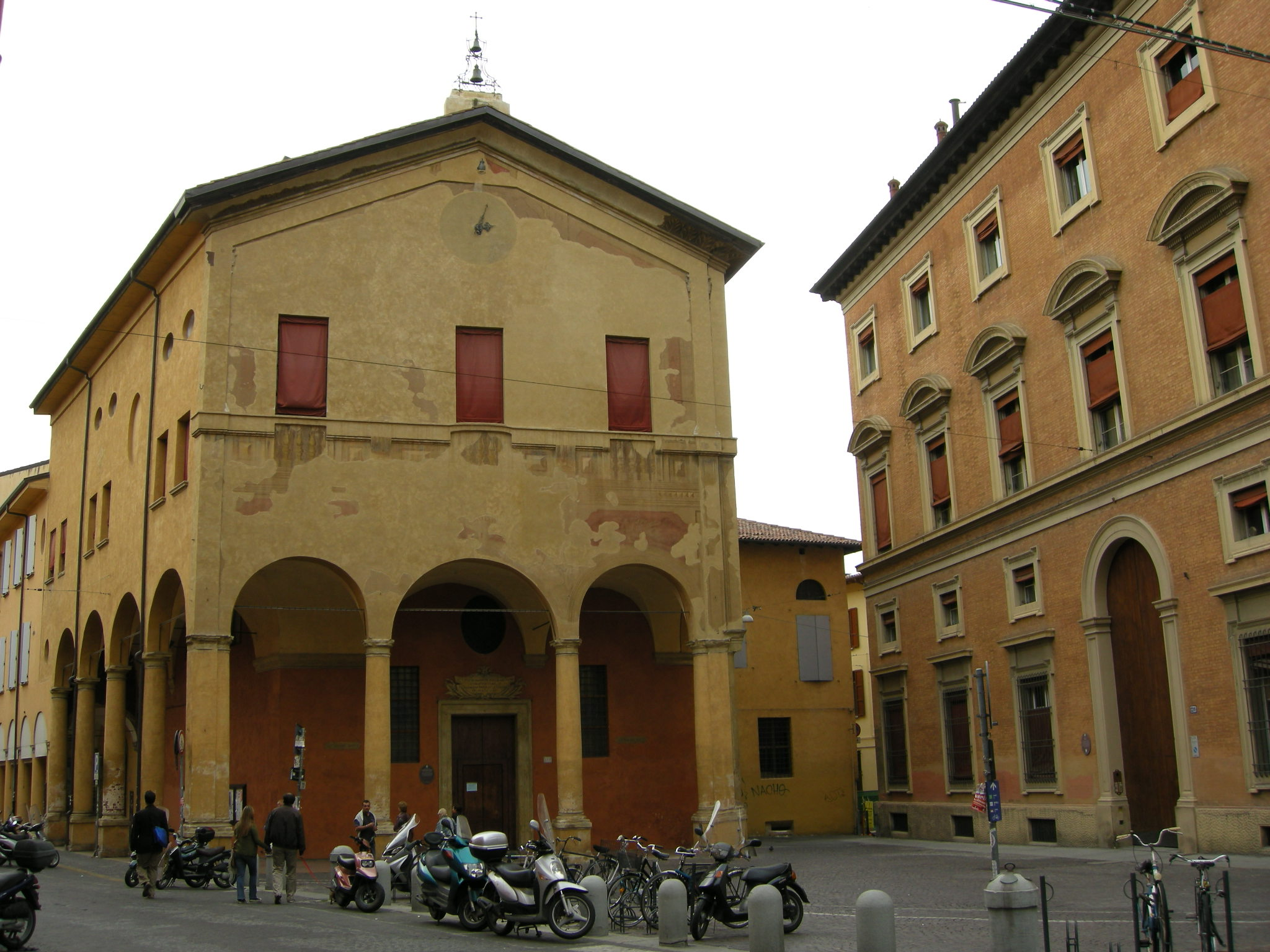

The Sanctuary of Santa Maria della Pioggia is a small church, located on Via Riva Reno 122, between Galliera road and Riva di Reno road in central Bologna, Italy. It was once the Oratory of San Bartolomeo di Reno.

== History ==
By the year 1204, the Oratory of St Bartolomeo di Reno at this site sheltered a venerated icon of the Madonna and Child. After the plague of 1527, the adjacent buildings were transformed from a hostel for pilgrims into an orphanage. Over the centuries, the church, located below the oratory, was enlarged and refurbished, gaining the name of the Madonna della Pioggia after a procession to the church was followed by a rainfall ending a drought. Major reconstruction occurred in 1729 under Alfonso Torreggiani.

The icon of the Madonna and Child with seven angel heads at the main altar is attributed to the 15th-century painter Michele di Matteo. The church has three paintings by Agostino Carracci: Adoration by the Shepherds, St Bartolomeo di Reno and the two Prophets in the arch of the chapel. Other artworks include: a Santo Bartolomeo by Francesco Monti; a St Vincent Ferrer by Antonio Crespi, and St Luigi Gonzaga by Ercole Graziani. Other paintings attributed to Graziani include the following works in the sacristy: St Peter after the triple denial of Christ, Mystical Marriage of St Catherine; Burial of St Catherine of Alexandria. Also in the sacristy is a Camillo dè Lellis tending to the sick by Dante Bizzotto ((1911–1967); a statue representing St Anthony of Padua and Child Jesus by Giovanni Antonio Raimondi; and an Enthroned Madonna and Child with St Catherine and Lucy by Alessandro Stiatici.

The stairwell to the oratory is frescoed with a Landscape with St Bartholomew by Ludovico Mattioli.

The sanctuary has been recently restored and now owned by the Pii Istituti Educativi (Charitable Educational Institutions).
