= Giuseppe Rolli =

Italian painter

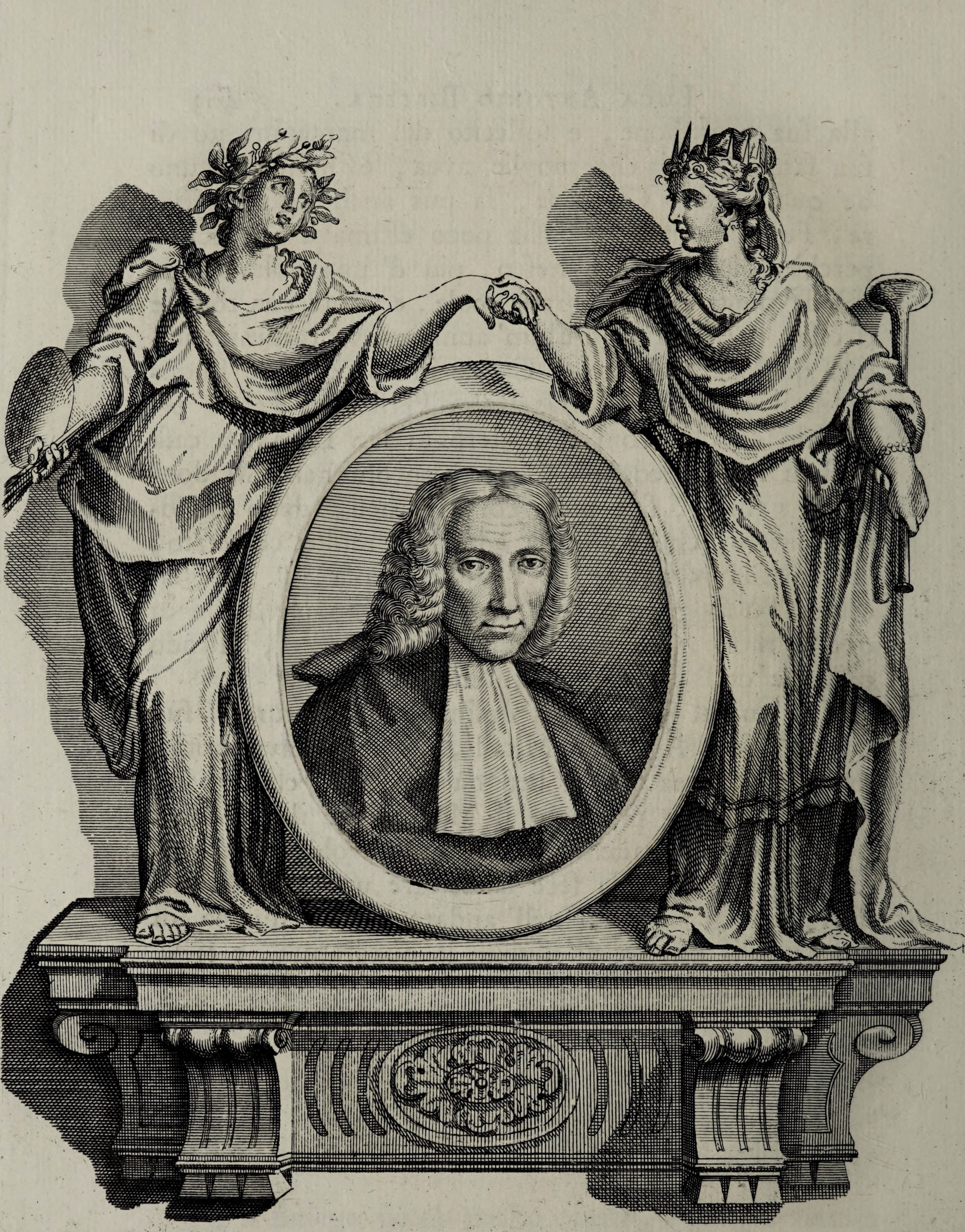
Giuseppe Maria Rolli

Giuseppe Maria Rolli or Roli (1645 – 17 November 1727) is an Italian painter and engraver active during the Baroque period, mainly in his native Bologna.

== Biography ==
He was sent by his father to work along with Giuseppe Antonio Caccioli and later under Domenico Maria Canuti. He worked alongside his brother Antonio (1643-1695), who painted the quadratura.

Together the brothers painted for the Casa Ranuzzi in Bologna, Casa Miti in Imola, at the Camaldolese church of Monte d'Alvernia, at the church of the Scalzi and the Refectory of the Canons Lateranensi in Bologna, and at the cupoletta of San Lionardo in Bologna. By himself, Giuseppe painted the ceiling of the church of the Barnabites, the Oratory of San Giovanni Battista dei Fiorentini (1699), and the cupola of San Bartolomeo. He was recruited by the Prince of Baden to paint mythologic themes in frescoes. He gained a large inheritance and stopped painting, but then lost his fortune in later years.
