= Pedrini =

Pedrini is an Italian surname. Notable people with the surname include:

- Daniele Pedrini (born 1976), Italian ski mountaineer
- Domenico Pedrini (1728–1800), Italian painter
- Enrico Pedrini (1940–2012), Italian academic, theorist and art collector
- Filippo Pedrini (1763–1856), Italian painter
- Matteo Pedrini (born 2000), Italian footballer
- Teodorico Pedrini (1671–1746), Italian Vincentian priest, missionary, musician, and composer
