= Palazzo Pallavicini at Via San Felice =

Coordinates: 44.4968°N 11.3344°E

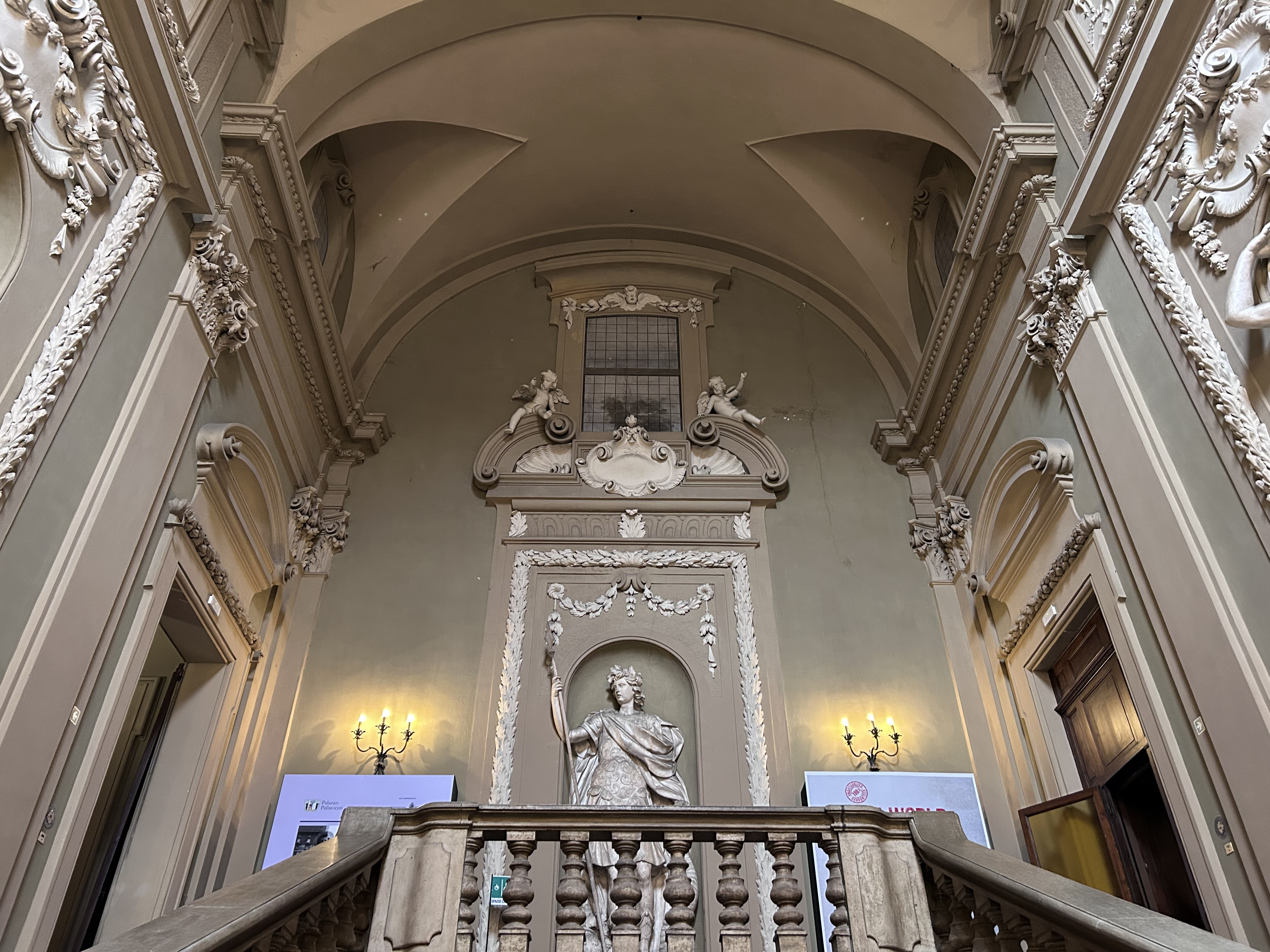
Monumental staircase, with Stucco work by Giuseppe Borelli.

The Palazzo Pallavicini is a sprawling 15th-century palace located on Via San Felice #24 in Bologna, region of Emilia Romagna, Italy. It extends to Via del Pratello and Via de'Coltellini. There is another Palazzo Bargellini-Pallavicini-Panzacchi in Bologna located on Via Santo Stefano 45.

== History ==
The palace has belonged to many families including the Vila, Volta, Marsili, and Alamandini, before it was purchased by Gian Luca Pallavicini in 1765. The left (east) part of the facade was reconstructed in 1788 based on designs of Alessandro Amadesi.

The baroque staircase was designed circa 1690 by Luigi Casoli. The interior has a grand salon frescoed in 1690 by Giovanni Antonio Burrini. It also has some late 18th century decorations commissioned between 1789 and 1792 by Giuseppe Pallavicini, and completed by Flaminio Minozzi, Filippo Pedrini, Vincenzo Martinelli, Giuseppe Antonio Valliani and Serafino Barozzi, with stuccoes by Giacomo Rossi.

On March 26, 1770, in the palace's Sala della Musica, a young Amadeus Mozart performed here.

== Links ==
- Site of the Palazzo Pallavicini
