= Antonio Gionima =

Italian painter (1697–1732)

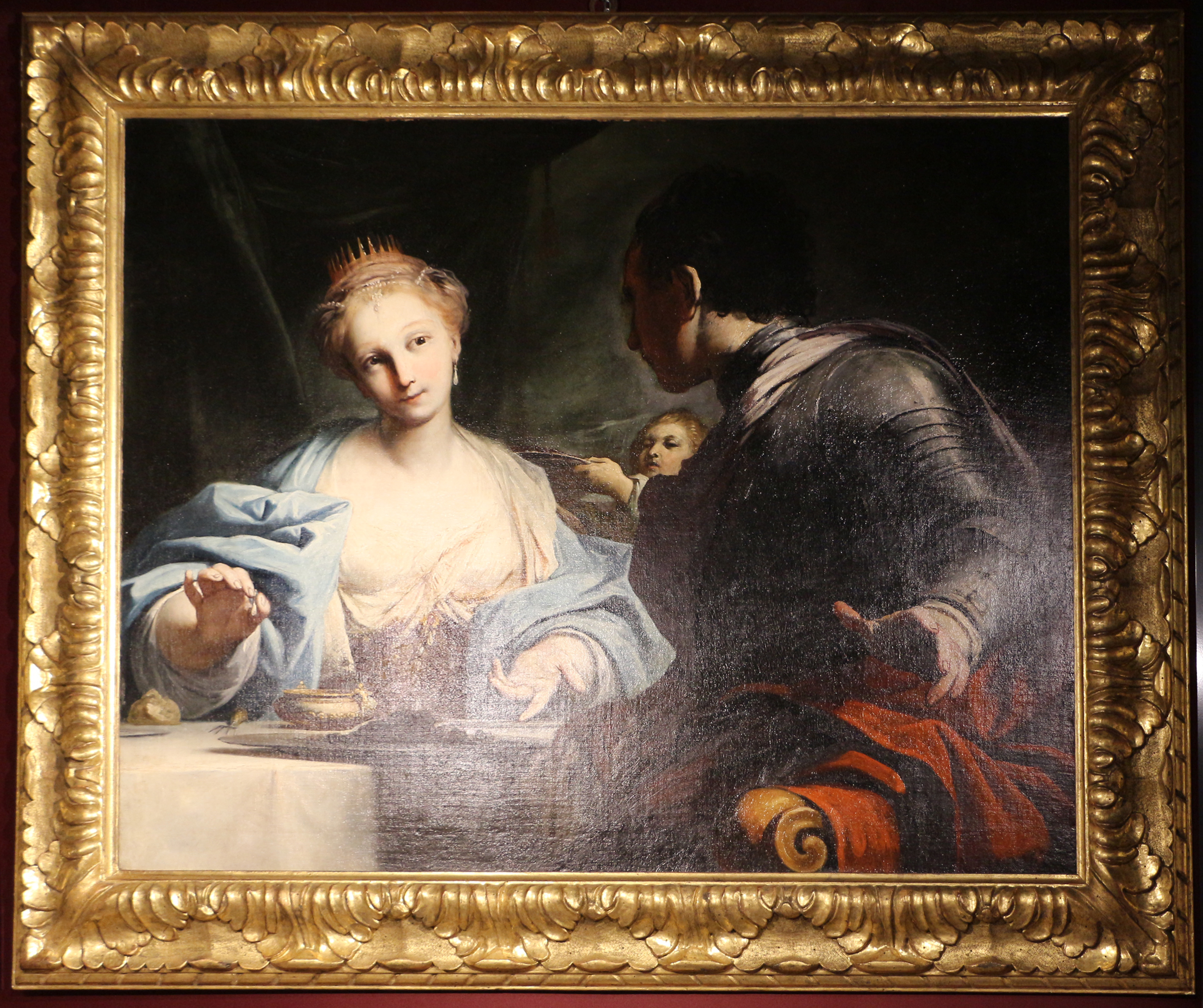
Anthonius and Cleopatra, 1720-30 circa, Brescia, private collection

Antonio Gionima (1697–1732) was an Italian painter of the late-Baroque period.

Born in Venice from a family of Padua, where his father Simone Gionima (a pupil of Cesare Gennari) and grandfather had been artists, he was first educated by his father, then by Aureliano Milani, and then by Giuseppe Maria Crespi. He died young, leaving works highly prized at Bologna. His picture of St. Florian and accompanying martyrs was engraved by Girolamo Mattioli; and a grand canvas depicting the History of Haman was painted for the Ranuzzi family. He died at the age of 35 years.
