= The Death of Saint Francis =

Lost painting by Annibale Carracci

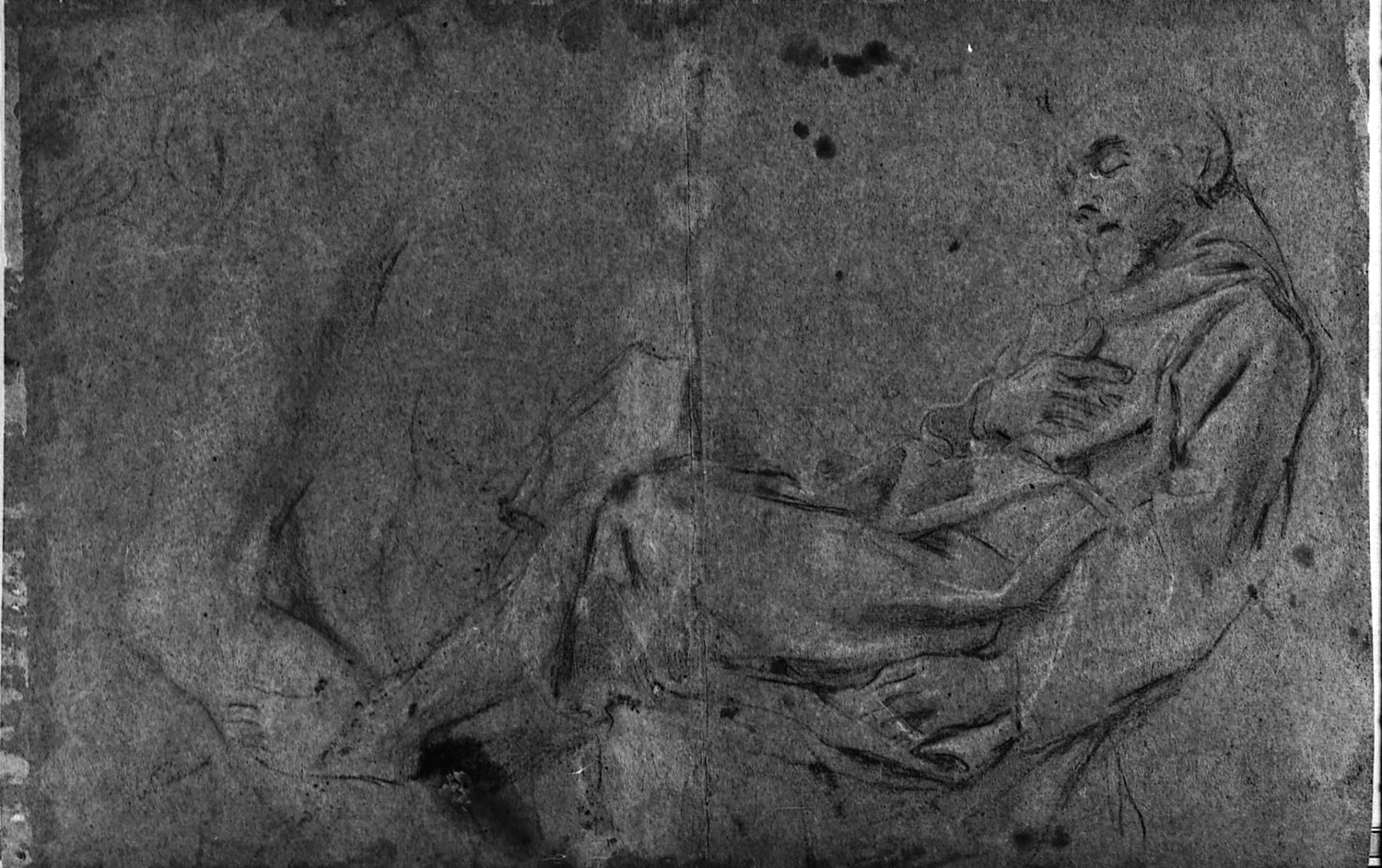
Preparatory drawing by Annibale (Royal Library, Windsor Castle)

The Death of Saint Francis is the probable subject of two lost paintings by the Italian Baroque artist Annibale Carracci, both possibly dating to 1597–1598. One is known solely through a print and the other through a series of painted copies.

== First version ==
The first composition on the subject is recorded in a print after it by Gérard Audran, which is inscribed “Hannibal Carrache pinxit” ("Annibale Carracci painted [it]") and a drawing after it by the Bolognese painter Aureliano Milani. No documents survive to date the work behind it or to elucidate its provenance and it is absent from all contemporary and early sources on Annibale. One autograph preparatory drawing for that painting does survive at the Royal Library in Windsor Castle, showing a reclining figure of the saint similar to that in the print. The drawing was probably for a now lost painting by Carracci which Audran then reproduced. One the reverse of the Royal Library drawing is a study of a nude young man, perhaps linked with plans for the Galleria Farnese. If so, this probably means the nude post-dates the Saint Francis study, with the latter produced about the same time as work began on the Galleria Farnese, that is, around 1597–1598.

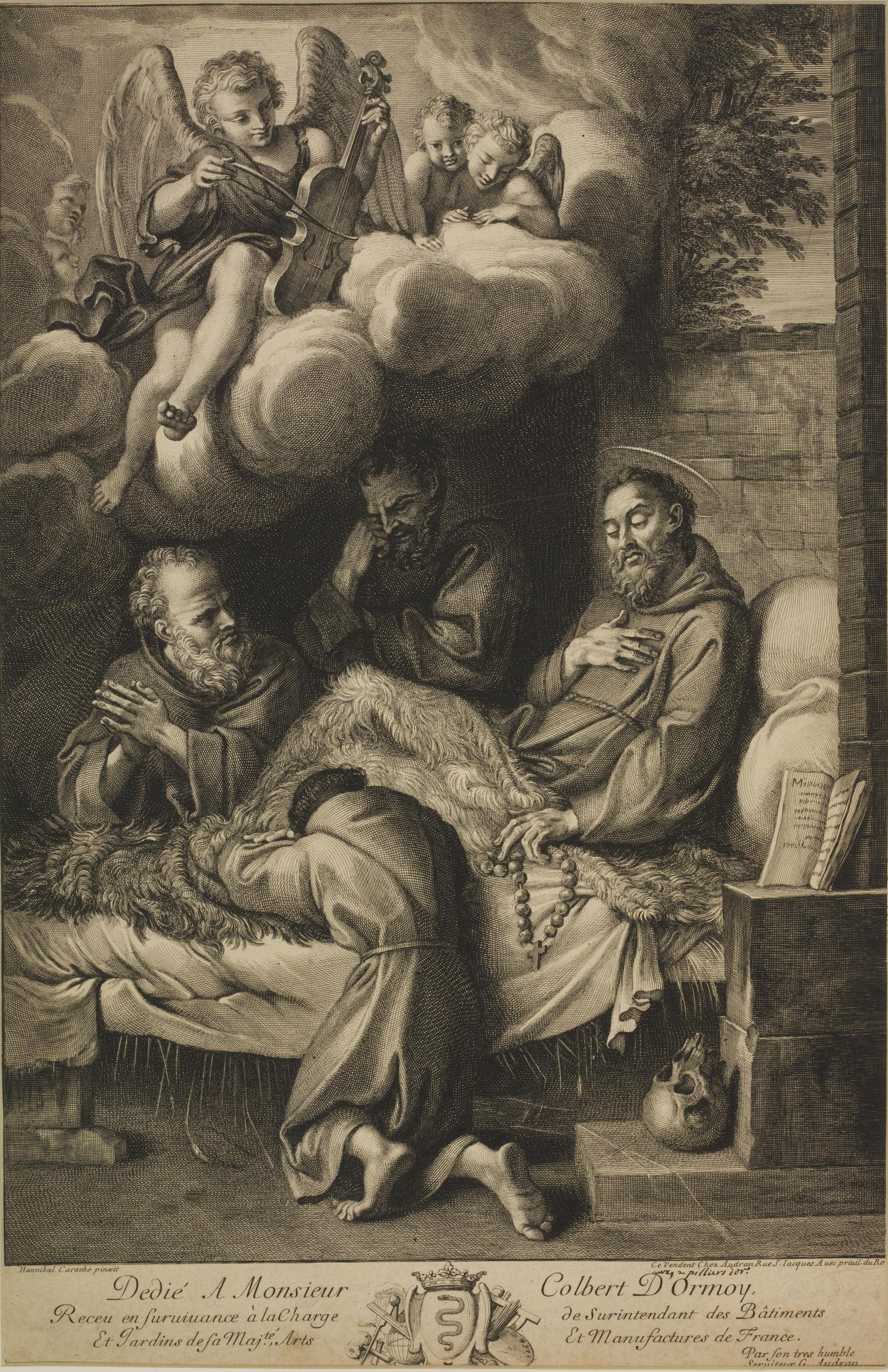
Gérard Audran, The Death of Saint Francis, 18th century, Victoria and Albert Museum

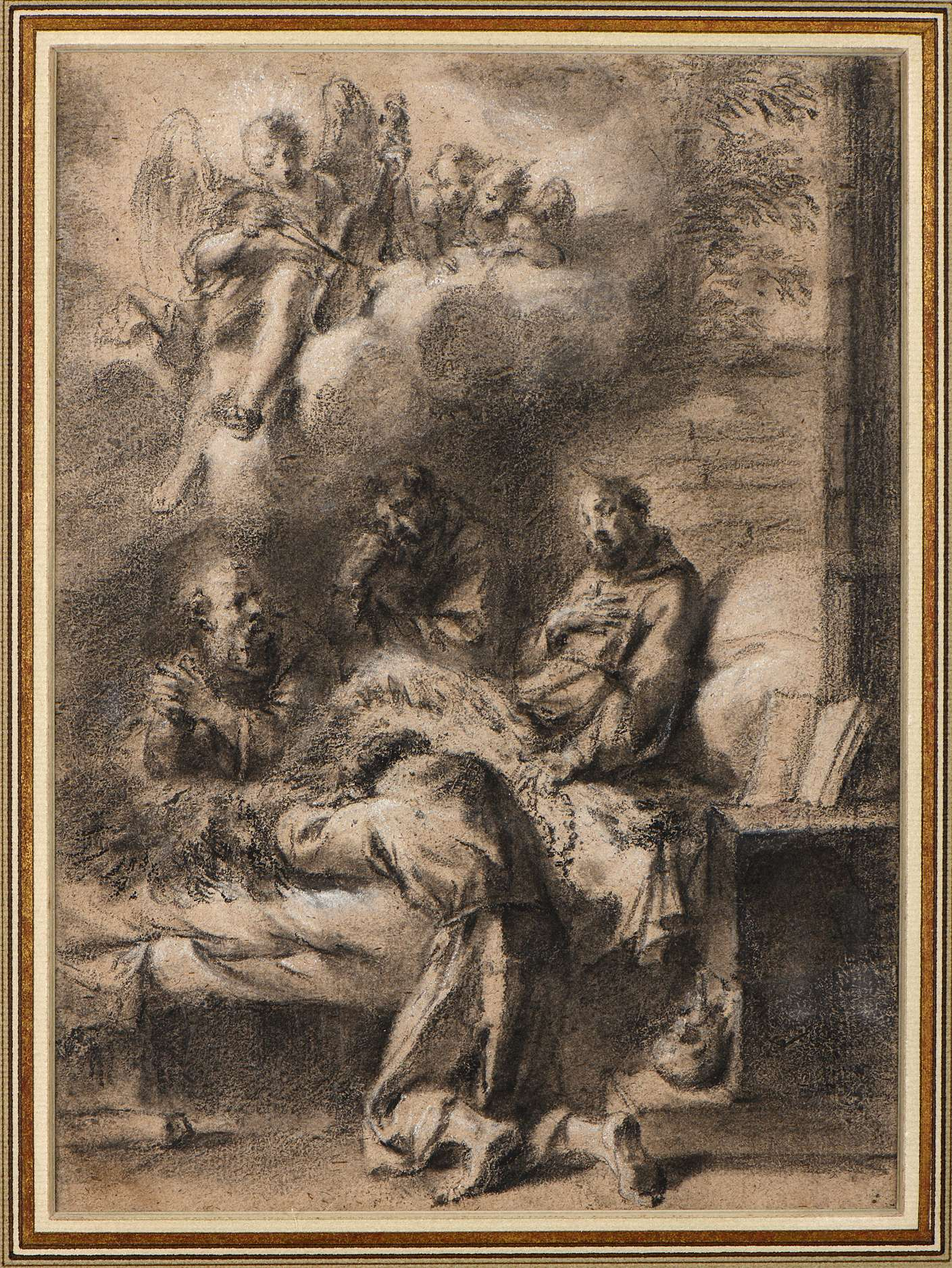
Aureliano Milani, The Death of Saint Francis, 17th century, private collection

== Second version ==
In his Felsina Pittrice (1678), Carlo Cesare Malvasia recorded "a most beautiful copperplate-painting [by Annibale Carracci] with a numb Saint Francis supported by an angel, with three cherubs in the air aiming at him" which he states was then in the Farnese collections at Palazzo del Giardino in Parma. That work was also mentioned in several 17th and 18th century inventories of the ducal collection in Parma.

Art historians have identified three painted copies after that work, now in Sheffield Galleries and Museums, the Gemäldegalerie Alte Meister, Dresden and the Christ Church Picture Gallery in Oxford. However, all three are oil on panel not on copper and so – assuming Malvasia is correct about the original work's support – none of them can be the original. The copies are high quality and have all been attributed to Annibale himself at some time in their lives - Oxford and Sheffield still catalogue their versions as autograph works by Annibale. However, art historical consensus is now that all three works are copies by major names in the Emilian school – Denis Mahon suggested Ludovico Carracci for the Sheffield work and Bartolomeo Schedoni and Sisto Badalocchio have been suggested for that in Dresden. Their quality and number both strongly suggest a particularly authoritative model for them probably painted by Annibale himself, now lost or unidentified.

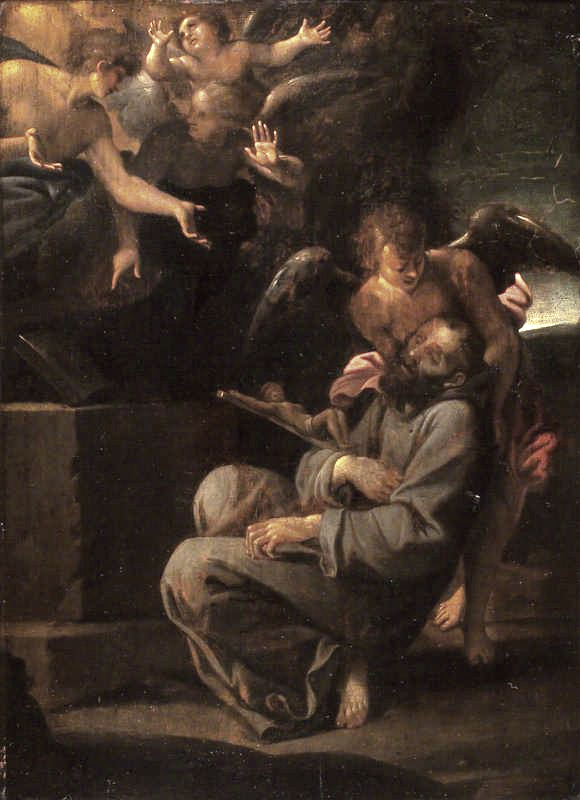
Christ Church Picture Gallery, Oxford

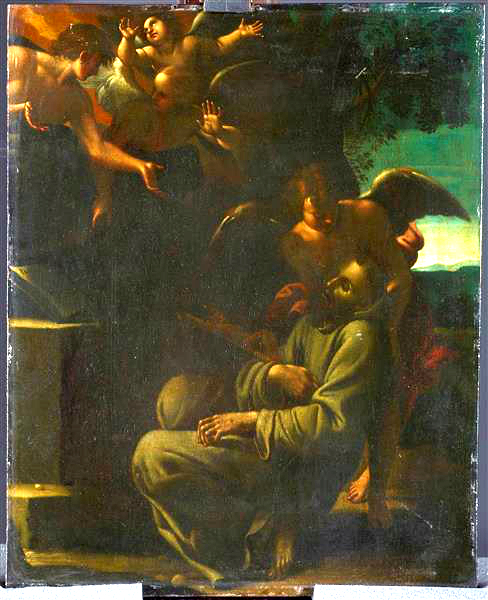
Gemäldegalerie Alte Meister, Dresden

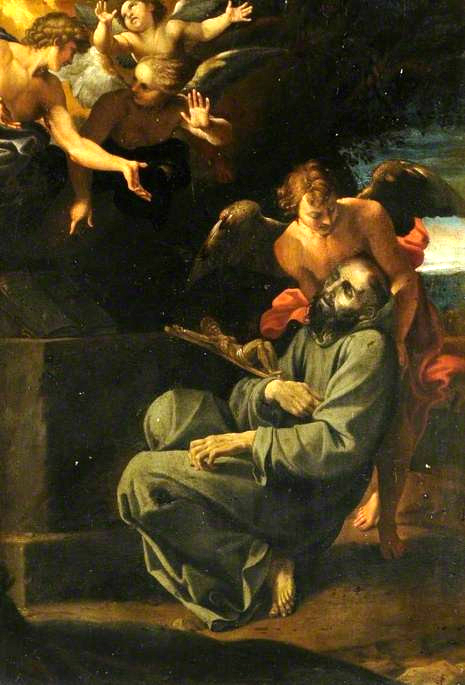
Sheffield Galleries and Museums Trust
