= Una Europa =

International network of European universities

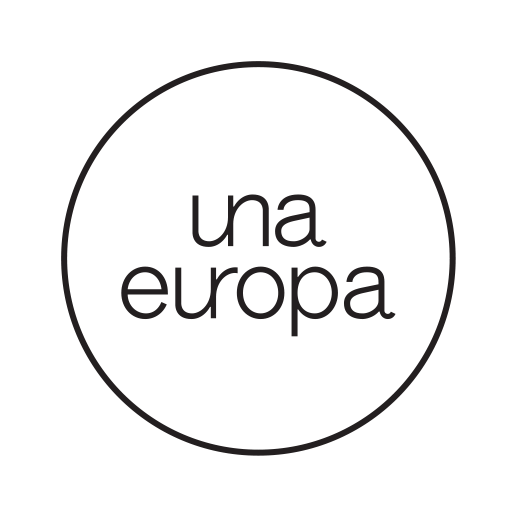
- Formation: 1 February 2019; 7 years ago
- Type: Education and research
- Headquarters: Brussels, Belgium
- Region served: Europe
- Secretary General: Sophia Karner
- Website: Una Europa

Una Europa is an international alliance of European research-intensive universities. Established in early 2019, the alliance is headquartered in Brussels, Belgium and connects eleven universities, nine of which are in the European Union. Taken together, the participating universities teach more than 500,000 students with around 90,000 staff.

The network was formed in response to the European Commission's European Universities Initiative launched in 2017, which aims to create several transnational alliances of universities across Europe. The proposal for Una Europa was selected by the European Commission for funding in its first call in June 2019, and became operational the same year. Some of Una Europa's initiatives have received additional funds from the European Union's Framework Programmes for Research and Technological Development intended to foster cooperation in the European Research Area.

The alliance's ultimate goal is an integrated multinational university that enables student and staff mobility between its member institutions. This involves the creation of shared professorships, transnational joint degrees, doctoral programs, and research projects. The cooperation focuses on six main areas: cultural heritage, data science and artificial intelligence, European studies, materials science and technology, public health, and sustainability.

== Joint European degree programs ==
=== Joint Bachelor in European Studies ===
Una Europa launched its first transnational joint degree in October 2022, the Joint Bachelor in European Studies (BAES), including more than 270 students from 35 countries in its first cohort. The degree is the first of its kind in Europe, and allows students to study at several universities in the alliance during the three-year program. Students begin the program at one of the four 'degree-awarding universities' (Leuven, Bologna, Madrid, Kraków) and, during their second and third years, go on mobility programs to one or two different universities, choosing from any of the start universities or the mobility partner universities (Dublin, Helsinki, Edinburgh, Paris, Zürich, Leiden). During their first year, students follow the 'Truncus Communis', which includes introductory courses to various disciplines, multidisciplinary courses on Europe, a methodology track, and language courses. During the second year, the study path continues with a major specialization in a different university. In their final year, students follow a minor specialization module that covers a different field of study than the major, and develop a bachelor's thesis. The offered major and minor specializations available include: Business & Economics; Politics & International Relations; European & International Law; Philosophy; History; Languages & Culture; Communication, Education, Gender, & Sociology. Upon completion, students receive a single diploma awarded collaboratively by all four degree-awarding partners.

In the 2025/26 academic year, more than 800 students from over 40 countries were enrolled across all three cohorts of the program. In September 2026, the newest cohort included 329 students across all starting universities. In October 2026, former Italian prime minister Enrico Letta held a speech at the graduation ceremony of the second BAES cohort in the Aula Magna di Santa Lucia of the University of Bologna.

Graduation Ceremonies
Cohort	Host University	Location	Guests
2024-2027	Jagiellonian University, Kraków	TBA	TBA
2023-2026	University of Bologna	Aula Magna di Santa Lucia	Enrico Letta
2022-2025	Complutense University of Madrid	Aula Magna of the Faculty of Law	Daniel Calleja y Crespo

=== Joint Bachelor in Sustainability ===
Following the introduction of its first transnational joint degree, Una Europa has developed its second joint program, the Joint Bachelor in Sustainability (BASUS). This undergraduate program is coordinated by six universities (Kraków, Leuven, Paris, Madrid, Zurich, Helsinki) of the alliance. As a joint degree, graduates receive a single diploma awarded collaboratively by all six institutions. The program has received accreditation through the European Approach procedure, granted by an international panel chaired by the Polish Accreditation Committee. It welcomed its first cohort in the 2025/26 academic year. During the first year, all students follow the Common Core curriculum in Kraków, the 'start university'. In the second year, students disperse across the partner universities to pursue one of six specialized Tracks, each focusing on a different disciplinary perspective on sustainability studies: Sustainable Chemistry & Physics; Economy & Geography; Law & Politics of Sustainability; Environmental & Life Sciences; Economics, Management & Engineering; Social Sciences & Humanities. The program culminates in the Final Semester, during which students write a bachelor’s thesis. In addition, students can apply to spend their final semester at any of the universities affiliated with the program, either at a degree-awarding partner university (Kraków, Leuven, Paris, Madrid, Zurich, Helsinki), or at a mobility partner university (Edinburgh, Berlin).

== Structure and governance ==
=== Member universities ===
New member universities are admitted by the alliance's General Assembly.

Institution	Country	Founded	Students	Staff	Accession
Complutense University of Madrid	Spain	1293	61,165	11,570	Founder
Free University of Berlin	Germany	1948	37,700	4,730	Founder
Jagiellonian University, Kraków	Poland	1364	36,000	8,700	Founder
KU Leuven	Belgium	1425	64,476	13,655	Founder
Paris 1 Panthéon-Sorbonne University	France	1971	45,000	2,700	Founder
University of Bologna	Italy	1088	97,235	6,881	Founder
University of Edinburgh	United Kingdom	1583	49,640	17,654	Founder
University of Helsinki	Finland	1640	31,871	8,796	4 October 2019
Leiden University	Netherlands	1575	33,839	6,413	13 January 2022
University College Dublin	Ireland	1854	32,413	4,271	9 May 2022
University of Zurich	Switzerland	1833	28,785	7,882	9 May 2022

=== Governing bodies ===
The General Assembly is the highest decision-making body of the alliance and is composed of the Rectors or Presidents of the member universities as well as university-related members. It is responsible for defining the long-term strategic vision, approving amendments to the statutes, and deciding on the admission of new member institutions.

The Board of Directors provides management oversight and is composed of the Vice-Rectors, typically responsible for international affairs, from each member university. It appoints its own president, as well as the secretary-general and treasurer of the alliance.

=== Strategic groups ===
The External Advisory Board is composed of international experts from academia, public policy, and industry who provide independent strategic advice. Its members are appointed by the General Assembly and meet at least once a year.

The Student Board consists of two students of each member university and ensures that the student voice is taken into account in decision-making. It convenes monthly in an online format and a few times a year in person.

=== Operational framework ===
The Secretary-General and their team is based in the alliance's Brussels office and responsible for day-to-day activities.

- Emily Palmer (2019–2025)
- Sophia Karner (2025–present)

== Partnerships ==
Una Europa maintains bilateral and multilateral collaborations with global partners, with an emphasis on long-term, strategic cooperation.

A key initiative is the Una Europa–Africa Partnership, which brings together eight African universities - University of Kinshasa (Democratic Republic of the Congo), University of Ghana (Ghana), University of Nairobi (Kenya), Eduardo Mondlane University (Mozambique), Kampala International University (Uganda), Makerere University (Uganda), University of Johannesburg (South Africa), and the University of the Witwatersrand (South Africa) - with the Una Europa alliance. Established in 2022, it is designed to build a transcontinental academic community focused on addressing global challenges. It places particular emphasis on supporting early-career researchers through structured collaboration in research, education, and societal outreach. Concrete initiatives include the Una Europa–Africa Seed Funding Call, which funds joint research projects between European and African institutions, and UnaVEx (Una Europa for Virtual Exchange), a program aimed at connecting 2,500 students across the two continents through virtual learning experiences focused on sustainability. The partnership also envisions mobility fellowships, academic training workshops, joint PhD supervision schemes, and online PhD masterclasses.

== See also ==
- List of higher education associations and alliances
