= Carlo Lodi =

Italian painter (1701–1765)

Carlo Lodi (11 February 1701 – 22 April 1765) was an Italian painter of the late-Baroque period in Bologna, mainly painting landscapes.

== Biography ==
He was born and initially trained with Angelo Michele Cavazzoni. Another pupil was Bernardo Minozzi. He then went to work for some months under the landscape artist, Nunzio Ferraiuoli. He married in 1730, but had no children.

In 1735, he collaborated in the decoration of the Palazzo Malvezzi Campeggi (now Law College Faculty Building) in Bologna with Antonio Rossi, who painted figures in landscape. The paintings depict the feats of the Malvezzi family. In the 1740s, he worked again with Rossi on the decoration of the Palazzo Pepoli/Villa Cicogna in San Lazzaro di Savena, with scenes depicting the Story of Moses, Story of Telemachus, Landscapes, and Events during Spanish Invasions.

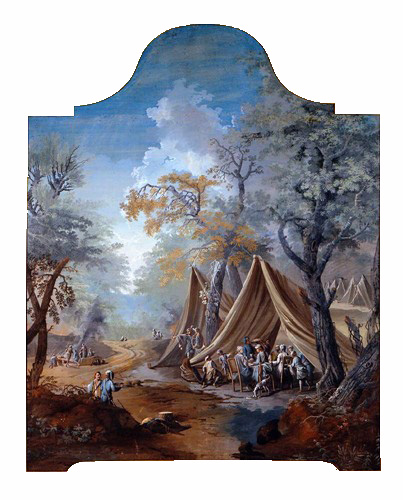
The Staff's Supper by Lodi and Antonio Rossi in Bologna

In 1753 he helped decorate the refectory of the Convent of San Giacomo in Bologna and Villa San Giovanni Comelli, near Bologna. Also, in the same year, Rossi's death ended their successful collaboration. In the future he collaborated with Nicola Bertucci, including for the Villa Ranuzzi-Cospi in Bagnarola, a frazione of Budrio, near Bologna.

His landscape paintings obtain buyers in Rome, including Cardinal Luigi Valenti Gonzaga. He was very active in fresco decoration, including in the Magani House, and in Casa Lambertini, Casa Guidalotti, Casa Scarani, Casa Bentivogli, Casa Graffi, Casa Varnini, Casa Tondelli, and Casa Boschi. He became a member of the Bolognese Accademia Clementina in 1747. He died in Bologna. One of Lodi's pupils was Vincenzo Martinelli.

== Bibliography ==
- Dizionario biografico degli italiani LXV, Roma, Istituto dell'Enciclopedia italiana, 2005
- Treccani enciclopedia entry.
