= Ferraioli =

Ferraioli is a surname. Notable people with the surname include:

- Erika Ferraioli (born 1986), Italian swimmer
- José Ferraioli (born 1948), Puerto Rican swimmer

== See also ==
- Nunzio Ferraiuoli (1661–1735), Italian Baroque painter
- Ferraiolo
