= Biblioteca Zambeccari, Bologna =

Coordinates: 44.48918°N 11.34741°E

The Biblioteca Zambeccari is a former library, attached to the Jesuit monastery and colleges near the church of Santa Lucia in Bologna. Now with two stories of shelves bereft of books, the Baroque frescoed room, located in the Liceo Galvani, is sometimes used for meetings and public events.

== History ==
Also known as the Libreria di Santa Lucia, the idea of a library for the burgeoning collection of books in the collections of the Jesuit institutions came to fruit in 1742 with the patronage of the Zambeccari-Sbaraglia family, which supported the construction of the site, and further acquisitions and maintenance. They employed the architect Giuseppe Antonio Ambrosi to design the space, which did not originally provide access to the street, despite aims of creating somewhat of a public library. Later access to the entrance stairs of the library was made from the portico on via Castiglione. The library room fills two floors and once held over 15,000 books. The second-floor balcony with a balustrade was accessed by a helical stair. The fresco decoration (completed in December 1744) was a collaboration of Nicola Bertuzzi and Giuseppe Marchesi (figure painters); Pietro Scandellari (quadratura); and Antonio Calegari (stucco decoration). The library was opened in 1752, but the Jesuit order itself was suppressed in 1773, and the property was ceded to the Barnabite order. With the Napoleonic occupation, many of the most precious manuscripts and codices were moved to other collections. Finally in 1869, after the closure of numerous religious institutions by the Italian government, the collections of this library and the Santa Lucia complex were added to the patrimony of the Archiginnasio Library. The Fascists moved the collections to via Manzoni, near the Casa del Fascio. The library room was used by a Music School for Violins, as a concert hall. In 1935, it became property of the Liceo “Galvani”.

The entrance staircase was frescoed by Bertuzzi with putti holding up various biblical quotes, upholding the Jesuit vision of knowledge infused by a Catholic spirit. For example, one, banner reads “in omni animo tuo accede ad illam” (Ecclesiasticus 6: 27). In the anteroom of the library is an allegory of knowledge with a cornucopia in his left arm. In the ceiling of the library is a fresco depicting Solomon.
