= Palazzo Caprara, Bologna =

Coordinates: 44°29′38.08″N 11°20′23.00″E

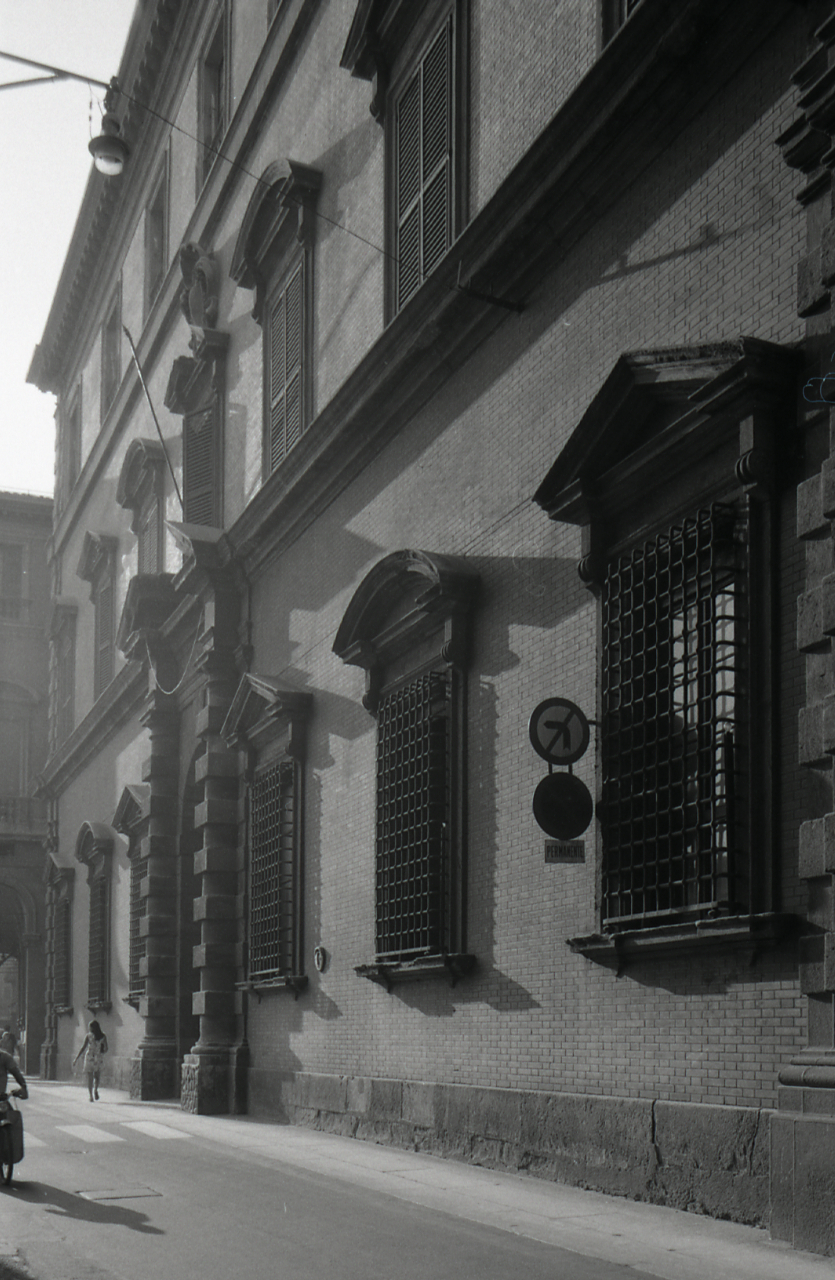
Palazzo Caprara. Photo by Paolo Monti (1971)

The Palazzo Caprara, also called Palazzo Galliera is a Renaissance-style urban palace located on Via IV Novembre #22 in central Bologna, region of Emilia-Romagna, Italy.

== History ==
The palace was commissioned by Girolamo Caprara, and tradition holds that the primary layout, completed in 1603, is due to the architect Francesco Terribilia. Later refurbishments in 1705 were by Giuseppe Antonio Torri and his pupil Alfonso Torreggiani. The grand entry staircase to the piano nobile is attributed to Antonio Laghi. The piano nobile has frescoes by Petronio and his son, Pietro Paltronieri (also called il Mirandolese), Vittoria Maria Bigari (1720 c.), and Bernardo Minozzi. In 1805, Napoleon stayed and later acquired the palace. At one time, one of the galleries had quadratura by Ercole Graziani. To the right of the palace was a small Chapel with artworks by Fortuzzi Speziali, Carlo Cignani, Giuseppe Marchesi, Vittorio Bigari, Angelo Pio and Antonio Pavona.
