= Antonio Rossi (painter) =

Italian painter (1700–1753)

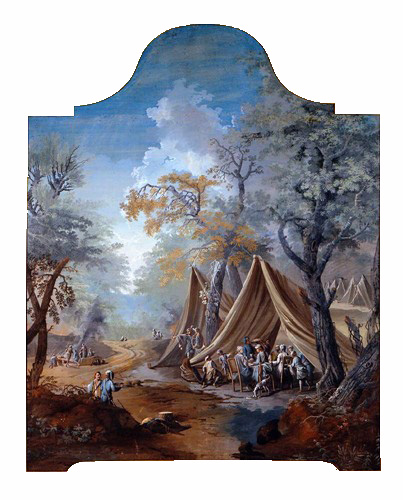
The Staff's Supper, by Carlo Lodi and Antonio Rossi.

Antonio Rossi (1700–1753) was an Italian painter of the late-Baroque or Rococo period, active mainly in Bologna, Papal States.

Born in Bologna, his father a merchant, obtained for his son a Jesuit education, and then training under Lorenzo Bergonzoni. Subsequently, along with Giuseppe Marchesi, he worked in the studio of Marcantonio Franceschini. He was a member of the Accademia Clementina.

Most of his works were on religious topics. He painted for the Basilica of San Domenico in Bologna. Among his works are:

- San Tommaso da Villanova(1723), now housed at hospital of Cento
- Martyrdom of St Bartholemew (1736) for Oratory della Concezione in Crevalcore
- Madonna e Santa Maria Maddalena dè Pazzi (1737) for the chiesa arcipretale of Medicina
- Portraits of Seven founding Saints (1740) for the church of San Lorenzo in Budrio
- Saints Augustine and Monica in ecstasy (1753-1755) for San Giacomo Maggiore in Bologna
- Madonna, St Michael, and St Blaise in ecstasy (1754) for Basilica of San Biagio, Cento
- St Peter and Paul before an allegory of Faith for the Cathedral of Anzola dell'Emilia
- Consecration of the Bishop by the Blessed Nicolò Albergati for the Cathedral of San Petronio, Bologna
- Crossing the Red Sea for Villa Boncompagni-Barbieri at Cicogna di San Lazzaro di Savena.
