= Giovanni Battista Ballanti =

Italian sculptor

Giovanni Battista Ballanti (1762–1835), also known as Giovan Battista Ballanti Graziani, was an Italian sculptor working in the Neo-classical style.

He was born in Faenza and his father, wishing him to become an engraver, placed him with a painter named Giuseppe Boschi (and commonly called Carlonini or Graziani). Later, Giovanni gained interest in sculpture.

Much of his work consists of statues of saints and religious subjects, working on churches and palazzi that were being built in Romagna.

In Forlì, his works are in Palazzo Manzoni ed in a Palace by Merenda (Palazzo del Merenda, in Italian).

In Faenza, he worked with Felice Giani on a number of buildings including the Palazzo Milzetti. He worked both in stone and plaster.
