= Antonio Peracchi =

Italian painter

Antonio Peracchi (1716 in Piacenza – 1802) was an Italian painter, active in the Neoclassic style.

He first studied under Ilario Spolverini, then in Bologna under Giuseppe Marchesi, who was called il Sansone. He painted the Santa Lucia e Sant'Orsola for the church of San Giorgio Sopramuro in Piacenza. He was much in demand for portraits. He was hired as an instructor of the Istituto Gazzola, when it opened in 1781. he also served as Academic of Honor for the Clementine Academy.
