= Filippo Pedrini =

Italian painter

Filippo Pedrini (Bologna, 1763 - Bologna, 1856) was an Italian painter.

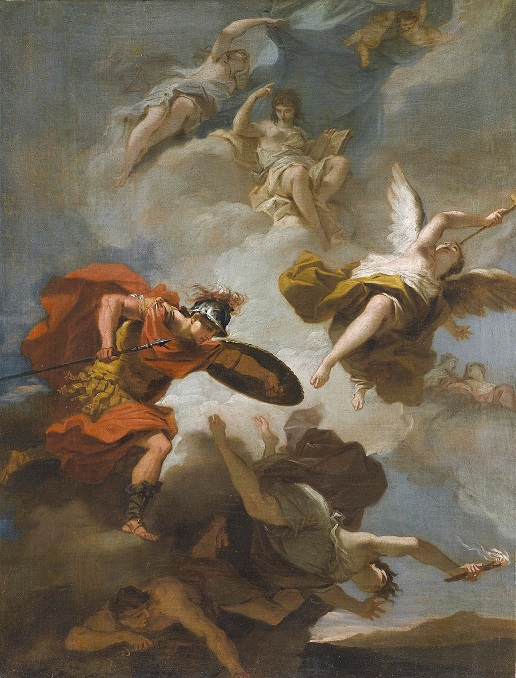
Filippo Pedrini's piece, Marte e la Fama

== Biography ==
He was the son of the painter Domenico Pedrini. At the Accademia Clementina in Bologna he became a pupil of Ubaldo and Gaetano Gandolfi, while Mauro Gandolfi and Felice Giani were fellow students.

His first paintings of Saints Barbara and Thomas Aquinas for San Bartolomeo in Bologna (both in situ) date from 1779, were probably completed in collaboration with his father. In 1790 he became a member of the Accademia Clementina, and in 1821 he was elected to the Accademia Pontificia in Rome.

He is best known for his frescoes for various palaces in Bologna, including paintings of Allegory of Victory and the Muses for the Palazzo Comunale, Bologna and a Apotheosis of Hercules (entry staircase ceiling), an Apollo and the Hours in the grand salon, and a Dance of Nymphs and Cupids for a room in the Palazzo Hercolani.

In 1828 he painted five canvases for the ceiling of San Paolo in Monte at Bologna, now in the convent there. In that year, he also painted Triumphant Religion Granting Immortality to Bologna (Felsina) on the ceiling of the Sala degli Uomini Illustri e Benemeriti of the Pantheon in the cemetery of the Certosa at Bologna. The design for the Pantheon was guided by Giuseppe Tubertini. Pedrini also painted various tombs in the Certosa, including those of Laghi, Carlo Chiesa e Vitale Bini, Ginevra Pepoli, Brigitta Giorgi Banti. In the Palazzo Tanari he was the figure painter for the landscape fresco artist Vincenzo Martinelli, and served a similar role in the Palazzo Pallavicini for Flaminio Minozzi.

In 1830 he completed the Delivery of the Keys for a church in San Pietro Capofiume near Bologna.

== Sources ==
- Oxford Grove Art:
- bibliography
