= Bernardo Minozzi =

Italian painter

Bernardo Minozzi (12 August 1699 – 5 March 1769) was an Italian painter, mainly of landscapes in a late Baroque style.

== Biography ==
He was born in Bologna. Minozzi, as well as Carlo Lodi, received their initial training with Angiol Michele Cavazzoni, but soon both were studying under Nunzio Ferrajoli at the Accademia del Nudo in Bologna. Minozzi's tempera and watercolor landscapes became much in demand by both Italian and English collectors. The art merchant Antonio Forni sold his designs to a Zaccaria Sagredo, from the aristocratic family of Venice. His British patrons included the Job Right, physician for James Stuart, the Old Pretender and a Sir Sean Graham. One of his merchants for the transactions was a Milord Swins or Sweeny or McSweeny in Venice.

In his travels, Minozzi also befriended Marc Antonio Chiarini and Monsu Chamant, architect to Grand Duke of Tuscany. Among his Italian patrons were the Marchese Guido Antonio Barbazza and Marchese Alessandro Pallavacini and Cardinal Pompeo Aldrovandi. In 1734, Minozzi moved to Florence and in 1735, joined Academy of Design in Florence. In 1737, he participated in their yearly displays at the cloister of the Annunziata. In 1739 went to Rome for two years painted for a Cardinal Rohan, likely met the landscape painter Paolo Anesi.

In 1741, he returned to Bologna, where he frescoed for the Palazzo Caprara; Palazzo Pubblico of Bologna; the apartments (1750) for the Marchese Cesare Rasponi; and for the Counts Sicinio and Cornelio Pepoli. In 1748, he was made professor at Accademia Clementina, and two years later served as director or principe. He died in Bologna in 1769.

His son Flaminio Innocenzo Minozzi (3 October 1735 – 1817) became a painter of quadratura. He won the Marsili-Aldrovandi prizes from the Accademia Clementina. Flaminio worked in Italy with Carlo Galli Bibiena. He later moved to work in Lisbon.
