= San Giorgio in Sopramuro, Piacenza =

Oratory in Piacenza, Italy

Coordinates: 45.05061°N 9.69527°E

San Giorgio in Sopramuro is a Baroque style, Roman Catholic oratory, located at via Sopramuro #61, in Piacenza, Region of Emilia Romagna, Italy. The church is also called San Giorgino to distinguish the temple from the church of San Giorgio in via Calzolai.

== History ==
This oratory was built in 1645 at the site of an earlier parish church, which had been dedicated to Santi Nazaro e Celso. The design was by Domenico Cervini, and the work was patronized by the Confraternity della Beata Vergine del Suffragio. The confraternity was composed mainly of Genoese merchants and money-traders. The main altarpiece depicts the Madonna del Suffragio and souls in Purgatory (1692) painted by Robert De Longe. Despite the plain brick exterior, the interior is highly decorated with quadratura by Francesco Natali. The canvas depicting Saints Lucia and Ursula was painted by Antonio Perachi.

To the right of the church is the Capella dell'Ossario, completed in the early 1700s. In the Sacristy, there is a Madonna del Suffragio frescoed by Sebastiano Galeotti. In 1697, Benedetto Cozzi erected the organ and choir next to the organ. The present organ was installed in 1882 by Bossi Urbani.
