= Gian Luca Pallavicini =

Genoese nobleman, field marshal and diplomat (1697-1773)

His Lordship Gian Luca Pallavicini
- Born: Gianluca Pallavicini-Centurioni; 23 September 1697; Genoa, Republic of Genoa
- Died: 27 September 1773 (aged 76); Bologna, Papal States
- Burial place: Certosa di Bologna
- Education: Accademia Reale di Torino
- Family: Pallavicini family
- Honours: Order of the Golden Fleece

Governor of the Duchy of Milan
- In office 9 March 1745 – 25 August 1746
- Monarch: Maria Theresa
- Preceded by: Johann Georg Christian, Prince of Lobkowicz
- Succeeded by: Ferdinand Bonaventura II von Harrach

Governor of the Duchy of Milan
- In office 26 September 1750 – 22 September 1753
- Monarch: Maria Theresa
- Preceded by: Ferdinand Bonaventura II von Harrach
- Succeeded by: Francesco III d'Este

Gian Luca Pallavicini (or Pallavicino; Genoa, 23 September 1697 – Bologna, 27 September 1773) was a Genoese nobleman, field marshal and diplomat in the service of the Habsburgs as Governor of Milan.

== Biography ==
Gian Luca Pallavicini was a member of the noble Genoese Pallavicini family that had held high positions in the Republic of Genoa since the 12th century and had risen to the position of Doge three times.

Having undertaken a military and diplomatic career, between 1731 and 1733 he was ambassador of the Republic of Genoa in Vienna. In 1733, he entered in the service of the Emperor and in the summer of 1733 he managed to obtain the sending of a small fleet to Trieste, to support the Imperial army, which was then engaged in combat against France, Sardinia and Spain in the War of the Polish Succession. He also assumed command and became the first commander in chief of the Imperial fleet on 7 August 1733.

In 1734 he led the viceroyal fleet of the Kingdom of Naples against the Spanish. In late spring 1735, he led an Austrian river flotilla on the Po, near Revere, not far from Mantua. Under his auspices a naval construction plan was prepared, but only partially realized. In 1735 he received the title of General of the galleys and the rest of the Navy.

Later, he was appointed commander of the Danube river flotilla, with which he fought against the Ottomans. In 1741 he was promoted to Lieutenant Field Marshal. During the War of the Austrian Succession he directed the siege of Mirandola in 1742 and the following year he fought in the Battle of Campo Santo. Having entered the Austrian diplomatic circles, on 22 December 1744 he was appointed Minister Delegate for Lombardy under the government of Maria Theresa of Austria, and from 9 March 1745 he was appointed Governor of the Duchy of Milan and General Commander of the Austrian troops in Milan, taking possession of his Milanese headquarters from 16 June of that year. It was during this period that he appointed Luigi Giusti as his secretary.

This appointment was necessary, because on 16 December of that same 1745, Philip of Bourbon and his Spanish army had entered Milan, proclaiming himself King of Lombardy. Governor Pallavicini was forced to take refuge in the fortress of Mantua, from where Maria Theresa gave him instructions for the creation of a new emergency government until order was restored in the Lombard capital. Pallavicini was able to return to Milan only on 25 August 1746 after victory in the Battle of Rottofreddo.

After these actions, the government decided to place a more forceful man in charge of such a delicate area as Milan, and the choice therefore fell on Ferdinand Bonaventura II von Harrach, who remained in office until 1750, the year in which Giovanni Luca Pallavicini was recalled to his post.

Already in 1749, in an attempt to gain popularity with the Milanese population, he organized several public activities, including open-air concerts in the area of the Castello Sforzesco, availing himself of the collaboration of the Milanese musician and composer Giovanni Battista Sammartini. With this renewed confidence, Giovanni Luca Pallavicini was re-appointed Governor of Milan on 26 September 1750. He continued to amaze the Milanese with other spectacular ideas, such as the one on 6 October 1750 when, on the occasion of the celebrations for his election, he brought a live rhinoceros for the first time to Milan and displayed it for the enjoyment of the population in the Piazza Mercanti.

During his reign of 3 years, he succeeded in reducing the members of the Senate, the Secret Chancellery and the Fiscal College, and also in concentrating in one single magistracy, the competences previously carried out by the two revenue magistrates, accompanied by a consequent reduction in staff. He also obtained the approval of the Sovereign to establish ons single general board for all public contracts, and a council to study how to reduce the debts of the state and of the city of Milan.

On 22 September 1753, Giovanni Luca Pallavicini left his post in Milan and returned to the court of Vienna, and was succeeded by Archduke Peter Leopold.

In 1754 he received the appointment of Field Marshal and Knight of the Golden Fleece which would be conferred on him by the Duke of Modena. Further recognition for the services rendered came from the assignment in 1755 of a pension of 5,000 florins per year.

He moved to Bologna, where he purchased a palace from Senator Ferdinando Bolognetti in 1765, now known as the Palazzo Pallavicini. The fourteen year-old Wolfgang Amadeus Mozart performed in his palace in 1770 and met renowned masters of European music, like Josef Mysliveček, Johann Baptist Wanhal, Farinelli, Charles Burney and in particular his mentor Padre Martini. Pallavicini wrote several letters of recommendation ahead of Mozart's Italian tour. He died in Bologna on 27 September 1773 and was buried in the Certosa of Bologna, where a monument by Giovanni Duprè recalls his presence in the city.

== Marriage and children ==
Pallavicini married twice:

- In 1720 with Anna Maria Pallavicino (1698–1751), daughter of the Genoese patrician Domenico Pallavicino and Maddalena Spinola, previously divorced from Gian Giacomo Imperiali;
- In 1753 with Maria Caterina Fava Ghislieri (1714–1786) from Bologna, daughter of Count Pietro Ercole Fava Ghislieri and Porzia Sega, widow of the Bolognese senator Count Camillo Boccadiferro. They had one son:
  - Giuseppe Maria Pallavicino (1756–1818), Marquis of the Holy Roman Empire, Order of the Golden Fleece (1792).
