= Palazzo Cospi Ferretti =

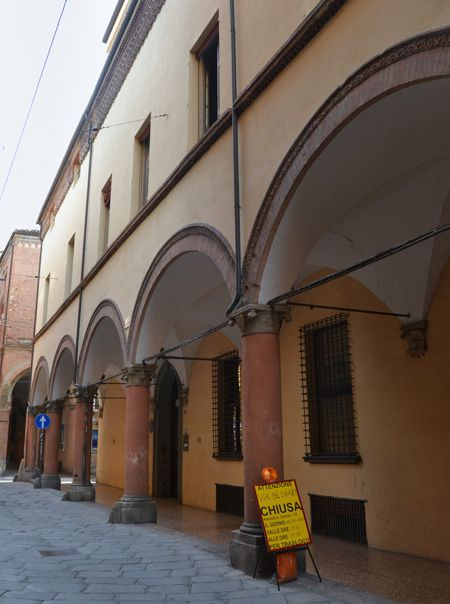
- Interactive map of the Palazzo Cospi Ferretti area

General information
- Type: palace
- Architectural style: Renaissance
- Location: Bologna, Italy, Via Castiglione #21
- Coordinates: 44°29′26″N 11°20′47″E

The Palazzo Cospi Ferretti is a Renaissance style palace located on Via Castiglione #21 in central Bologna, region of Emilia-Romagna, Italy.

== History ==
This building was commissioned by the Sampieri family in the 15th century. The facade has terracotta decorations. In 1614 the palace was acquired by the Cospi, who commissioned fresco decoration (circa 1670) of the piano nobile by Angelo Michele Colonna and Giacomo Alboresi. Other fresco decoration provided by Domenico Pedrini and Francesco Stagni.
