= Girolamo Mattioli =

Italian painter

Girolamo Mattioli (lived 1577) was an Italian painter and engraver of the late Baroque period, active in Bologna.

He was a pupil of Lorenzo Sabbatini, who also became a follower of the Carracci. His works were distributed among different patrons, particularly in the noble family of Zani.
