= Felice Giani =

Italian painter

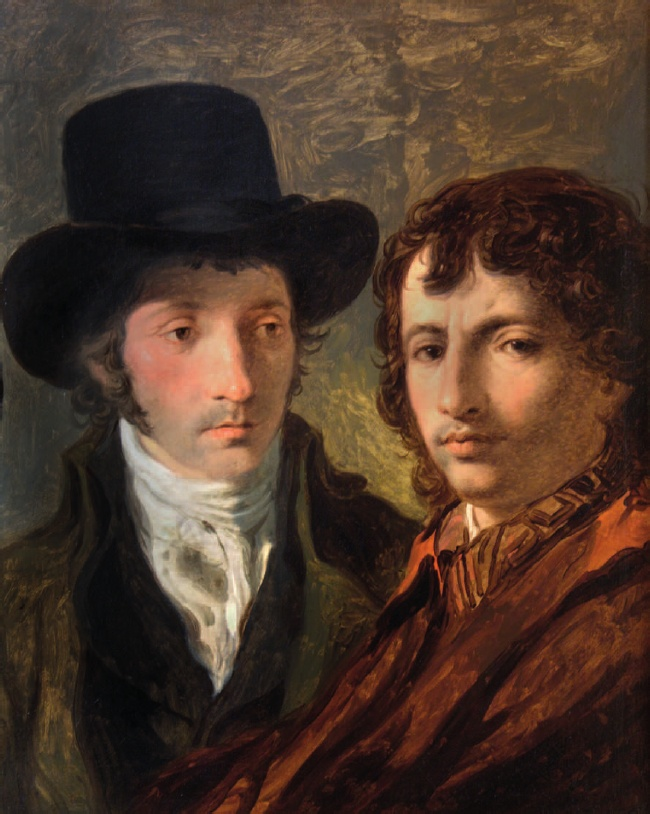
- Self-portrait with Michael Köck, c. 1800
- Born: 17 October 1758; San Sebastiano Curone, Republic of Genoa
- Died: 10 January 1823 (aged 64); Rome, Papal States
- Education: Accademia di San Luca
- Known for: Mythological and religious painting
- Movement: Neoclassicism

Felice Giani (17 December 1758 – 10 January 1823) was an Italian painter of the Neoclassic style. His grand manner subjects often included Greco-Roman allusions or themes.

== Biography ==
=== Early life and education ===
Felice Giani was born in San Sebastiano Curone near Alessandria, a fiefdom of Prince Andrea Doria Pamphili, who became his patron upon his arrival in Rome. Giani's career began with an apprenticeship in Pavia with the painter, Carlo Antonio Bianchi and the architect, Antonio Galli Bibiena. This training must have encouraged him to go in for architectural decoration.

Sponsored by the patronage of marchese Luigi Botta, he continued studies at Bologna (1778–79), under Ubaldo Gandolfi and Domenico Pedrini. He attended the Accademia Clementina, where he won a prize, and in 1780 he moved to Rome, where he studied at the Accademia di San Luca until 1783. In 1784, he won second prize in the painting competition of the Academy of Parma with Samson and Delilah.

=== Early career ===
In Rome, Giani found work in the decoration of the Palazzo Altieri. Between 1780 and 1786, he worked in various studios in Rome, under, for example, Pompeo Batoni and Christoph Unterberger. With Unterberger he worked on the paintings derived from Raphael's Logge and sent to Saint Petersburg in 1788 for Catherine the Great.

In 1786, Giani moved to Faenza, where he worked with the quadratura painter Serafino Barozzi, and with Giovanni Battista Ballanti. In Faenza, he was involved in a prolific series of projects, including the fresco decoration of the Laderchi, Naldi and Milzetti Palaces. The latter is generally considered his masterpiece. In Bologna, he decorated the Palazzi Aldini, Marescalchi, Lambertini Ranuzzi, and Baciocchi. In Rome, he worked in the palace of the Embassy of Spain, Palazzo Quirinale, and he also did work in Forlì, Ferrara, Ravenna and Venice.

=== Mature work ===
Giani made a great name for himself as an interior decorator, not only in Italy but also abroad. After 1794, he set up his own studio with four paid assistants who worked from his precise instructions, as witnessed in his enormous corpus of drawings. After the occupation of Italy by the French, he befriended several Napoleonic leaders, and travelled to Paris where he painted frescos in the villa of the Secretary of State of the Kingdom of Italy, Antonio Aldini. It is there, where he is credited with co-establishing the French Empire style.

He returned to Faenza in 1796 -1797 as a collaborator of Serafino Lodovico Barozzi and helped in the decoration of the Galleria dei Cento Pacifici. He helped establish the first Scuola Pubblica di Disegno, opened in 1796 under Giuseppe Zauli. In Faenza, Giani created a studio which had as pupils Gaetano Bertolani, Antonio Trentanove, the brothers Ballanti Graziani, and Marcantonio Trifogli.

In 1811, he joined the Accademia di San Luca and in 1819, the Congregation of the Virtuosi of the Pantheon. He died after falling from his horse in Rome in 1823, and he is buried in the church of Sant'Andrea delle Fratte.

== Legacy ==
His work is held in the collection of the Cooper-Hewitt, National Design Museum.

== Gallery ==
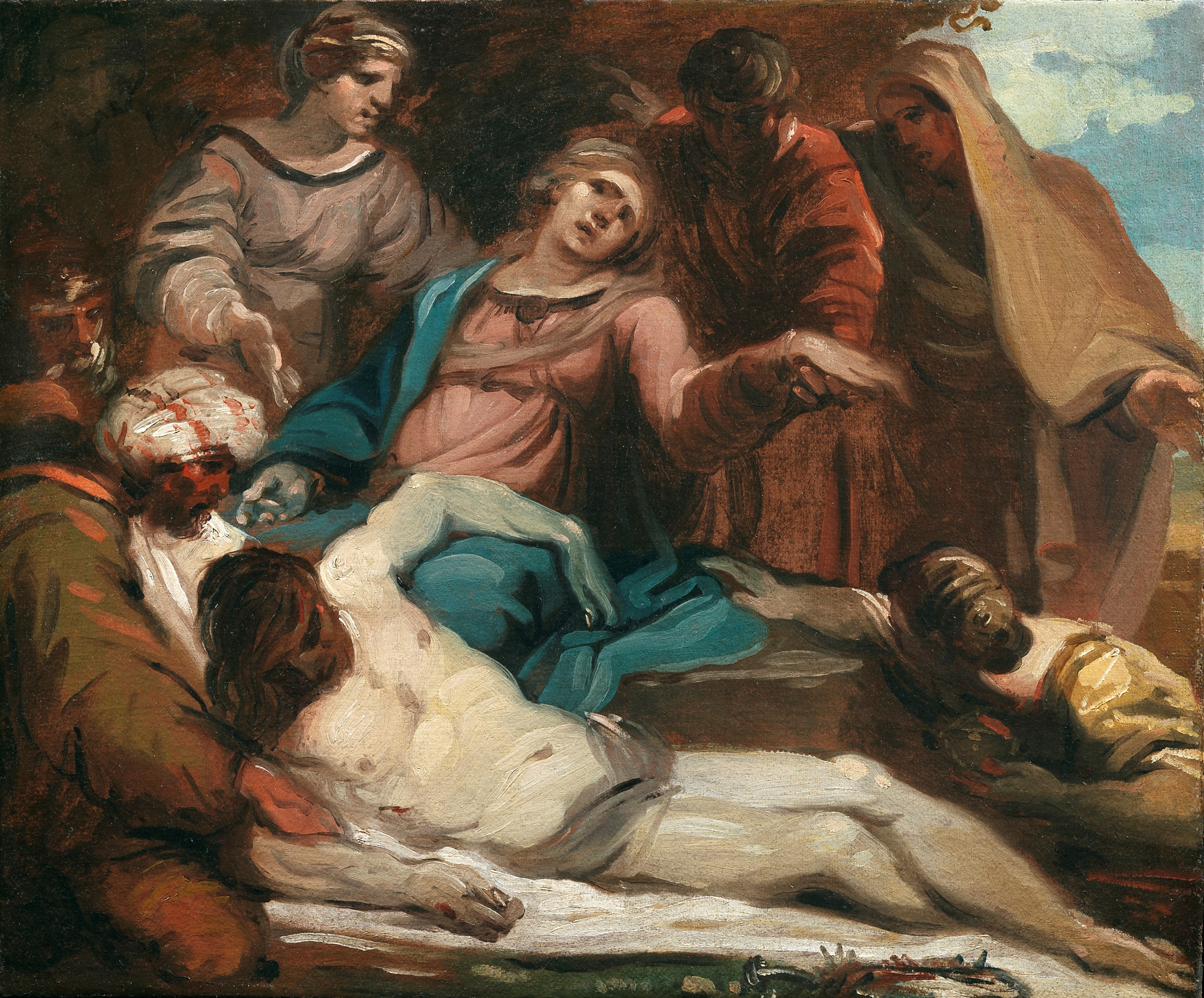
Lamentation over the dead Christ, oil on canvas, priv. col.

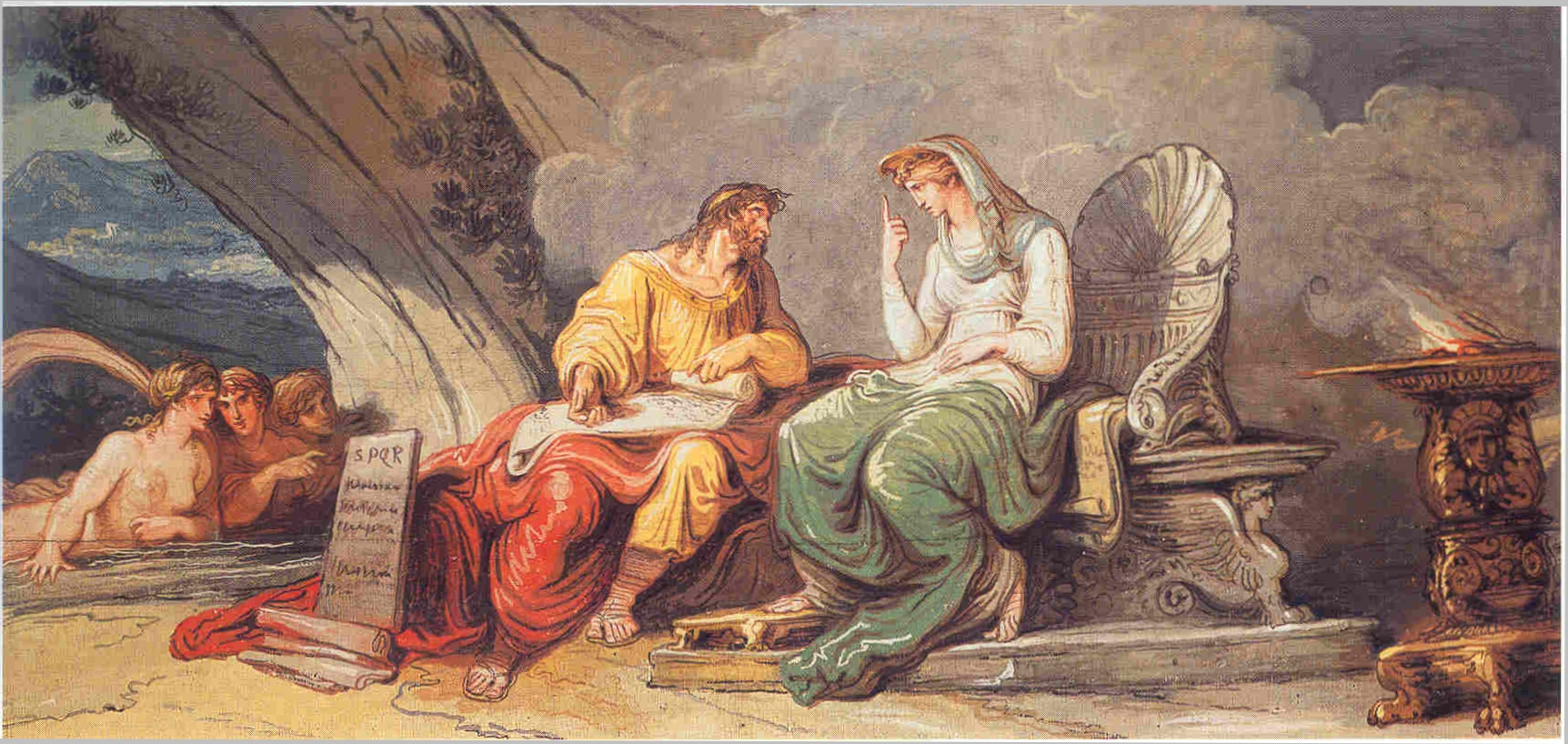
Numa Pompilius receives the laws of Rome from the nymph Egeria, Palazzo di Spagna, Rome

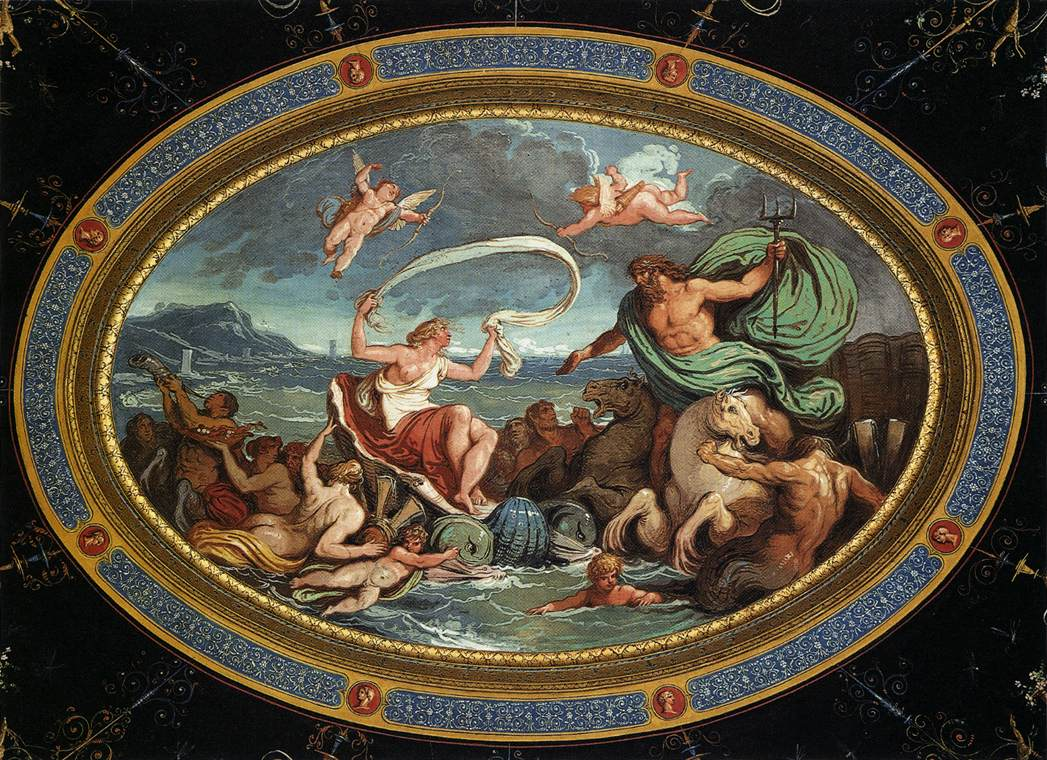
The Marriage of Poseidon and Amphitrite, Palazzo Milzetti, tempera mural, Faenza

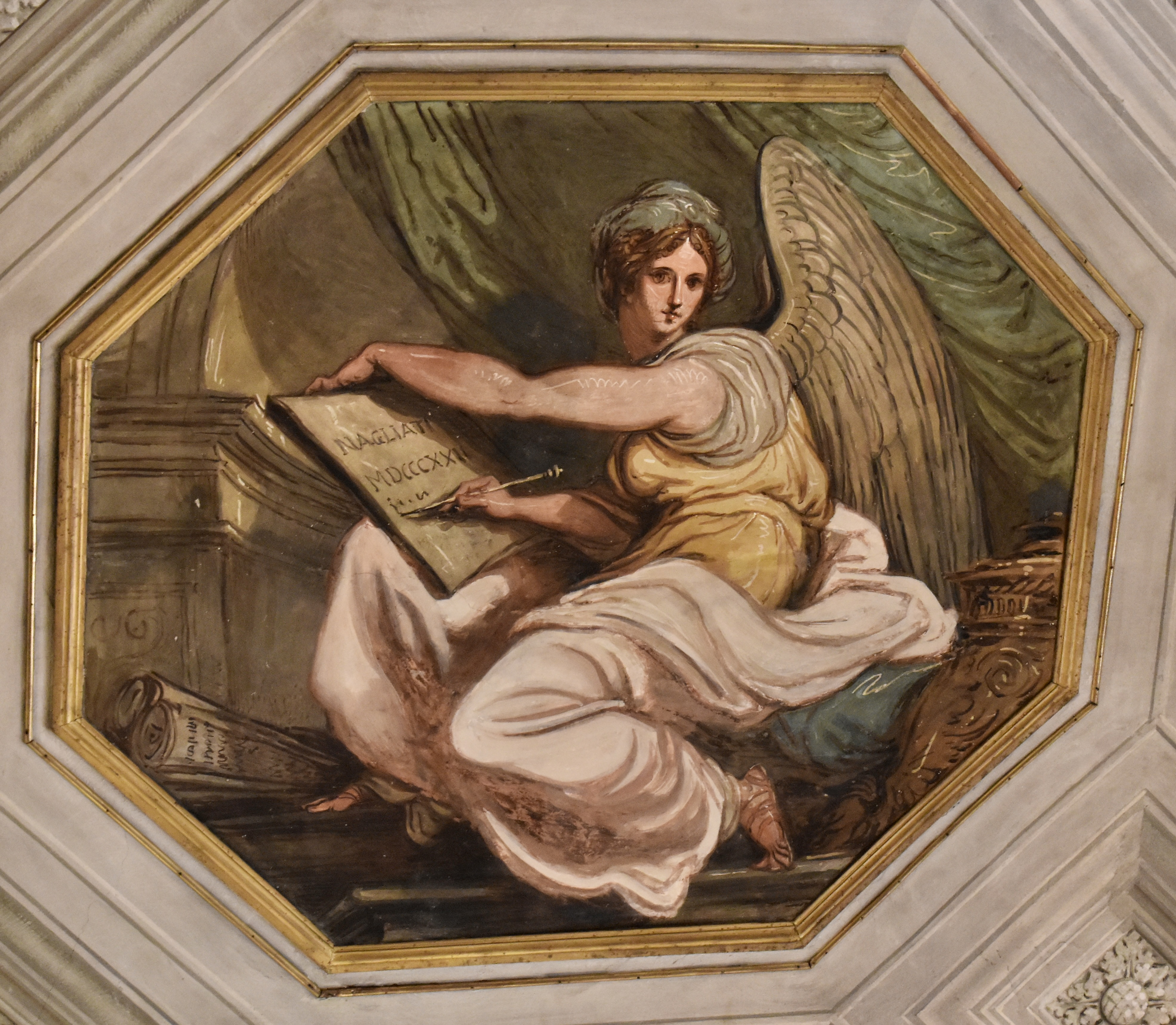
Allegory of Poetry, Palazzo Nagliati Braghini Rossetti, Ferrara

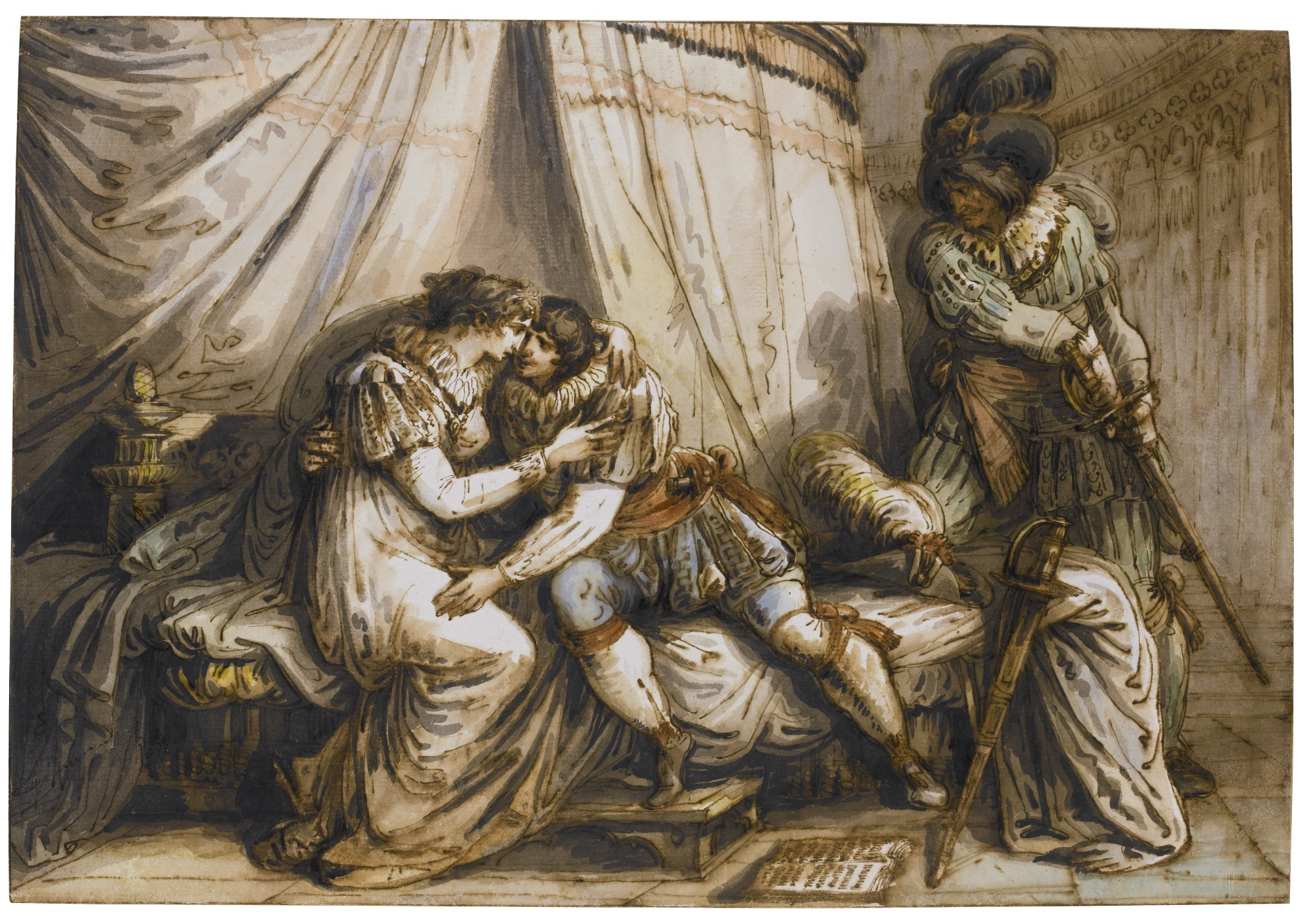
Paolo and Francesca surprised by Gianciotto Malatesta, pen, brown ink and watercolor, Staatliche Graphische Sammlung München, Munich

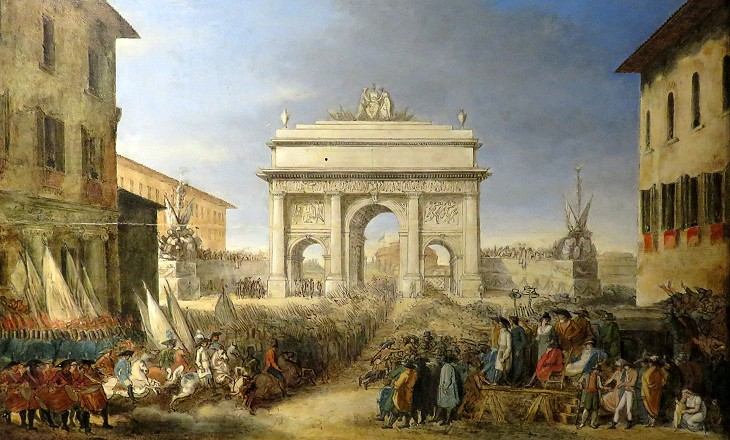
Ephemeral arch erected in Piazza di Ponte to celebrate the Roman Republic, Palazzo Braschi, Rome

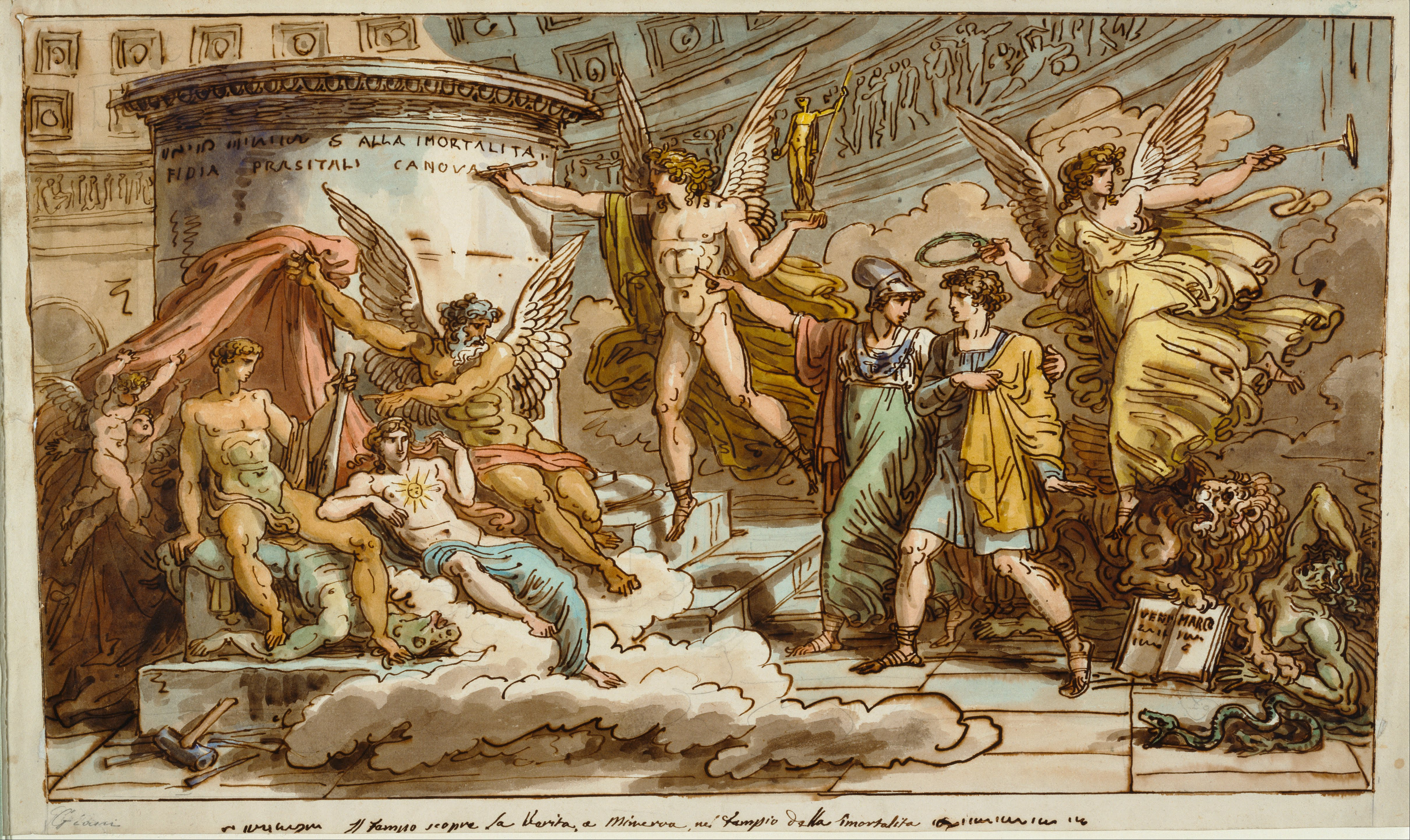
Allegory on the Life of Canova, black chalk, brown ink, and watercolor, Getty Center, Los Angeles

== Bibliography ==
- Massar, Phyllis Dearborn. "Giani, Felice", Grove Art Online, Oxford University Press (accessed 24 May 2025), Grove Art Online (subscription access).
- Theodore A. Gantz (1974). Felice Giani: (1758-1823) a Reassessment of His Decorative Style as Found in an Unpublished Sketchbook (M. A. dissertation ed.). Cincinnati.
- Massar, Phyllis Dearborn (1976). "Felice Giani Drawings at the Cooper-Hewitt Museum". Master Drawings. 14 (4): 396–466. JSTOR 1553392.
- Stefano Acquaviva; Marcella Vitali (1979). Felice Giani: un maestro nella civiltà figurativa faentina (in Italian). Faenza: Fratelli Lega Editori.
- Rozman, Ksenija (1980). "The Roman Views of Felice Giani and Francesco Caucig". Master Drawings. 18 (3): 253–321. JSTOR 1553560.
- Anna Ottani Cavina (1999). Felice Giani 1758-1823 e la cultura di fine secolo (in Italian). Vol. 2 vols. Milano: Electa. ISBN 978-88-435-5390-7.
- Marcella Vitali (2003). Felice Giani: dipinti e disegni da collezioni private (in Italian). Faenza: Edit Faenza.
- Tolomelli, Davide (2006). "Felice Giani e Il Marchese Luigi Botta Adorno. Documenti Sull'attività Giovanile Del Pittore Tra Pavia, Bologna e Roma". Arte Lombarda. 146/148 (1–3): 259–66. JSTOR 43133234.
