= Domenico Pedrini =

Italian painter (1728–1800)

Domenico Pedrini (1728 –1800) was an Italian painter. Fiercely provincial in his geographic activity, Pedrini's works were mainly completed in and around his native Bologna, and yet his atavistic style strayed far afield into Bologna's strong Baroque ancestry.

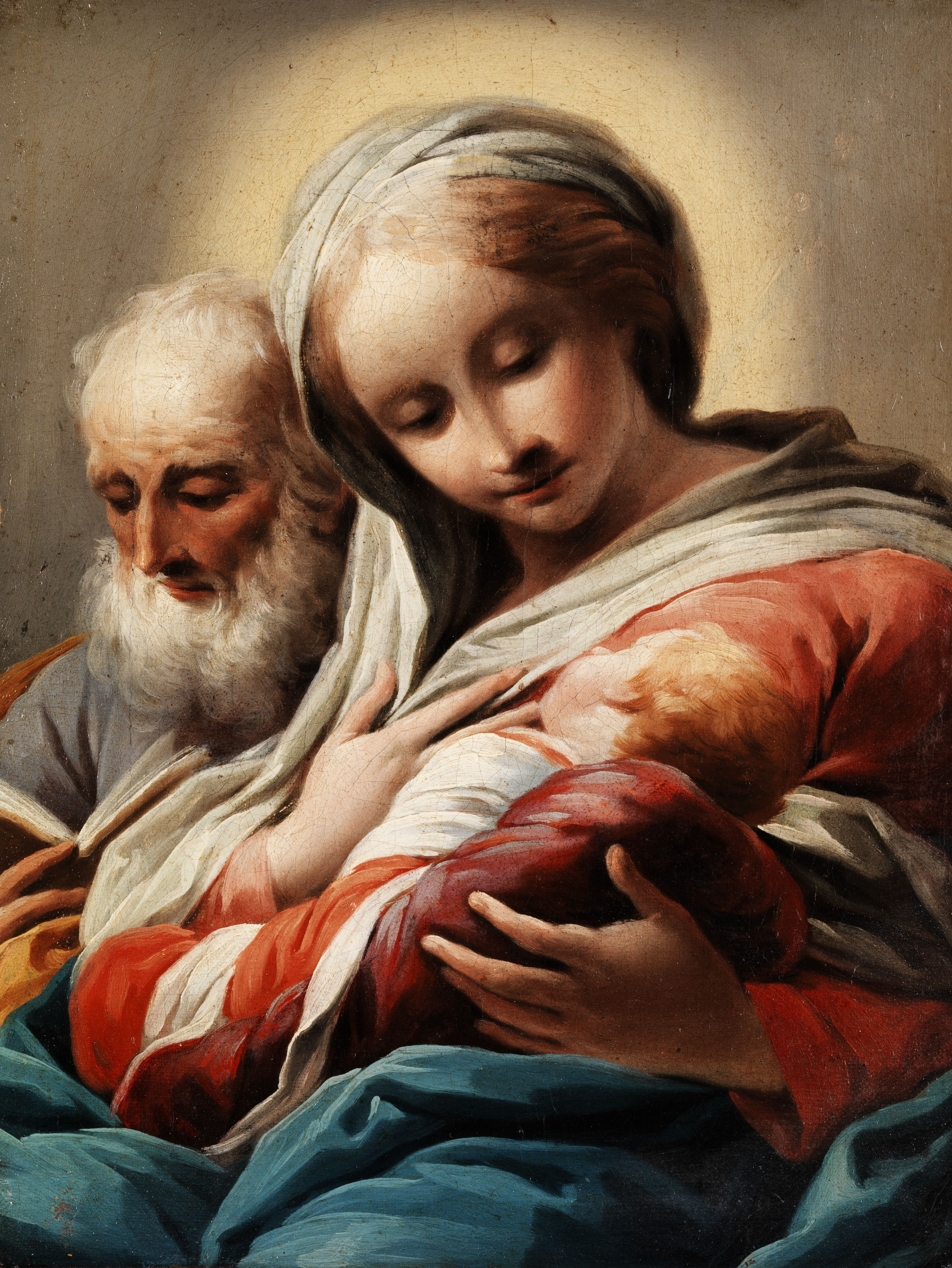
Virgin, child, and St Joseph, attributed to Pedrini

== Biography ==
He mainly painted for Bolognese churches including the church of San Bartolomeo (Madonna Addolorata), the Sanctuary of Santa Maria della Vita (St Joseph with the Christ Child), and the church of San Sigismondo (St Sigismund of Burgundy Adoring the Sacred Heart, main altarpiece). In the 1770s, he painted the altarpiece depicting Virgin and Child with St Cajetan for the church of Santa Maria delle Grazie alla Cavalleria in Bologna. Various quadrature and ornamental frescoes were completed in the Bolognese palaces of Cospi Ferretti, Fava-Simonetti and Tanari. Pedrini's allegorical ceiling paintings in the Palazzo Malvezzo, were likely to have been executed under the direction of Ubaldo Gandolfi. His son Filippo Pedrini was also a painter, who trained and worked with him and became a professor at the Accademia Clementina. Felice Giani was one of his pupils.

At the Palazzo Spalletti-Trivelli in Reggio Emilia, there are three works by Pedrini, St Sebastian, Blessing of Jacob, and Expulsion of Hagar. There is a San Francesco di Sales e San Francesco di Paola at the Sanctuary of Santa Maria delle Grazie in Pavia.

Pedrini died in 1800 in Bologna.
