= Nunzio Ferraiuoli =

Italian painter (1661–1735)

Nunzio Ferraiuoli (1661–1735) was an Italian painter of the Baroque period, mainly of landscapes.

Born in Nocera de' Pagani (presumably Nocera Inferiore), near Naples, he was a pupil of the painter Luca Giordano and although later in life traveled to Bologna, and worked with Giovanni Gioseffo dal Sole. He also painted landscapes in the style of Claude Lorrain. He collaborated with Francesco Monti. Among his pupils were Bernardo Minozzi and Carlo Lodi.
