= Giuseppe Marchesi =

Italian painter

- Virgin Adoring the Infant Christ, c. 1730, Glasgow Museums Resource Centre
- Born: 19 July 1699; Bologna, Papal States
- Died: 16 February 1771 (aged 71); Bologna, Papal States
- Other name: Il Sansone
- Education: Aureliano Milani; Marcantonio Franceschini
- Occupation: Painter
- Movement: Bolognese school

Giuseppe Marchesi (19 July 1699 – 16 February 1771) was an Italian painter of the Baroque period, active mainly in Bologna. He was also known as il Sansone for his herculean build.

== Biography ==
Giuseppe Marchesi first trained under the Bolognese painter Aureliano Milani, until Milani left Bologna for Rome in 1719. Marchesi then joined the workshop of Marcantonio Franceschini, an early and masterful exponent of the classicist style in Italy, at least until the affirmation of Donato Creti. From Milani, Marchesi had gained his first teacher's appetite for athletic male figures, in the style of the Carracci; while from Franceschini, Marchesi acquired a wonderful lightness in representing images of women, children and angels, and he always maintained the skill that Franceschini showed to render clear complexions suffused with gentle redness and harmony in composition. We do not know of works completed while he was a pupil of Franceschini who, being of a particularly sober nature, ended up driving the young Marchesi from his atelier because of the excessive vivacity of the latter's character.

Marchesi's first reliably dated work, The Rape of Elena (1725) was completed for the great hall of the Buratti house in Bologna, after the expulsion of Marchesi from Franceschini's workshop. Perhaps his canvases depicting the Four Seasons (National Art Gallery of Bologna) predate this work. These paintings depict nature in an arcadian spirit, but with a greater chromatic range than Franceschini, recalling works of Lorenzo Pasinelli. For example, he displays a more refined naturalism in the "Nocturnal Winter", in which Marchesi experiments with realistic and unusual effects of light and shadows, that demonstrate, as do the other three works, a knowledge of Northern European Rococo painting. However, already The Rape of Elena documents the start of the passage of Marchesi to what will be the second and central phase of his activity, in which, fascinated by the style of Vittorio Maria Bigari (1692–1776), he will employ translucent colors, with slender figures, crystalline skies and seas, and backgrounds of classic vertex architectures.

To this phase belong Achilles takes leave of the Centaur Chiron (Hinton Ampner, Hampshire) and Clement VIII returns the keys of the city of Bologna to the Elders (1739–1740), of the Civic Collections of Ancient Art of Bologna.

In the third and last period, Marchesi, while remaining an excellent performer, lost the compositional lightness that had characterized his youth and mature age, apparently as a result of depression caused by the declining health of his wife. He died in 1771 in Bologna.

The Beccadelli House in Bologna has some ground-floor rooms decorated by Vittorio Bigari and Marchesi. The Zambeccari Library, formerly of the Jesuit order, was decorated by Nicola Bertuzzi and Marchesi as figure painters, Pietro Scandellari in quadratura and Antonio Calegari as stuccoist. Among his pupils was Antonio Peracchi.

== Gallery ==
Madonna with Child, c. 1730, Pinacoteca Nazionale di Bologna

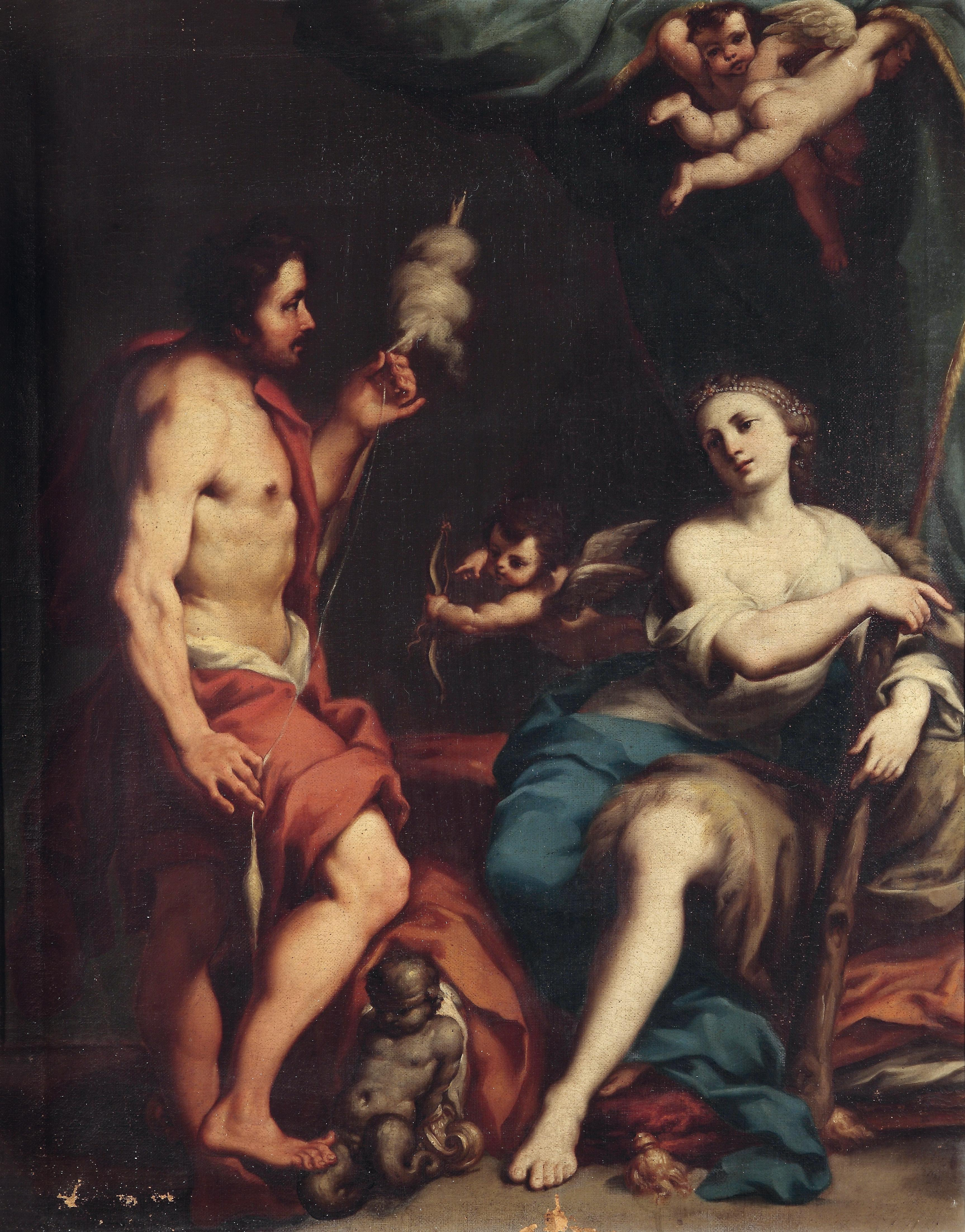
Hercules and Omphale, priv. col.

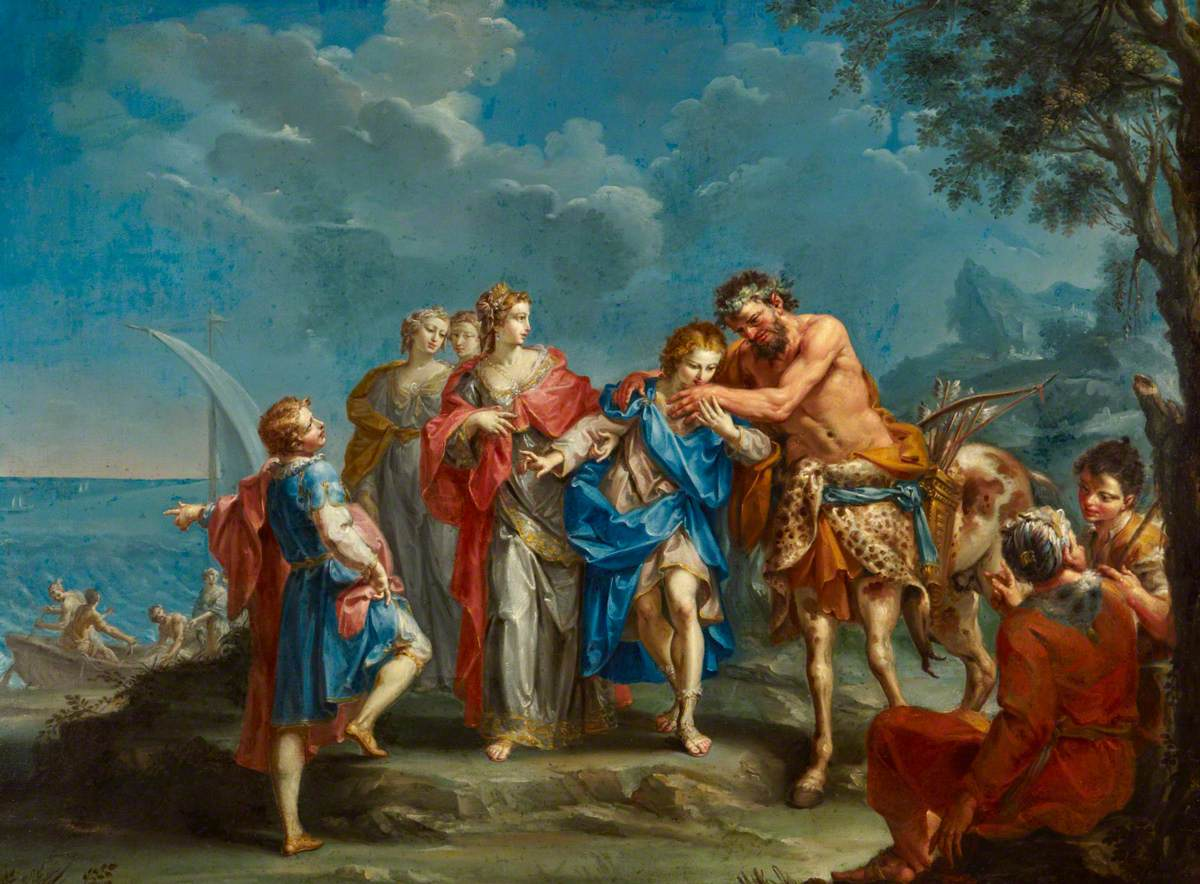
Achilles Takes Leave of the Centaur Chiron, c. 1720, National Trust

== Bibliography ==
- Hobbes, James R. (1849). Picture collector's manual adapted to the professional man, and the amateur. London: T&W Boone. p. 92.
