= Aureliano Milani =

Italian painter (1675–1749)

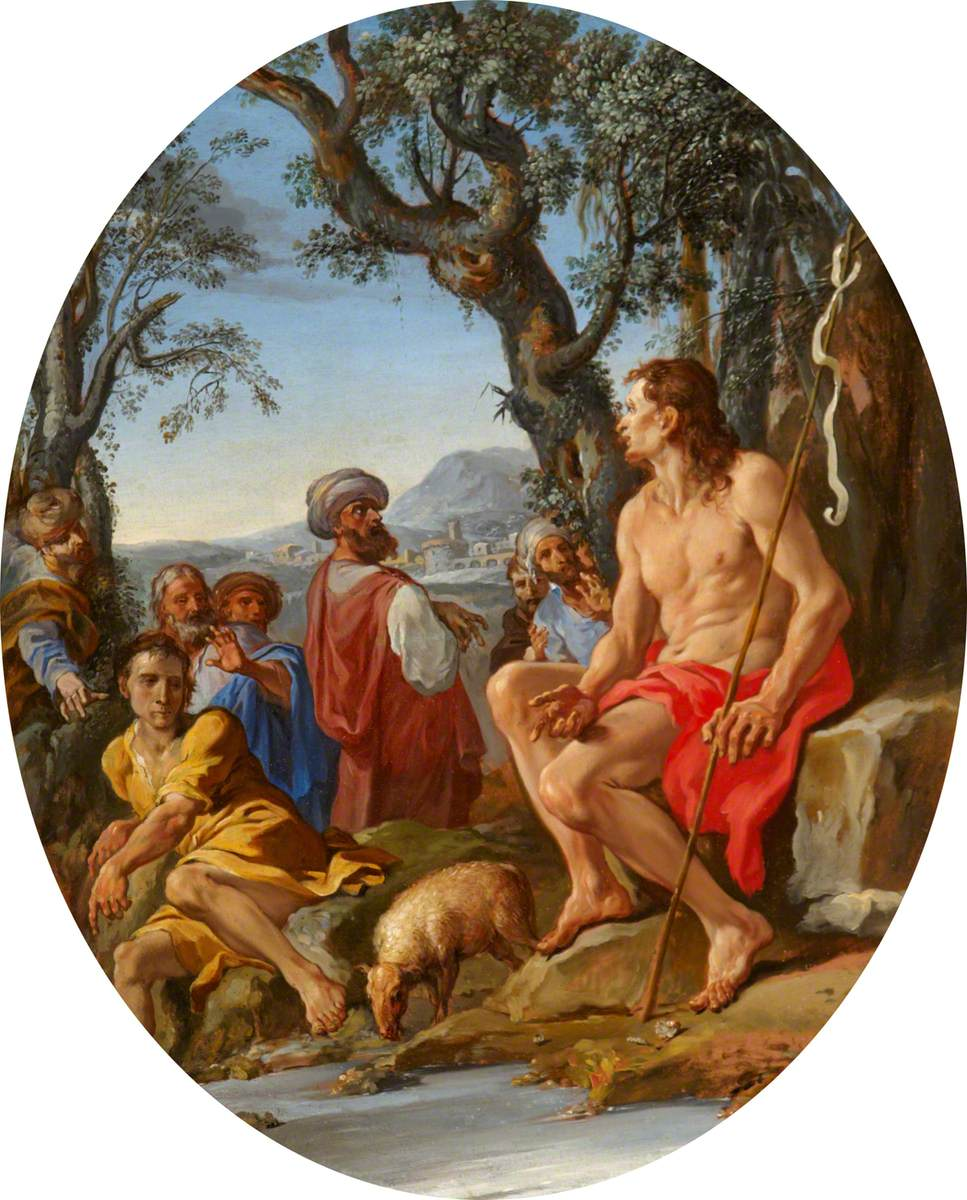
- Aureliano Milani, St. John the Baptist Preaching, 1738, National Trust
- Born: 1675; Bologna, Papal States
- Died: 1749 (aged 73–74); Rome, Papal States
- Education: Lorenzo Pasinelli; Cesare Gennari
- Known for: Painting
- Movement: Baroque

Aureliano Milani (1675 – 1749) was an Italian painter of the late-Baroque period, active in Bologna and Rome.

== Biography ==
Born into a poor family, he initially studied under his uncle, Giulio Cesare Milani, before entering the workshops of the Bolognese painters Lorenzo Pasinelli and Cesare Gennari. Inspired by the 16th-century classicism of the Carracci, he spent long periods studying the famous fresco cycles in Palazzo Fava and Palazzo Magnani in Bologna. Around 1700, Milani was commissioned to decorate the façade of the Servite Convent of Bologna. For the Servite Order, he painted his first major works: The Massacre of Saint Ursula and Her Companions, and the Resurrection – executed in a sober classical style reminiscent of Annibale Carracci. In the same period, Milani was commissioned two large history paintings by Francesco Farnese, Duke of Parma.

In 1718, Milani took up his residence in Rome, being ill able to support a family of nine children at Bologna. In Rome, he abounded with commissions, and was promoted with Domenico Maria Muratori and Donato Creti. In 1721, the Secretary of State, Cardinal Fabrizio Paolucci, commissioned him to paint frescoes for Albano Cathedral. Milani also painted altarpieces for Santi Bartolomeo ed Alessandro dei Bergamaschi, Santi Giovanni e Paolo al Celio (the titular church of Cardinal Paolucci) and the apse of Santa Maria Maddalena. Examples of his work include St. Peregrine Laziosi Healed by the Redeemer (1725), The Healing of a Blind Boy and The Miracle of the Madonna del Fuoco, in the Chapel of Saint Peregrine Laziosi within the Church of San Marcello al Corso. His most notable Roman work is perhaps the fresco cycle depicting scenes from the Labours of Hercules (1732–33) in the vault of the Galleria degli Specchi in the Palazzo Doria Pamphilj.

Besides his large religious and mithological frescoes, Milani was also known for his genre scenes, also inspired by the work of the Carracci. His most notable genre paintings are The Mission (Merano, priv. col.) and its pendant, The Market (Pesaro, Civic Museum of Palazzo Mosca), created for the Bolognese ambassador to Rome, Paolo Magnani. Milani was an avid draughtsman, particularly favouring a technique involving black chalk with white pencil highlights. He also produced copperplate engravings. Milani taught for many years in Bologna, and among other pupils of his were Giuseppe Marchesi (called il Sansone) and Antonio Gionima.

== Gallery ==
=== Paintings ===
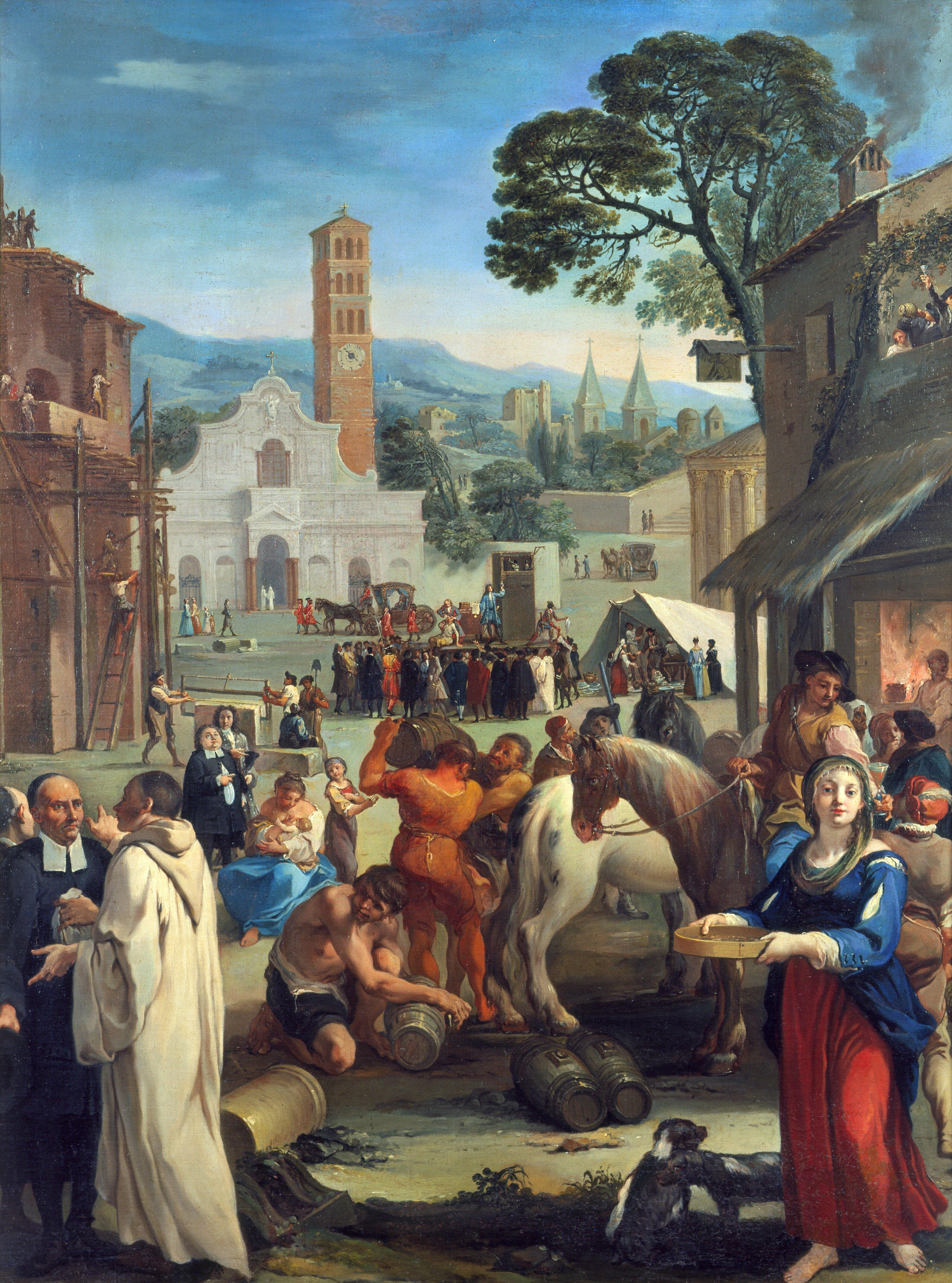
The Market, 1716, Pesaro, Civic Museum of Palazzo Mosca

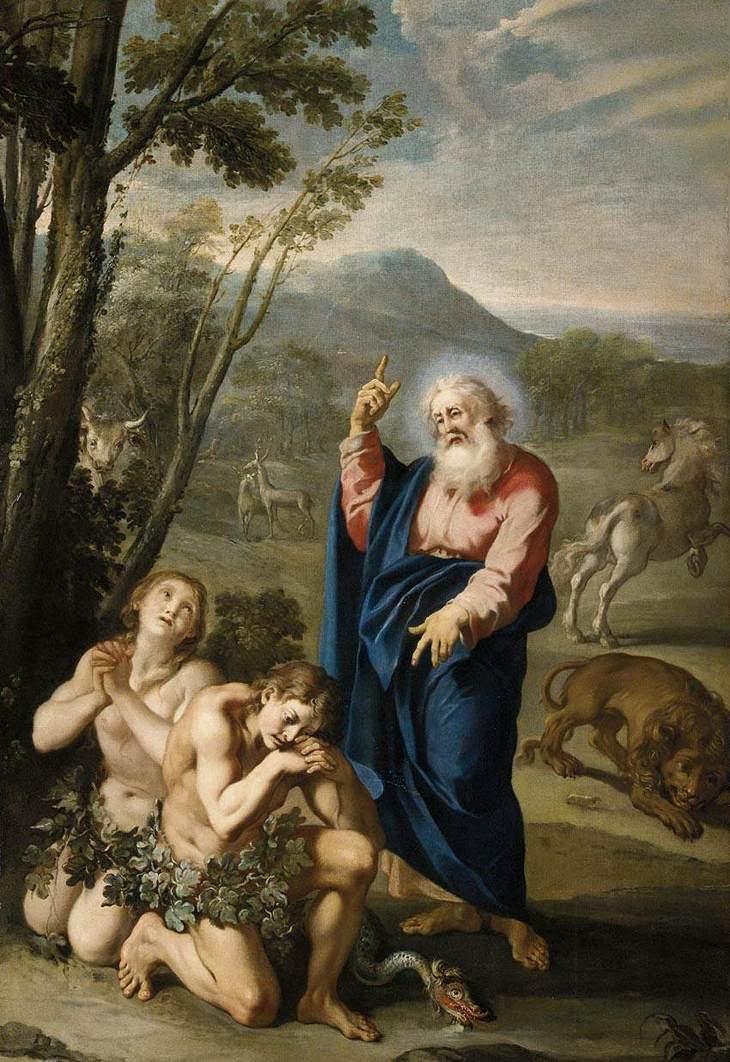
The Expulsion of Adam and Eve wikidata, c. 1700, priv. col.

Our Lady of the Fire, 1725, Minneapolis Institute of Art

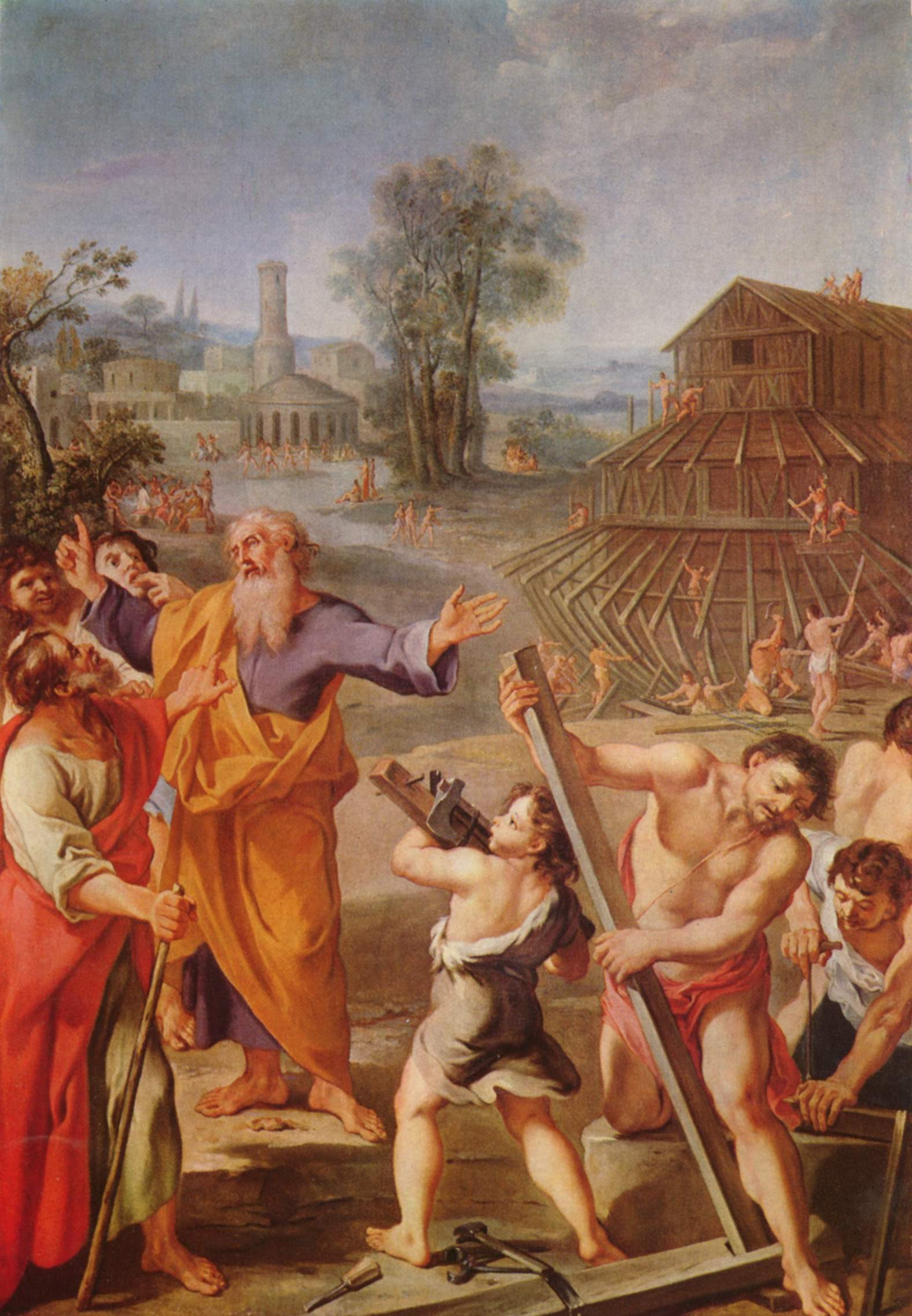
Building of the Ark of Noah, Museum of Fine Arts, Budapest

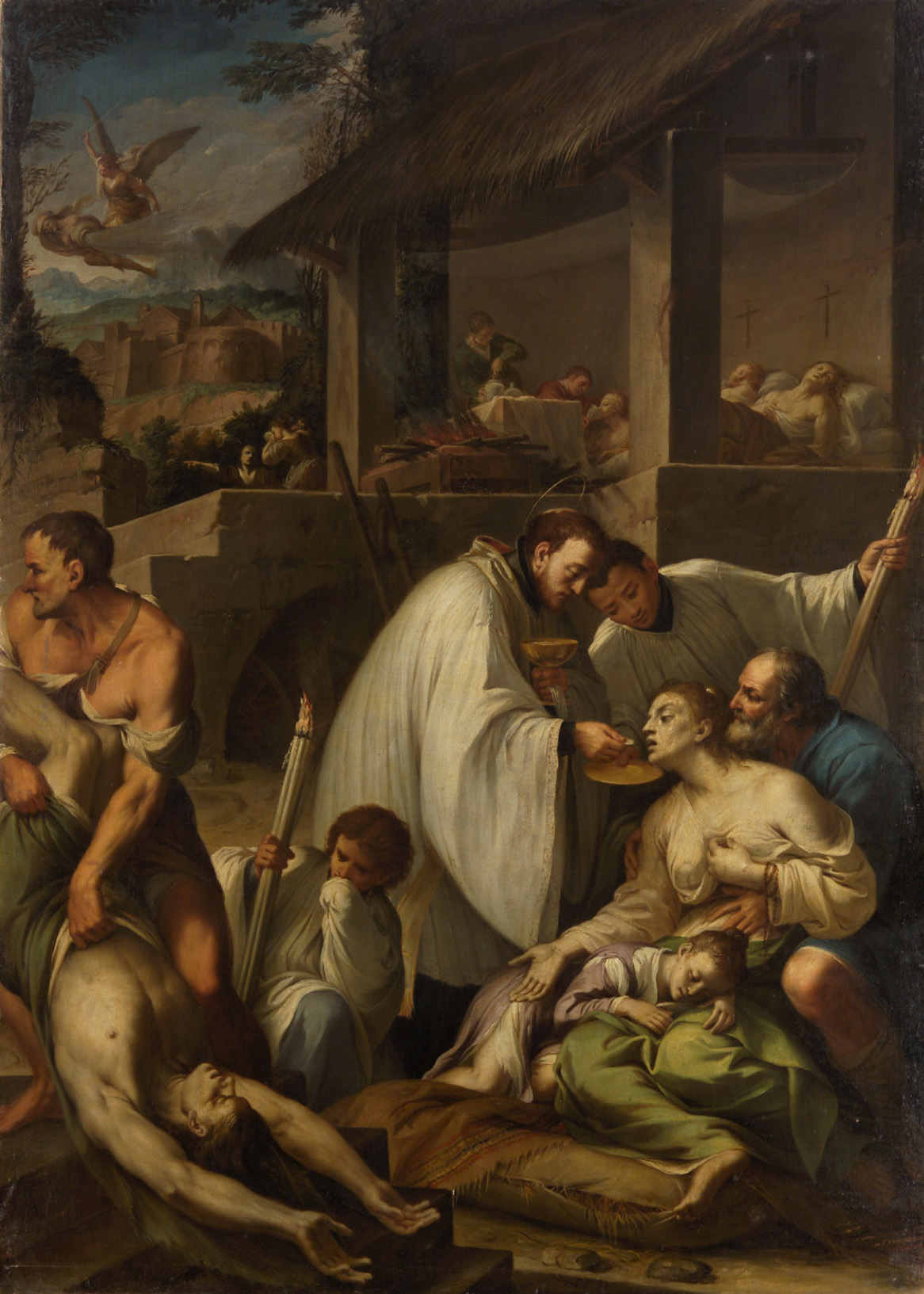
St. Aloysius Gonzaga among the victims of the plague, Kunsthistorisches Museum, Vienna

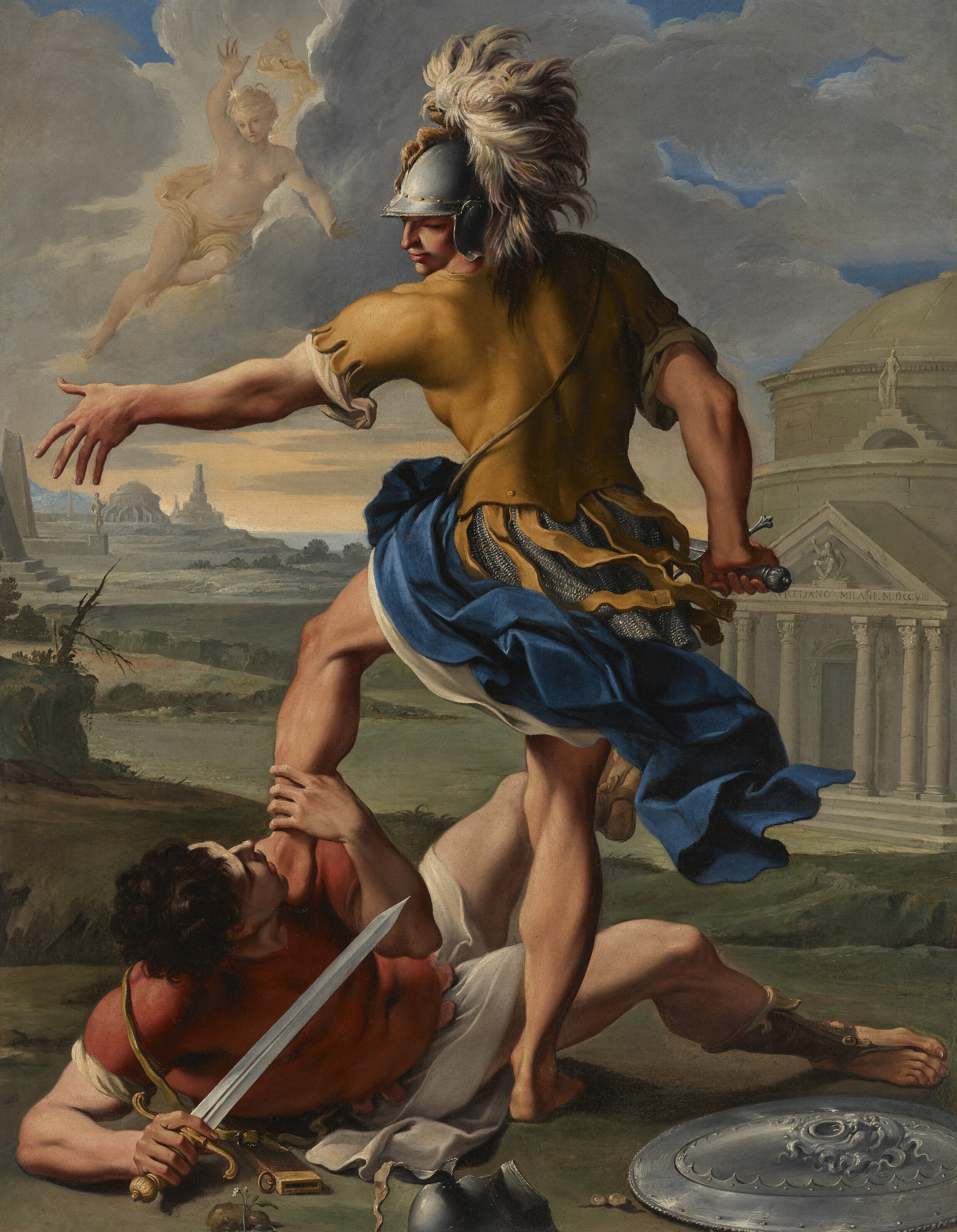
The combat of Aeneas and Turnus, priv. col.

=== Drawings ===
Rustic Building among Roman Ruins (no date), red chalk on laid paper, 32.4 x 53.1 cm., National Gallery of Art, Washington, D.C.

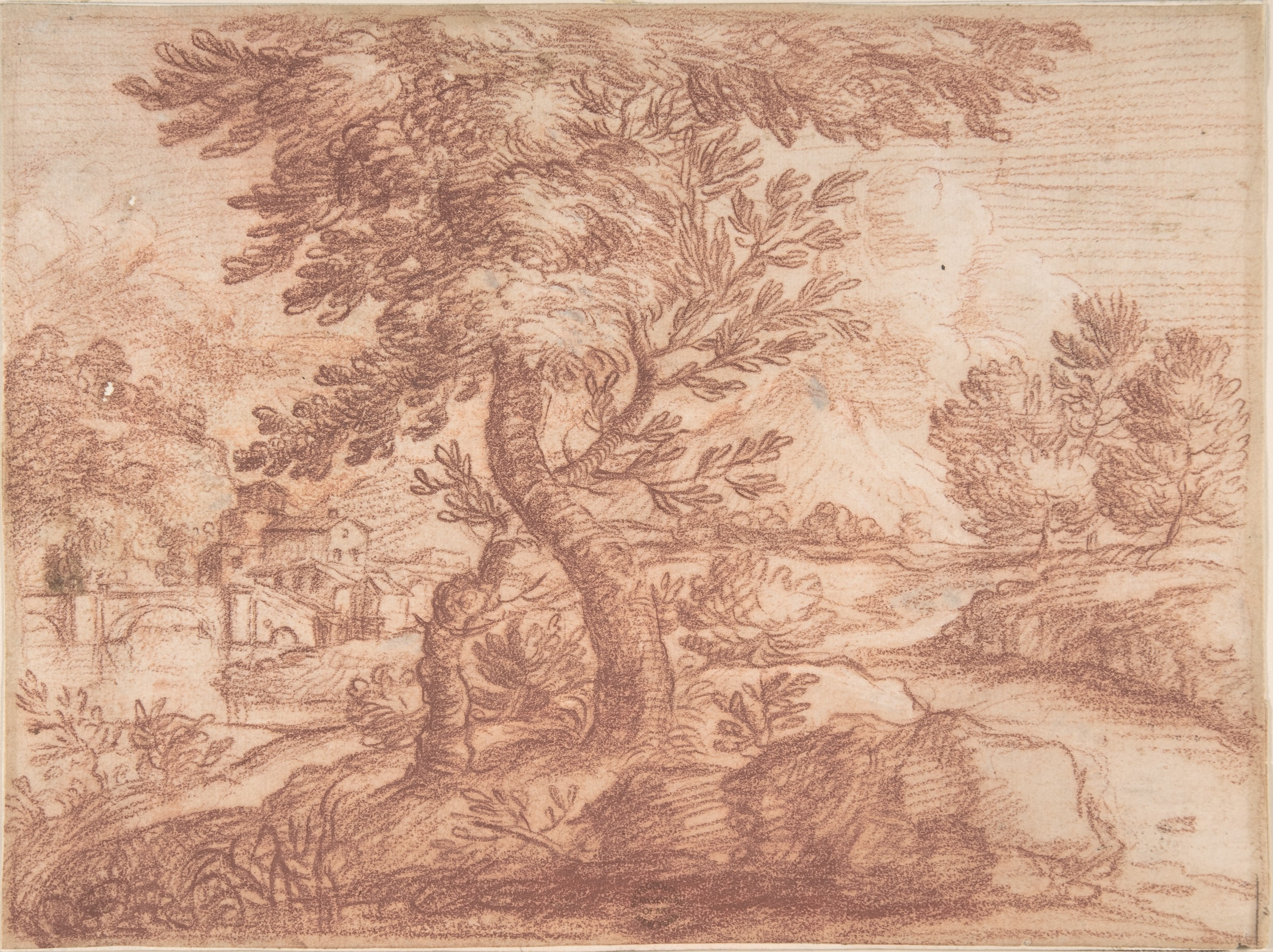
Landscape (no date), red chalk on light tan paper, 20 x 26.7 cm., Metropolitan Museum of Art, New York

Old Man on His Deathbed Tempted by Demons (no date), black chalk, stumped, 34.7 x 48.6 cm., Metropolitan Museum of Art, New York

The Death of Saint Francis (no date), black chalk, with stumping, 25.4 x 18.3 cm., Stephen Ongpin Collection, London

Scourging of Christ (no date), pen and brown ink, washed, 56.5 cm. x 42.4 cm., Metropolitan Museum of Art, New York

The Sacrifice of Noah (no date), black chalk, brush and gray wash, on light tan paper, 25.1 x 40 cm., Metropolitan Museum of Art, New York

== Bibliography ==
- Lanzi, Luigi (1847). History of Painting in Italy;From the Period of the Revival of the Fine Arts to the End of the Eighteenth Century (Volume III). Translated by Thomas Roscoe. London: Henry G. Bohn. pp. 152–3.
- Miller, Dwight C. (2003). "Milani, Aureliano". Grove Art Online. Oxford: Oxford University Press. doi:10.1093/gao/9781884446054.article.T058017.
