= Santa Lucia, Bologna =

Former Roman Catholic church building in Bologna, Italy

Coordinates: 44.489428°N 11.347576°E

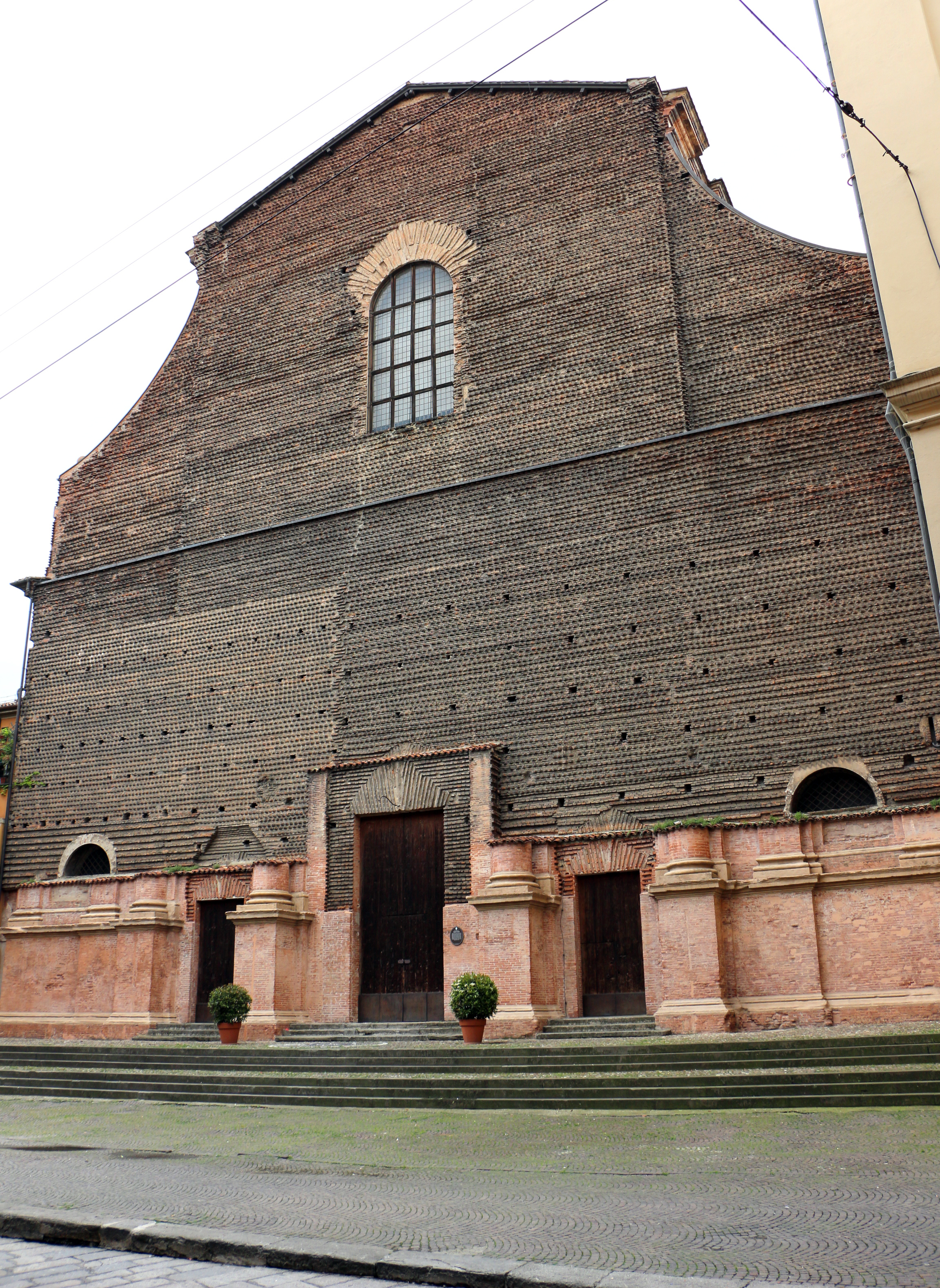
Santa Lucia, Bologna

Santa Lucia is a large, deconsecrated Roman Catholic church, located on Via Castiglione #36 in central Bologna. The building's brick facade was never completed; however, the Jesuits, owners of the church for over two centuries, decorated the interior with Baroque chapels, aligned along a spacious nave. For over a century, after suppression of the church, the building had multiple secular uses, as a barracks, warehouse, training workshop, and even a gym. But since a restoration in 1986–1986, the building has been used as the main assembly hall (aula magna) for the University of Bologna.

== History ==
A church at this site was built in the year 432, and dedicated to Santa Lucia by the then bishop of Bologna, then later patron saint, Saint Petronius. In 903, it was ruined by the Hungarian invasion. In 1208, the Order of Canons Lateran rebuilt another church and officiated there until 1418. In the 1500s, the church and the adjacent convent became property of the Jesuits who extensively restored the church. They were able to acquire most of the property in a triangle made by the vie Castiglione, Cartoleria and de Chiari, so that the former Borgo di Santa Lucia became known as the Borgo dei Gesuiti. It included the Collegio San Francesco Saverio (also called Collegio dei Nobili (in the area of the present teatro Duse); il Collegio San Luigi (also called the Collegio dei cittadini or dei borghesi) located at the corners of Vie De'Chiari and Cartoleria (now moved to Via d'Azeglio); and finally the Collegio di Santa Lucia (now housing the Liceo Galvani and the Biblioteca Zambeccari).

In 1623, the interiors of the church were refurbished by Girolamo Rainaldi in a style recalling the mother church of the Jesuit order, the Gesù in Rome. In 1775, the Jesuits were suppressed and the church briefly passed to the Barnabite order, only to be cloistered by Napoleonic forces. The interior has a chapel dedicated Saint Louis Gonzaga with an altar (1763) designed by Alfonso Torreggiani.

== See also ==
- List of Jesuit sites
