= Angelo Michele Cavazzoni =

Italian painter and engraver (1672–1743)

- Born: 1672; Bologna
- Died: March 9, 1743 (aged 70–71)
- Known for: Painting, Engraving
- Movement: Baroque

Angelo Michele Cavazzoni or Cavazzone (Bologna, 1672 - 1743) was an Italian painter and engraver, who trained with Giovanni Gioseffo Santi.

He became Prince of the Accademia Clementina in Bologna. Among his pupils was Bernardo Minozzi.
