= Nicola Bertucci =

Italian painter

Nicola Bertucci (c. 1710 – 2 January 1777) was an Italian painter of the late-Baroque or Rococo style, mainly painting figures in landscapes. He is also called l'Anconitano or Nicolo Bertuzzi.

== Biography ==
Born in Ancona, Bertuzzi was a pupil of Vittorio María Bigari. He painted a Life of the Blessed Franco (1753–54) for the Carmelite church in Medicina, in an effort where he collaborated with the specialist in quadratura, Vincenzo del Buono. He also painted Via Crucis canvases (1753) for churches in Ancona. He mainly worked in Bologna, including 14 small paintings for the Via Crucis of the church of the Hospital of the Church of San Biagio. After 1753, often collaborated with Carlo Lodi.

In the Pinacoteca civica of Forlì, there are Battle scenes and Landscape with army over bridge.

In 1732, he enrolled on the Accademia Clementina, and in 1734–35, he won the first prize for an architectural project; he soon joined that institution as a member in 1751, and later, as a director. He died in Bologna.

== Sources ==
- Artemisia site
- entry
