= Flaminio Innocenzo Minozzi =

Italian painter

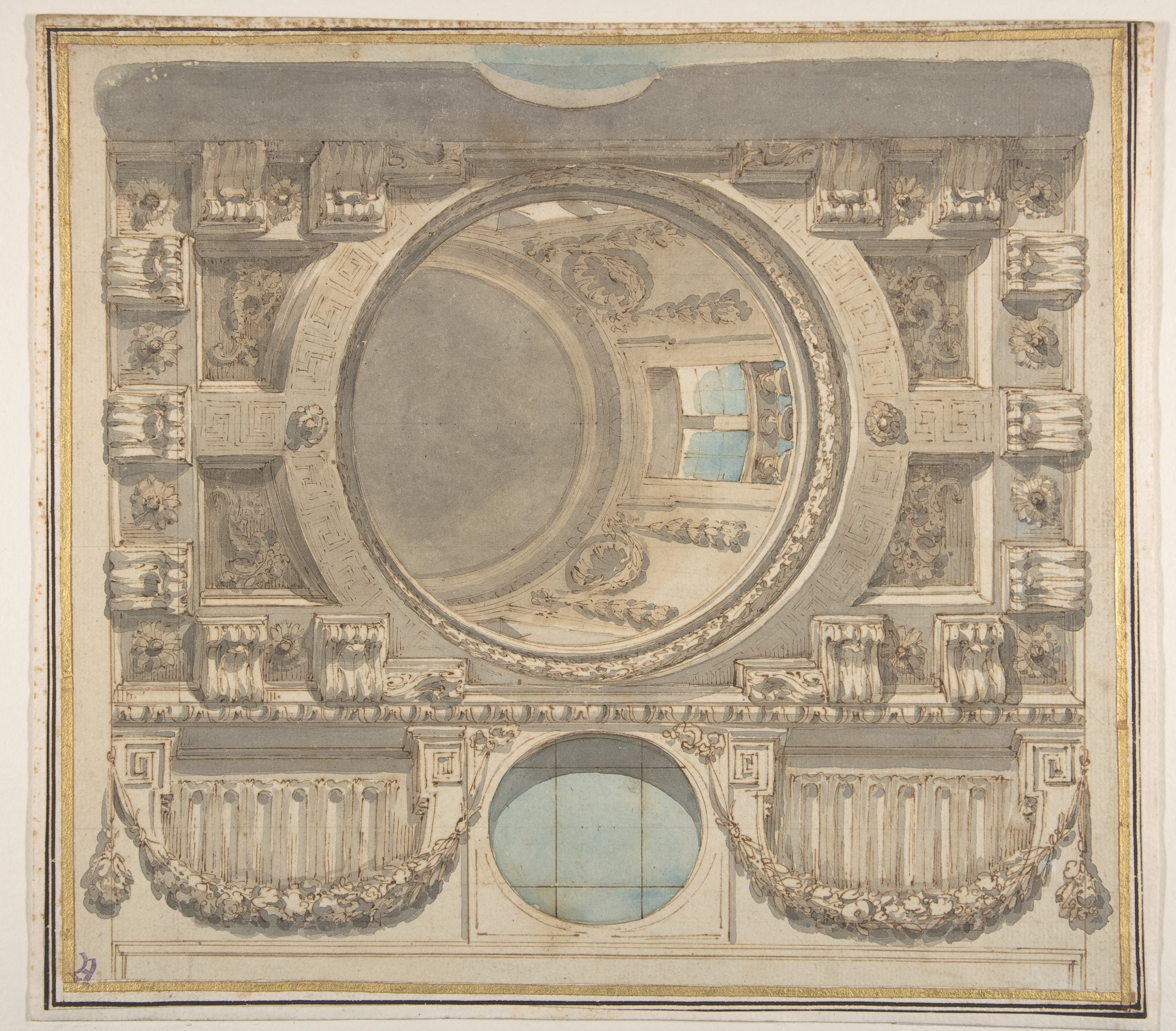
Architectural design for a ceiling with a dome by Flaminio Innocenzo Minozzi

Flaminio Innocenzo Minozzi (3 October 1735 – 1817) was an Italian painter, mainly of quadratura. He was a pupil of his father Bernardo Minozzi, a landscape painter in Bologna. He won the Marsili-Aldrovandi Award (Premio Marsili-Aldrovandi) at the Accademia Clementina and worked with Carlo Galli Bibiena. He later moved to work in Lisbon.

His works are held in many museums worldwide, including the Metropolitan Museum of Art, the Minneapolis Institute of Art, the Museum of Fine Arts, Boston, the Princeton University Art Museum, and the University of Michigan Museum of Art.
