= Alfonso Torreggiani =

Italian architect

- Aldrovandi Chapel, San Petronio (1743–50)
- Born: 17 November 1682; Budrio, Papal States
- Died: 29 April 1764 (aged 81); Bologna, Papal States
- Education: Giuseppe Antonio Torri
- Occupation: Architect
- Known for: Façade of Palazzo Aldrovandi, Bologna
- Movement: Rococo

Alfonso Torreggiani (17 November 1682 – 29 April 1764) was an Italian architect of the Rococo period. Together with Carlo Francesco Dotti, he was one of the most important architects active in Bologna in the first half of the 18th century.

== Life ==
Alfonso Torreggiani was born in Budrio on 17 November 1682 to Amadio Torreggiani and Apollonia Calegari. His father, a master bricklayer, was perhaps a descendant of the late Renaissance Bolognese silversmith Sebastiano Torreggiani, a disciple of Guglielmo della Porta. An apprentice of Giuseppe Antonio Torri, he became intensely active in the city of Bologna working on the design of churches and private buildings and as a consultant on the organisation and reconstruction of existing buildings: for example, the Church of Sant'Ignazio, 1726; the interior of the Church of La Maddalena, 1735; the Palazzo Torfanini (then property of the Princes of Este) in the Via Galliera, 1735; continued the construction of the Palazzo Aldrovandi in 1741, the west front of the cathedral, 1744–52, and the high altar in the Basilica of San Domenico. Torreggiani became prince of the Accademia Clementina in 1749, and had the patronage of Cardinal Pompeo Aldrovandi, who entrusted him with the façade of his palace in Via Galliera (1744–52) and the sumptuous Aldrovandi Chapel in San Petronio (1743–50) His principal clients, besides the nobility and the rising bourgeoisie, were the Bolognese Curia and the Society of Jesus. Torreggiani died in Bologna on 19 April 1764, aged 81.

== Works ==
Torregiani's first work was the church of San Lorenzo (1704; completed by Giuseppe Tubertini) in Budrio. He was also architect to the Curia and to the Jesuit Order, which offered him opportunities for ecclesiastical work in and around Bologna. Such projects included the sacristy (1724) of Santa Maria del Carmine, Medicina, followed by the Jesuit church of Sant'Ignazio (1726), and the oratory of San Filippo Neri (1731), both in Bologna.

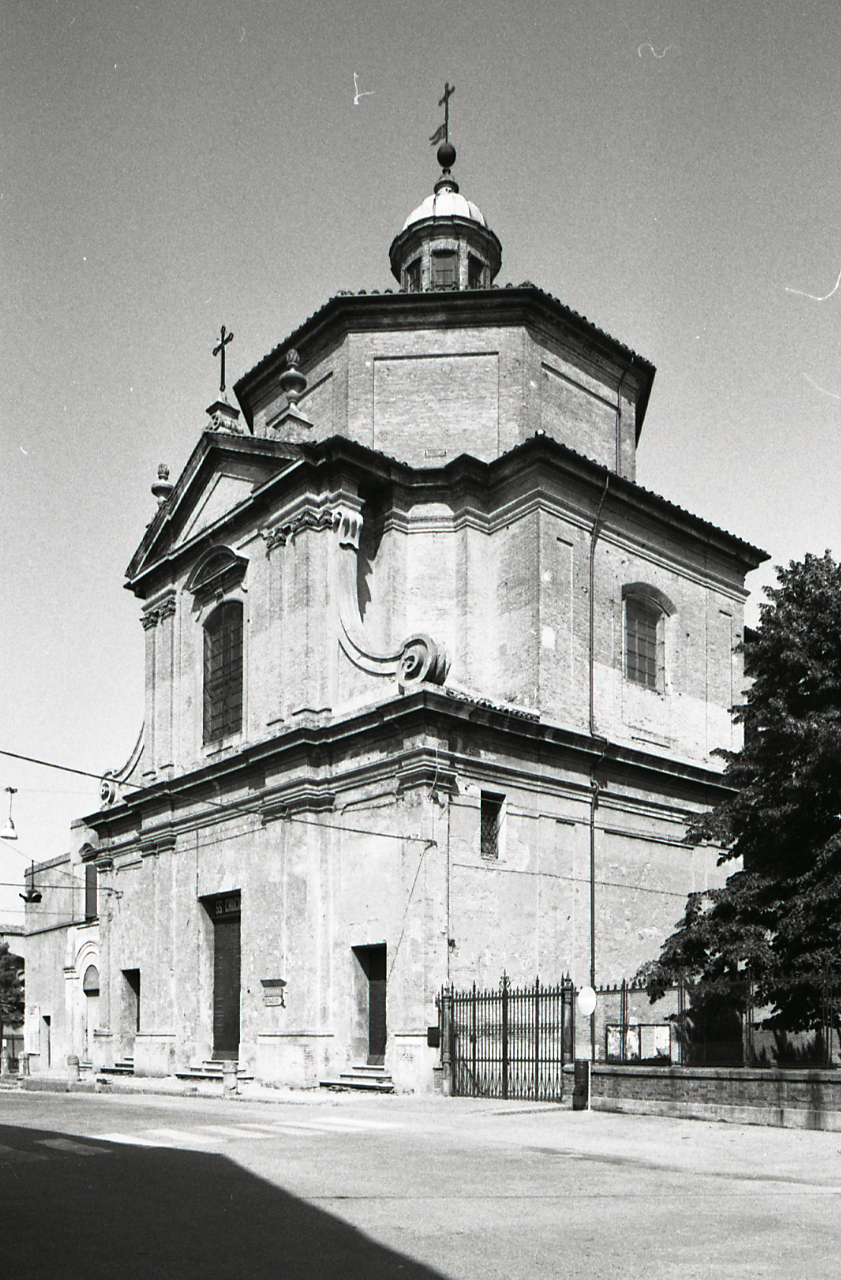
Chiesa dell'Assunta, Medicina (1748)

He started work in 1743 on the completion of Bologna Cathedral, which Giovanni Magenta had started to rebuild in 1605. Torreggiani’s design for the façade, with ornate portal and window mouldings, and a curvilinear pediment, was only partly incorporated in the final work, carried out by Francesco Tadolini. The interior portal and coretti (small private rooms giving on to the church; 1755) were, however, executed to his design. Of his proposals for the renovation of the church of San Domenico, he was commissioned to execute only the high altar (1745). In the Chiesa dell'Assunta (1748), Medicina, Torreggiani followed the 16th-century Bolognese style of Magenta, with monochrome interiors lit by thermal windows at the sides, but the wall surfaces are more forcefully articulated with engaged columns and rocaille decoration. The façade of the modest church of Sant'Agostino, Reggio Emilia, was of two storeys, curved in plan, and articulated with engaged columns.

Although Torreggiani designed the Jesuit church of San Rocco (1737–54) in Parma, it was executed by Edelberto dalla Nave (1681–1742). During a period of economic hardship in Bologna in the first half of the 18th century, architectural commissions from the nobility were largely for improvements to existing palaces. Torreggiani’s most important work was the façade and main apartments (1744–52) of the Palazzo Aldrovandi, for whose owner, Cardinal Pompeo Aldrovandi, he had previously designed the Aldrovandi Chapel (1743–50) in the Basilica of San Petronio, inspired by the works of Francesco Borromini. The façade, with rocaille window pediments and a central curvilinear balcony, has been compared with the contemporaneous remodelling of the Palazzo Doria Pamphilj (1730–35) in Rome by Gabriele Valvassori, but the classical pediment over the central three bays reveals a more sober composition.

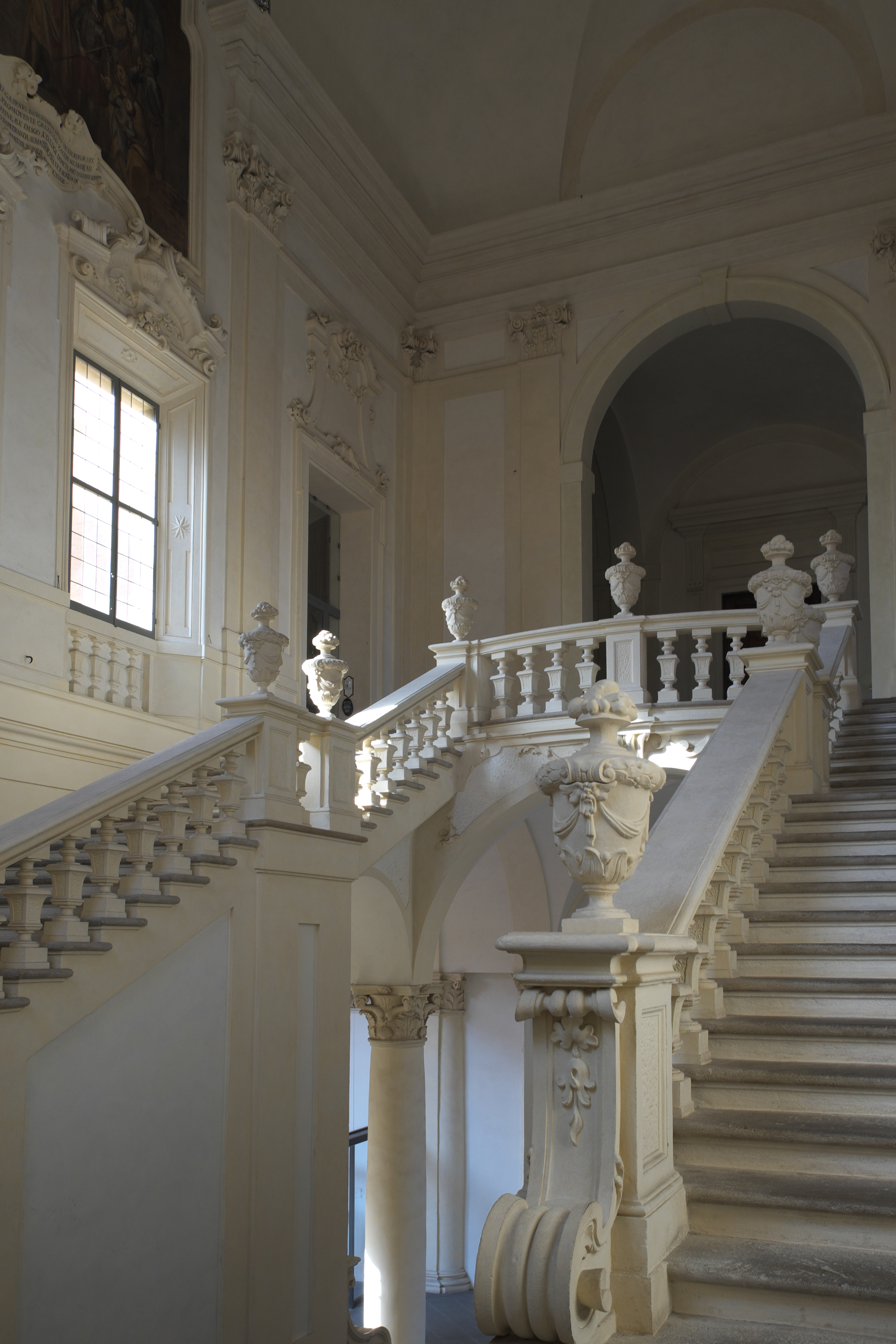
The scenic entrance stairwell of Palazzo Davia Bargellini, Bologna, designed in 1730 by Dotti and Torreggiani

Other works on palaces included the façade (1753) of the Palazzo Dondini (now Sassoli de’ Banchi), and the Palazzo Belloni (completed 1756), both in Bologna. Torreggiani also directed the works of the Palazzo Monti and the Palazzo Davia Bargellini, Bologna, which had been started by Dotti. He executed several important staircases: at the Palazzo Malvezzi de' Medici (1725), Bologna, and at the Villa Sampiera (1758), where the staircase was illuminated by a lantern decorated with a quadratura painting on its vault.

As his fame rapidly spread in Northern Italy, Torreggiani received commissions from outside his native city. From 1746 to 1755, he designed the Jesuit College in Rimini, now the City Museum. In 1750, he designed the façade of the Palazzo Montevecchio at Fano. In 1756, he planned the façade and interior decoration of Palazzo Cavriani, Mantua, which was rebuilt after the collapse of the earlier residence of the Cavriani family. In 1763, the Mantuan Jesuits entrusted him the project of the Palazzo degli Studi.

Torreggiani’s work was characterized by a restrained architectural composition combined with elaborate and stylized decoration, which represents the closest to a Rococo phase in Bolognese architecture. Among his main collaborators were the late-Baroque quadratura painter Vittorio Bigari and the Rococo stuccoist Angelo Piò, a pupil of the leading Bolognese sculptor Giuseppe Maria Mazza.

== Bibliography ==
- Foratti, Aldo (1935). "Alfonso Torreggiani (1682-1764)". Bologna. 5 (XIII): 25–44.
- Matteucci, Anna M. (1969). Carlo Francesco Dotti e l'architettura bolognese del Settecento. Bologna: Nuova Alfa. ISBN 978-8877792334.
- Matteucci, Anna M. (1988). "Alfonso Torreggiani architetto dei Gesuiti". In Gian Paolo Brizzi; Anna Maria Matteucci (eds.). Dall'isola Alla Città. I Gesuiti a Bologna. Bologna: Nuova Alfa.
- Matteucci, Anna M. (1988). L'architettura del Settecento. Turin: UTET. ISBN 978-8802041995.
- "Torreggiani, Alfonso". Grove Art Online. Oxford: Oxford University Press. 2003. doi:10.1093/gao/9781884446054.article.T085718.
- Medde, Silvia (2007). "Alfonso Torreggiani e la ristrutturazione del palazzo Cavriani di Mantova". Arte Lombarda. 151 (3): 81–90. JSTOR 43132803.
- Guidotti Magnani, Daniele Pascale (2019). "TORREGGIANI, Alfonso". Dizionario Biografico degli Italiani (in Italian). Vol. 96: Toja–Trivelli. Rome: Institute of the Italian Encyclopaedia. ISBN 978-88-12-00032-6.
