= Vincenzo Mazza =

Italian painter

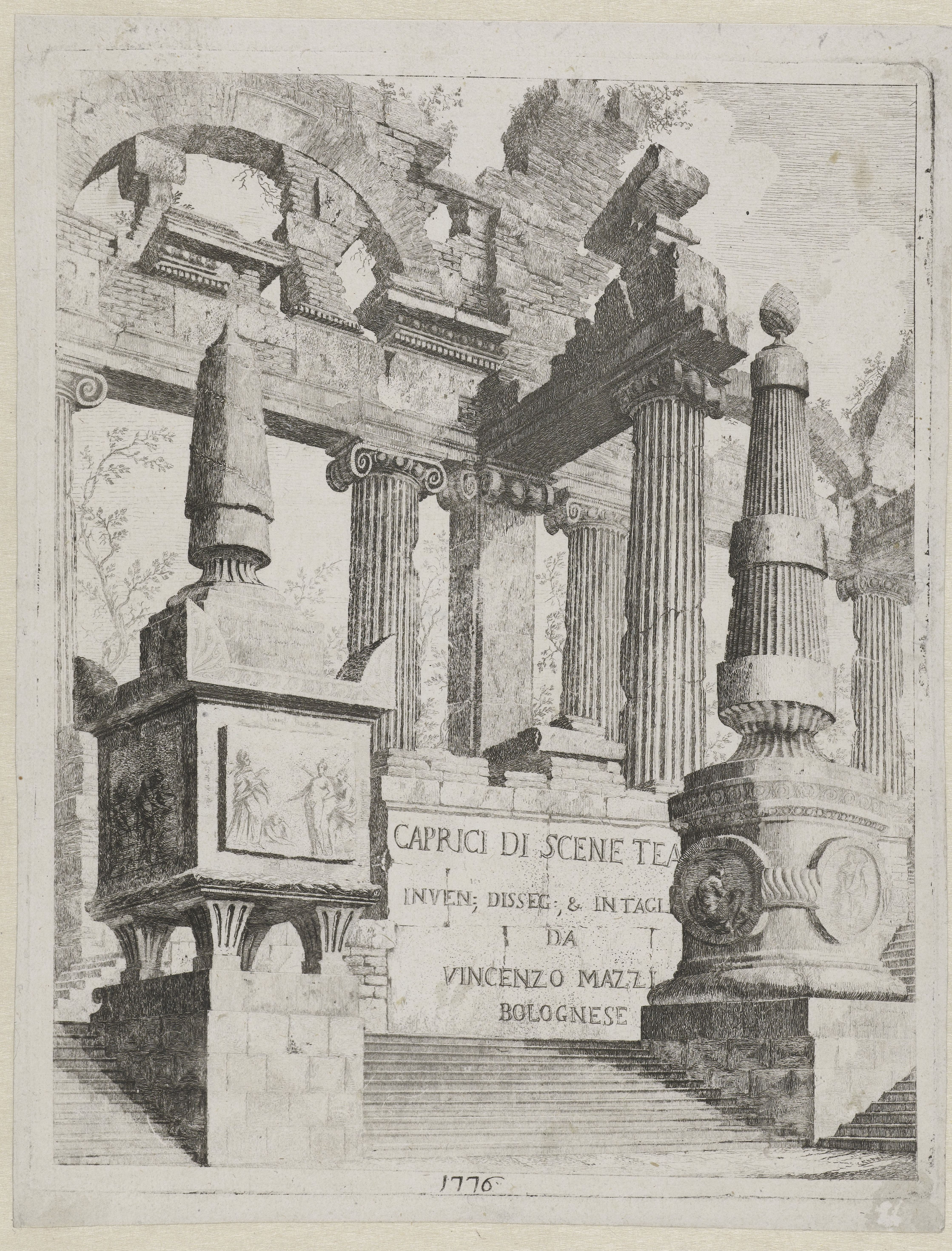

Vincenzo Mazza (c 1748–1790) was an Italian painter and scenic designer for theaters, mainly in his native Bologna. In 1788, he served as principe of Accademia Clementina. He served as architetto teatrale for the Teatro Pubblico of Bologna.

As a scenic designer for Bolognese theaters, he also worked in a sphere that included Antonio Bibiena, Raimondo Compangnini, Vincenzo Martinelli, Paolo Dardani, Gaetano Alemani, Vicenzo Conti, and Mauro Braccioli.
