= Inzaghi =

- Pronunciation: Italian: [inˈdzaːɡi]
- Language: Italian

Origin
- Origin: Inzago, Milan, Italy
- Region of origin: Western Lombardy, Italy

Inzaghi is an Italian surname, rarely found as a given name.

== People with the name ==
=== Surname ===
- Filippo Inzaghi (born 1973), Italian former footballer, currently a manager
- Simone Inzaghi (born 1976), Italian former footballer and current manager; brother of Filippo Inzaghi

=== Given name ===
- Inzaghi Donígio (born 1985), Bissau-Guinean footballer

== Fictional characters ==
- Inzaghi, Vincenzo's pigeon companion in the Korean TV series Vincenzo

== See also ==
- Pinacoteca Domenico Inzaghi, Budrio, an art museum in Emilia-Romagna, Italy
