= Vincenzo Torregiani =

Italian painter

Vincenzo Torregiani or Torreggiani (born in Budrio, active in Bologna 1742 - 1770) was an Italian painter.

== Biography ==
He trained under Stefano Orlandi in Bologna. For a few years, he moved to Florence and Rome, where he completed some fresco and tempera. He contributed perspective paintings in the cloister of the Scuderia of San Michele in Bosco. His son Giuseppe, active in 1760, followed his father's profession.
