= Stefano Orlandi =

Italian painter

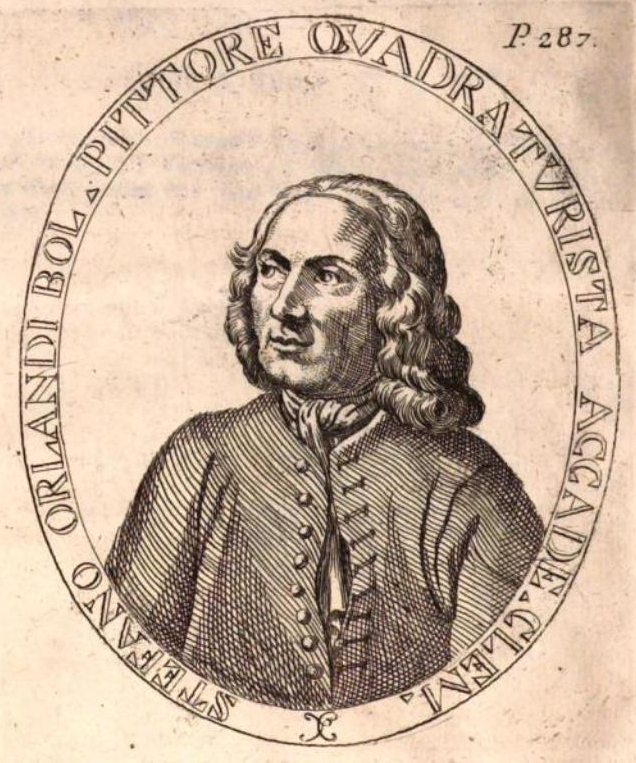
Portrait of Stefano Orlandi

Stefano Orlandi (1681 – 29 July 1760) was an Italian painter, active mainly in Bologna, Papal States, in the architectural perspective painting. He is known for painting fanciful architectural canvases, known as Capricci.

== Biography ==
He trained with his father, Odoardo Orlandi, a pupil of Lorenzo Pasinelli. Stefano first aspired to be a stucco artist, but then began learning from a mediocre local painter known as Antonio Rizzini. He then entered the studio of Pompeo Aldrovandini, who taught him quadratura, and with Pompeo, he went to Rome starting in 1713 where he completed scenography for the Teatro Capranica. He painted the church of Santi Giovanni e Petronio, working with the figure painter Giuseppe Gambarini. He was influenced by Giuseppe Bibiena. After 32 months in Rome, and only 23 years old, he returns to Bologna, working with Gioseffo Orsoni in quadratura, also completing scenic designs for theaters in Lucca and Turin. He formed collaborations with Vittorio Bigari. He helped decorate the entry stairwell and a hall in the Palazzo Aldrovandi and a gallery in the Palazzo Ranuzzi. He painted in the Palazzo Pubblico of Faenza and in the Palazzo degli Architi in Milan. He painter in the chapel of San Petronio of Cardinal Aldrovandi. He painted for Count Pellegrini in Verona. In Brescia, he worked with Francesco Monti and painted in the Palazzo of the Marchese Martinengo and in the Casa Canzago, and in a chapel of the Dominican church. Back in Bologna, he painted decorations in the Archbishop's church of San Pietro and in the Oratory of the Virgin of the Centura and the oratorian's chapel in San Giacomo Maggiore. He painted much of the quadratura of the Palazzo Aldrovandi. He painted in the church of the Convertite, quadratura for the 5th chapel of the church of the Celestines, and for the Monti Chapel in the church of Corpus Domini, and the Altar of St Vincent Ferrer in San Petronio.

Among works outside of Italy, is a peculiar canvas depicting A Church with Pagan Sacrifices at a Burning Altar in the Southampton City Art Gallery in England.

He suffered a stroke in 1755, and was bed ridden for four years. Among his pupils was Gaetano Alemani, Giovanni Zanardi, Paolo Ballarini, Vincenzo Torregiani, Giovanni Paolo Anderlini as well as his sons Francesco, Stefano Orlandi the younger, and Giovanni Battista Sandoni.
