= Villa Fraccaroli =

19th-century villa in Veneto, Italy

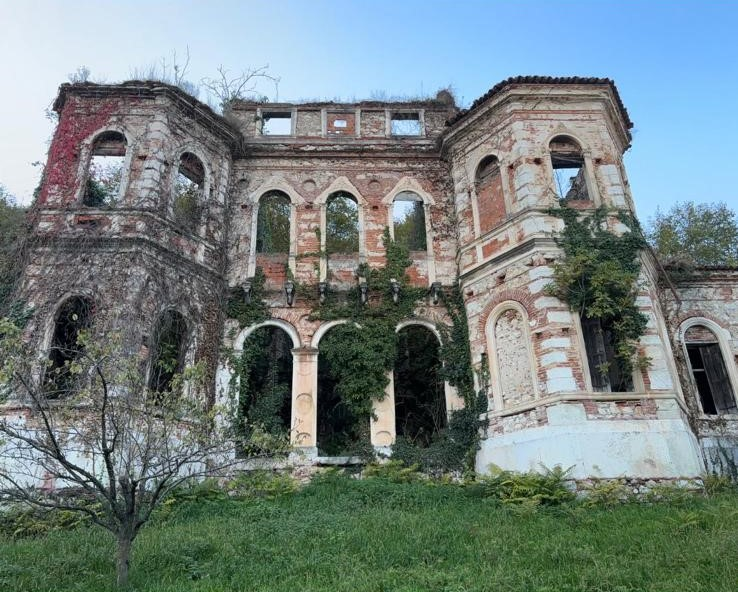
- Main facade of Villa Fraccaroli
- Location of Villa Fraccaroli

General information
- Status: Never completed
- Type: Villa
- Architectural style: Neoclassical
- Location: Vicenza, Via Libertà, 219, 36013, Piovene Rocchette, VI, Italy
- Coordinates: 45.7564°N 11.4298°E
- Current tenants: Currently abandoned
- Year built: 1853
- Demolished: Partially, during the First World War in 1917
- Owner: Nobles Alessandro Fraccaroli and Lucia Verlato

Design and construction
- Architect: Antonio Caregaro Negrin
- Known for: The tale of a ghostly child

Villa Fraccaroli, also called The Castle of Spirits, is a 19th-century villa in the town of Piovene Rocchette in the province of Vicenza, in the Veneto region of northern Italy. It was initially commissioned by the Fraccaroli family for Paolina Carlotta Fraccaroli and her husband Francesco Dalla Negra who were landowners in the region. Its history is connected with the nearby Renaissance-era Villa Verlato. Ownership of the property has changed hands multiple times with no significant efforts to restore or inhabit it. The villa is currently abandoned and privately owned.

Villa Fraccaroli is associated with stories related to the black magic practices of the nobleman Francesco Dalla Negra, and a tragic accident which occurred during its construction.

== Location ==
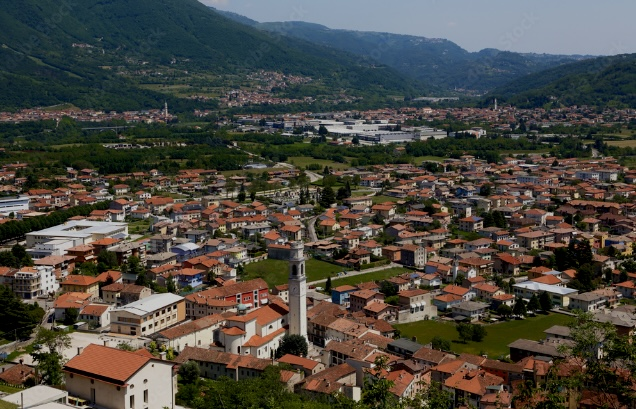
Overview of Piovene Rocchette, Vincenza, Italy

Villa Fraccaroli is on the northern perimeter of Piovene Rocchette, a town of approximately 8,000 inhabitants situated in the foothills of the Venetian Pre-Alps. It is located at Via della Libertà (The Road of Freedom), on a south facing slope that offers views of the surrounding countryside and mountains, including Monte Summano. Villa Fraccaroli remains unfinished and is surrounded by overgrown gardens, hilly terrain, dense forests, and agricultural fields, typical of the scattered villas and historical estates in the Veneto region.

== Origins ==
=== Fraccaroli and Verlato families ===
The history of the Fraccaroli family is closely connected to the Verlato family and Villa Verlato, located at Villaverla, 10 kilometers from Villa Fraccaroli. The Verlato family dates back to the early 11th century. According to historical accounts, Giovanni Verla, who is said to have been part of the emperor's entourage, settled in the region after Emperor Henry II's campaign. Throughout the centuries, the family expanded their holdings by acquiring lands in various municipalities, notably in the provinces of Vicenza and Thiene. The Verlato coat of arms features six cherries, signifying their noble status. Originally owned by the Verlato family, Villa Verlato came into the Fraccaroli family's possession through the marriage of Lucia Verlato to Alessandro Fraccaroli. From this union, their daughter, Paolina Carlotta, was born. In 1853, her parents decided to construct the Villa Fraccaroli for her. Paolina Carlotta eventually became the sole heir to the family's estate. After her marriage to Francesco Dalla Negra, she gave birth to a child in Arzignano, a town in the province of Vicenza where Francesco owned extensive landholdings.

=== Antonio Caregaro Negrin ===
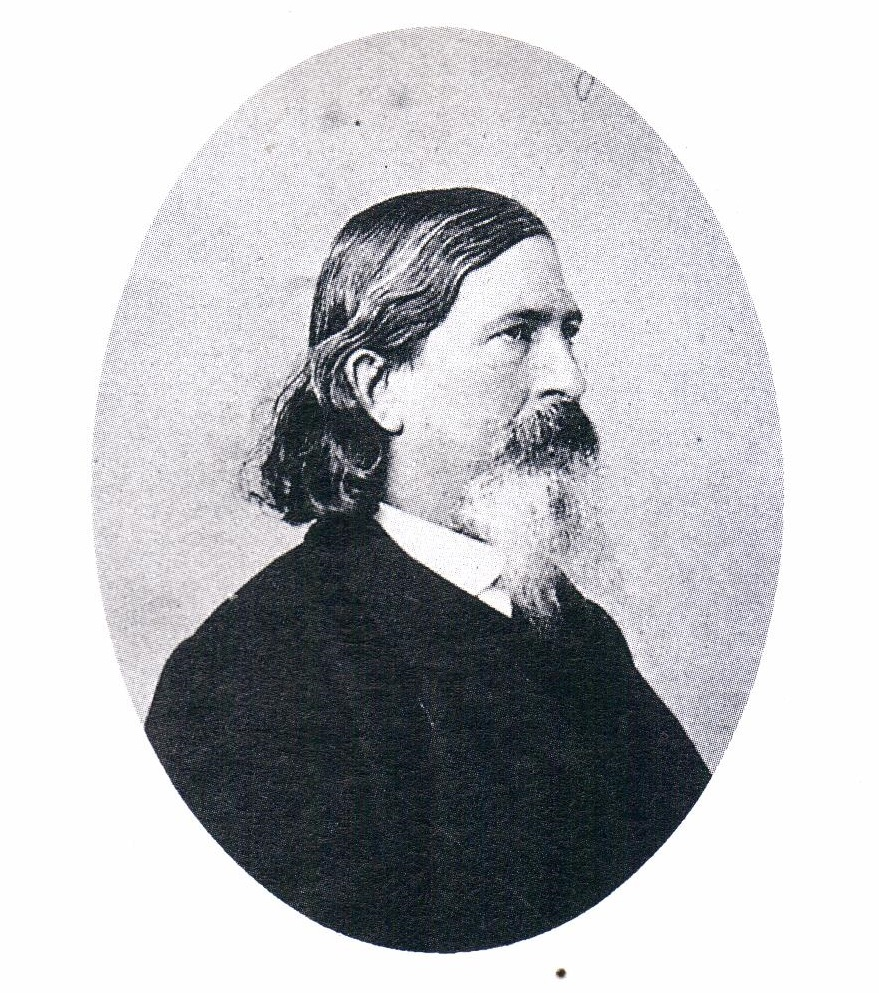
Antonio Caregaro Negrin, before 1898. Source: A Manual for "Nuova Schio" Author: Unknown

Antonio Caregaro Negrin, the architect of Villa Fraccaroli, was born in Vicenza on June 13, 1821, and died in the same city on December 26, 1898. Although classically trained, he embraced contemporary trends, becoming a pioneer of the Liberty Style (Art Nouveau). Negrin began his career with a technical drawing course before fully delving into architecture. He undertook numerous restoration projects for influential Vicentine families, such as Villa Trevisanato, Villa Gazzotti and Villa Tavazzano.

In 1847, Negrin restored the scenic elements of the Teatro Olimpico in Vicenza, an achievement that earned him the title of Olympic Academician. This honorary title is conferred upon members of the Olympic Academy of Vicenza, one of Italy's oldest and most esteemed cultural academies. Negrin's legacy lives on at the Biblioteca Civica Bertoliana in Vicenza, which preserves his drawings, projects and publications.

Negrin was a supporter of his homeland, and in 1848 fought against the Austrian uprisings, both in Venice and Vicenza. After the fall of Venice, he moved to the home of a friend, Ippolito Cabianca, where he stayed until 1850, when he returned to Venice and resumed his activities. During this period, he began to adopt the English style for garden design, eventually becoming a leading figure in this field, becoming also the trusted architect of Alessandro Rossi. In 1853, he was commissioned by Paolina Fraccaroli and her husband, Francesco Dalla Negra, to design and build Villa Fraccaroli.

Beyond his architectural achievements, the architect Negrin also made contributions to theory and literature. His book Scritti sui giardini (Writings on Gardens) delves into the symbiotic relationship between architecture and nature, advancing discussions on landscape and design philosophy. His speech, Nella commemorazione del 10 giugno 1848 sul Monte Berico: parole pronunciate (In Commemoration of June 10, 1848, at Monte Berico: Words Spoken), reflects his engagement with the 1848 uprising and his awareness of the sociopolitical issues of his time.

== History ==
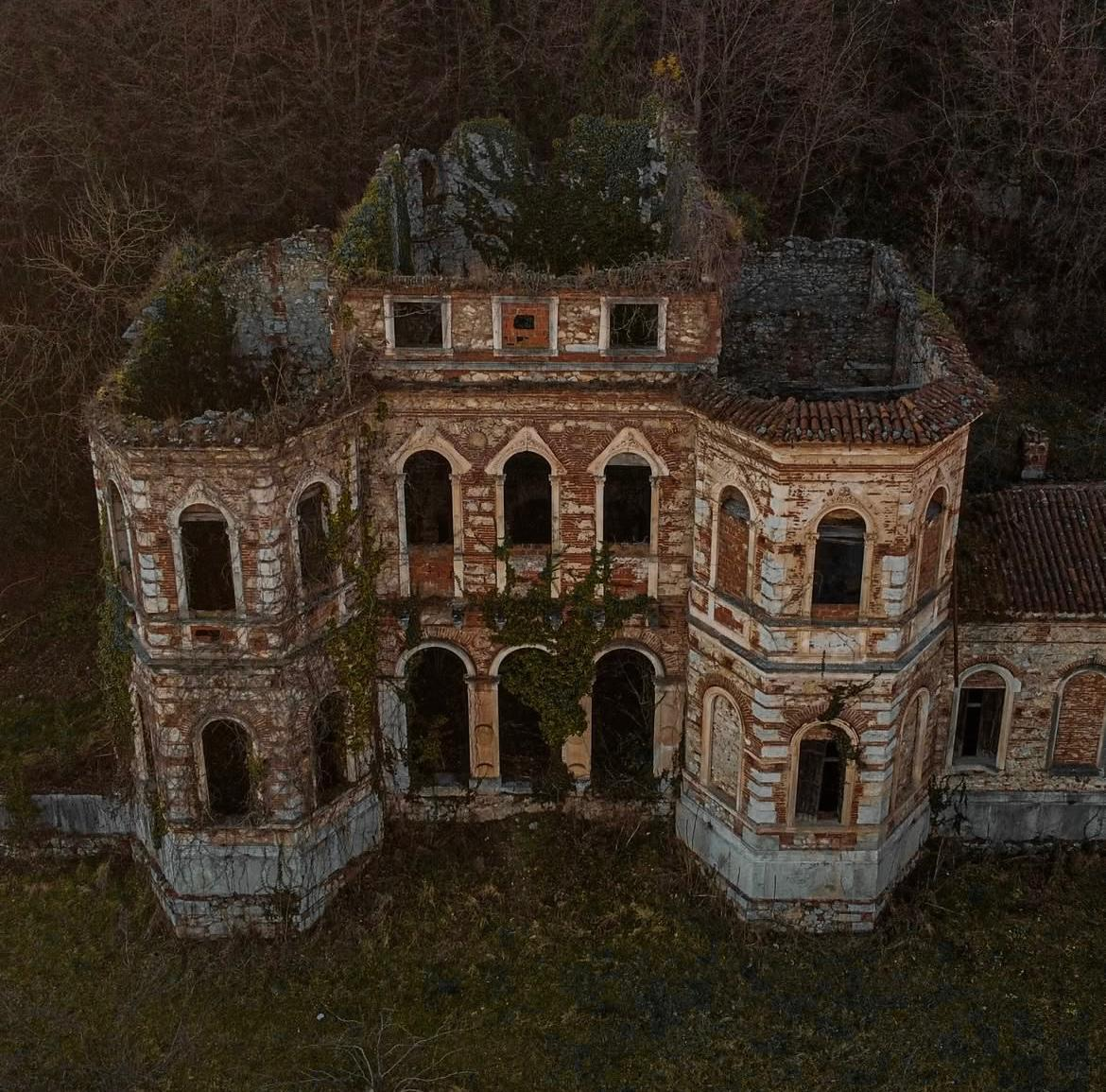
Villa Fraccaroli, Piovene Rocchette, Vincenza, Italy

=== 19th century ===
The construction of the villa was left incomplete due to unresolved family matters of the original owner. It is believed that the construction reached the roof level and that the ground floor was rendered habitable. Throughout the late 19th and early 20th centuries, Villa Fraccaroli changed hands several times. Subsequent owners were unable to allocate the necessary resources or commitment to complete the project, leaving the property with untapped potential for future developments.

The villa was sold in 1870 to Lucia Franceschi and Paolo Ballarin and later, in 1875, passed down to their son Giacomo Ballarin. In 1891 it was once again passed down to Giacomo's sons, one of whom was called Francesco Ballarin. In 1909 the villa was purchased by Filippi Antonio and Domenico whose half was later passed to his wife Margherita De Pretto. Upon their deaths the property, which had been split into different parts years before, was inherited by the Filippi brothers. The last known inheritors of only two parts of the villa were Antonio Filippi, Giuseppe Filippi, and Olivia Caterina Pojer, in 1955 and 1956.

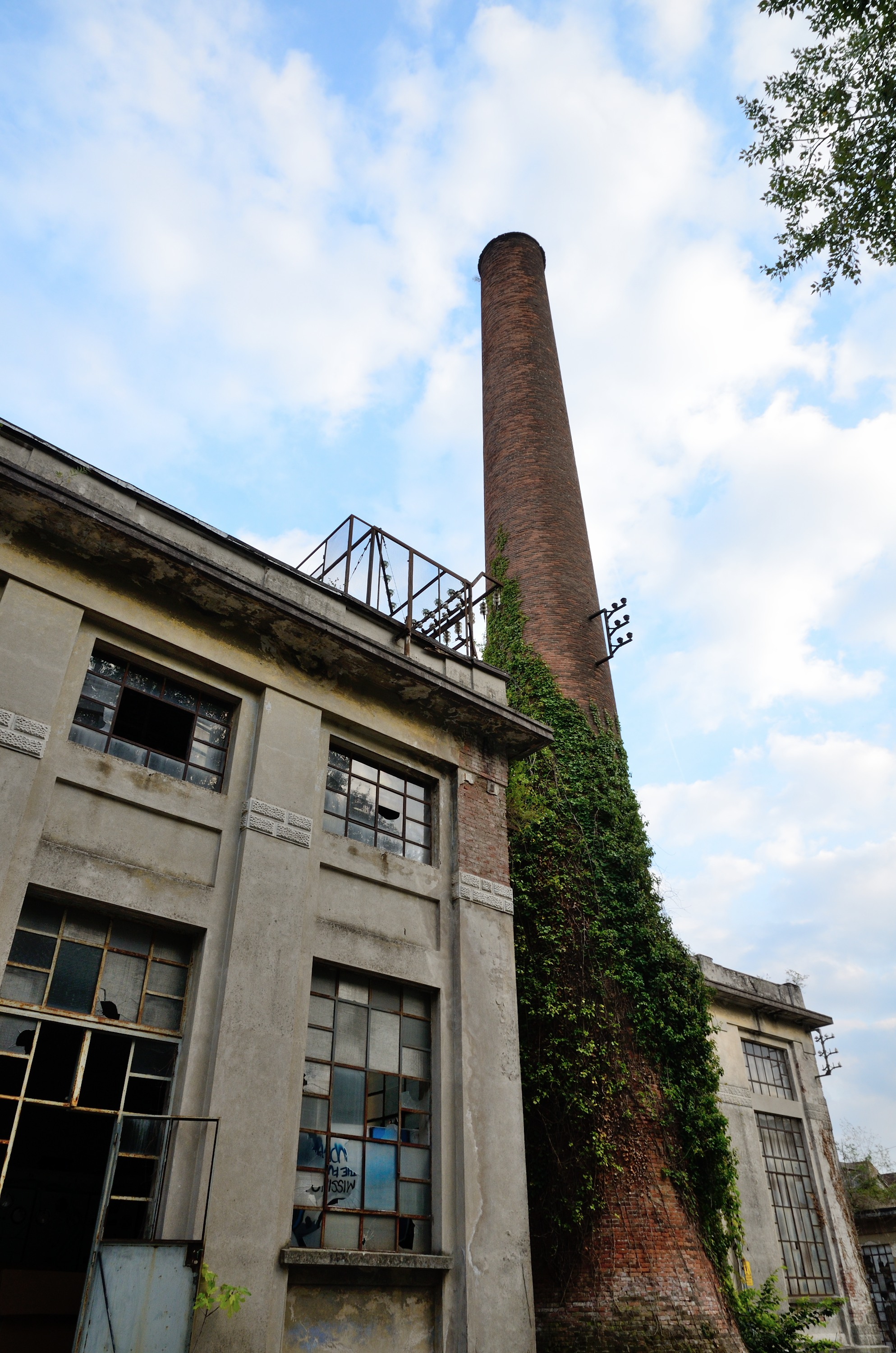
Former area of the Rossi factories after the bombing on Piovene Rocchette

=== 20th century ===
During World War I Villa Fraccaroli was used for military and logistical purposes due to its strategic location. The villa's structure provided both shelter and a high vantage point that allowed a broad view of the surrounding area. Several resources suggested that the Villa housed the wounded and became a place where soldiers saw apparitions and disturbing occurrences, increasing its reputation as a 'haunted' place.

A comparison between the villa's original design and its post-war condition reveals that multiple sections of the structure were destroyed. Piovene Rocchette's strategical position near the frontlines made it a target for bombing, which completely destroyed the building's left wing, which has never been reconstructed. This bombing also resulted in the destruction of the Rossi factories, and the evacuation of the local population.

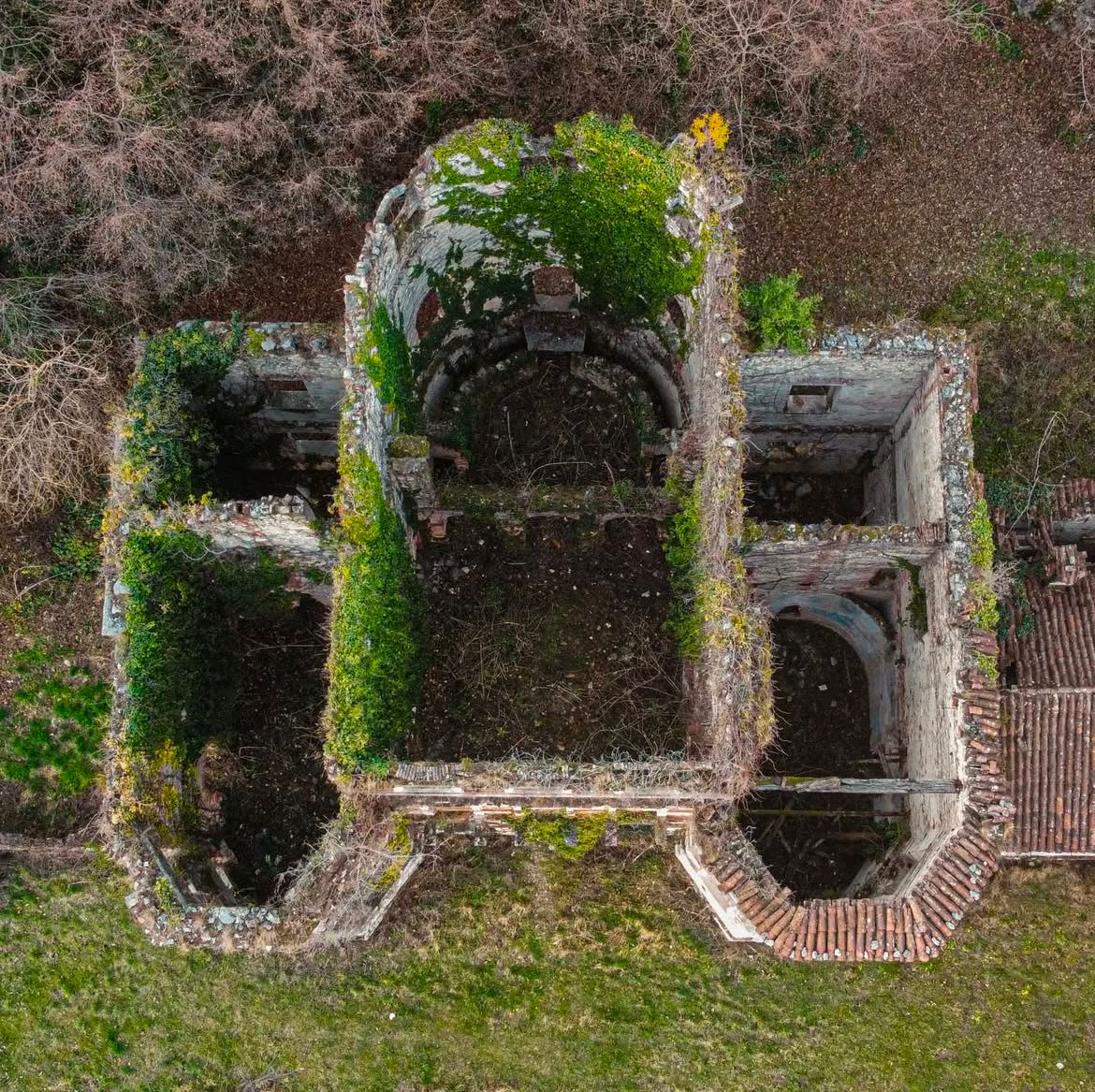
The abandoned Villa Fraccaroli, Piovene Rocchette, seen from above

=== 21st century ===
Since 2016, the villa has been recognized as one of the Places of the Heart by the Fondo per l'Ambiente Italiano (FAI, or Fund for the Italian Environment), acknowledging its cultural and historical importance. In May 2019 it was added in its list of sites for preservation and restoration efforts.

The FAI safeguards the villa by installing a gate and limiting unauthorised access, effectively protecting it from potential damage and neglect.

== Design and structure ==
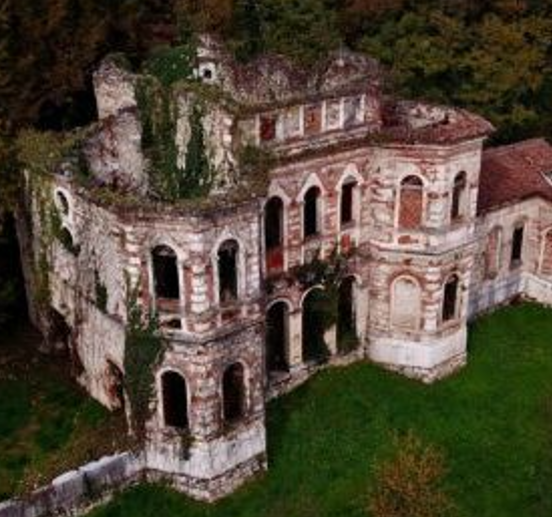
Aerial view of Villa Fraccaroli showcasing its unfinished architecture

=== Architecture ===
The architectural style of Villa Fraccaroli is based on neoclassicism, drawing inspiration from ancient Greek and Roman architecture. It was a reaction to the exuberance and ornamentation of Baroque and Rococo styles, emphasizing simplicity, symmetry, and grandeur. Neoclassicism became prominent in Europe and the Americas, influencing public buildings, private residences, and urban planning. The villa was constructed in a Neoclassical style but deliberately showcases bare brick and terracotta, it includes a blend of architectural approaches, between Neoclassical style and the Lombard style.

The Lombard style refers to architectural traditions that originated in Italy during the early medieval period, particularly within the Romanesque movement, in the 8th–12th centuries. This style is distinguished by its unique features, blending practicality and local craftsmanship with influences drawn from Roman, Byzantine, and early Christian architecture.

=== Exterior design ===
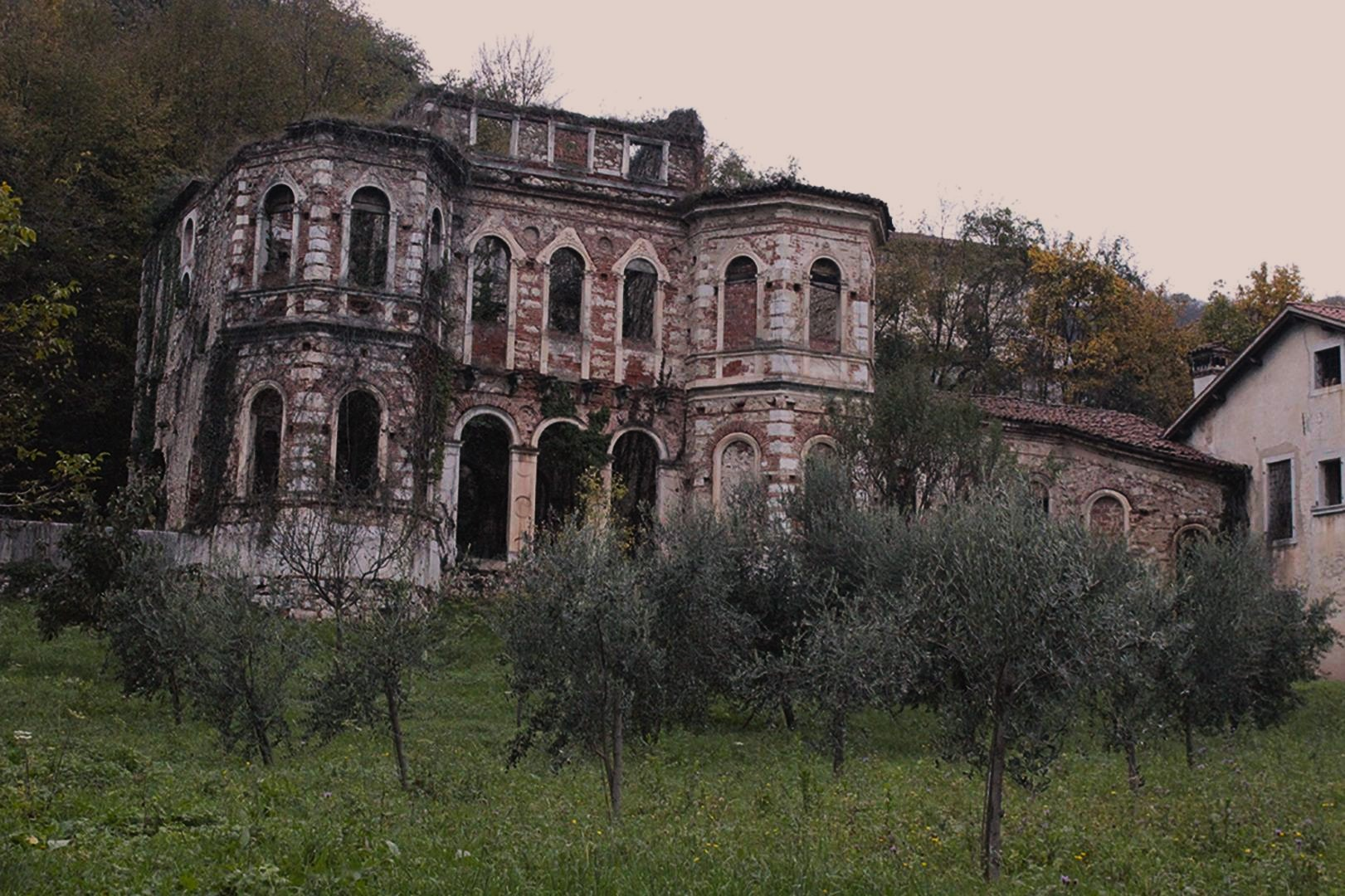
Front facade of Villa Fraccaroli, Piovene Rocchette, Italy

The Lombard style is visible in its symmetrical design, proportional elegance, and the use of classical elements such as corbels, pilasters, and arches. Originally conceived as a symbol of magnificence, the villa was designed to have three floors and two turrets, emphasizing its monumental character. A defining feature of the villa is its numerous windows on each floor, ensuring an abundance of natural light and enhancing its visual openness.

The front facade is notable for its stone corbels, positioned above the three main gate arches. These corbels support statuettes with grotesque and demonic features, which serve both a structural purpose as buttresses and a symbolic one, with interpretations varying over time from protective talismans to artistic embellishments.

=== Interior layout ===
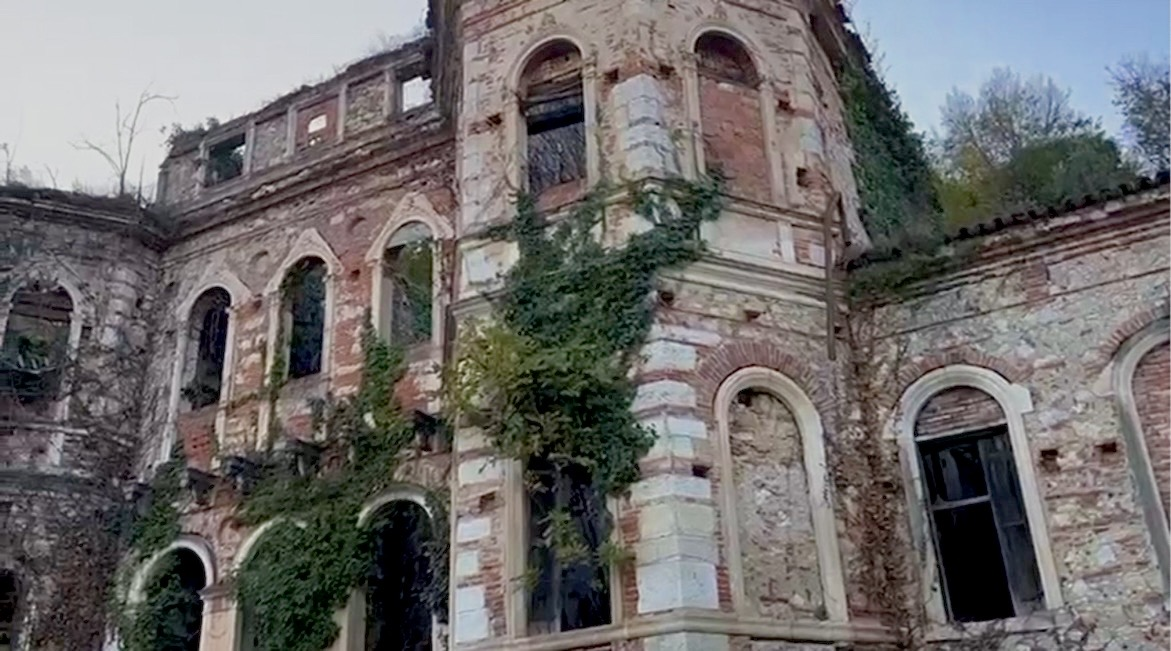
View of Villa Fraccaroli, Piovene Rocchette

The interior layout of the ground floor, the only completed level, was centered around a grand hall that connected the entrance to a rear garden-facing door. Two symmetrical polygonal rooms were situated within the turrets flanking the main entrance. These were augmented by two rectangular rooms and additional spaces featuring curved facades that extended to the sides. The staircase, crafted in a circular layout, originated at the center of the atrium and divided into two sections that ascended along the walls. The villa's width was prioritzed over depth, and ut was meant to feature and expensive front garden, which would have enhanced its visual splendor.

The second floor was intended to mirror the layout of the ground floor and serve as the primary sleeping quarters. The villa's construction materials were rough stone and terracotta that was left exposed, adhering to the architect's stylistic choice to highlight the natural textures. Window frames were ornately decorated with corner pilasters and floral motifs, while some featured brick arrangements in radial patterns, adding artistic detail.

=== Gardens ===
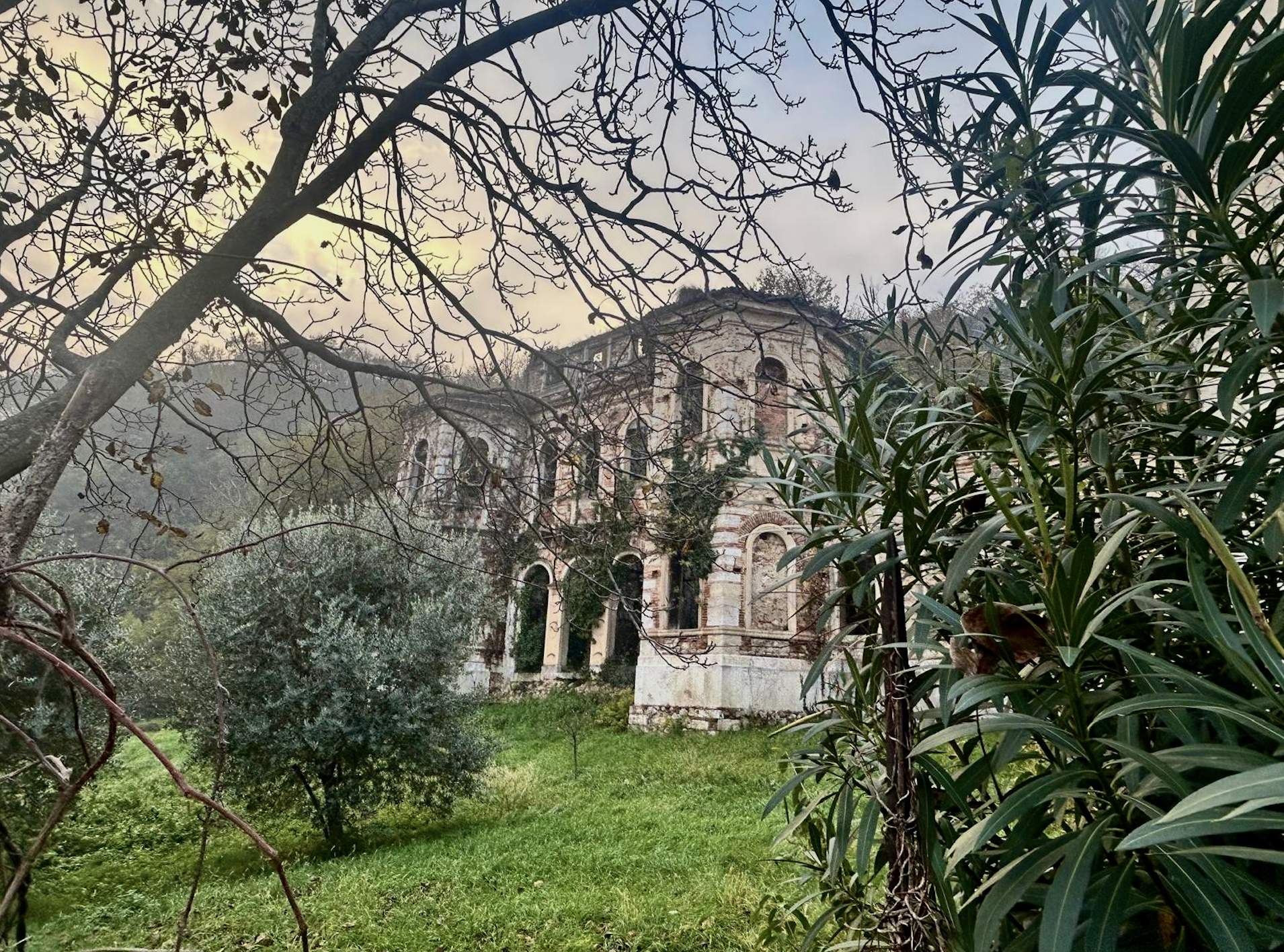
The gardens around Villa Fraccaroli, Piovene Rocchette

Villa Fraccaroli originally had a large landscaped garden, home to a variety of plant species typical of the area. The flora present in the garden is characterized by spontaneous and weedy plants. Among the species present are ivy and climbing plants that cover most of the facades of the villa. There are Robinia trees, pioneer species that spread rapidly, and Ailanthus, an invasive species that easily adapts to various environments.

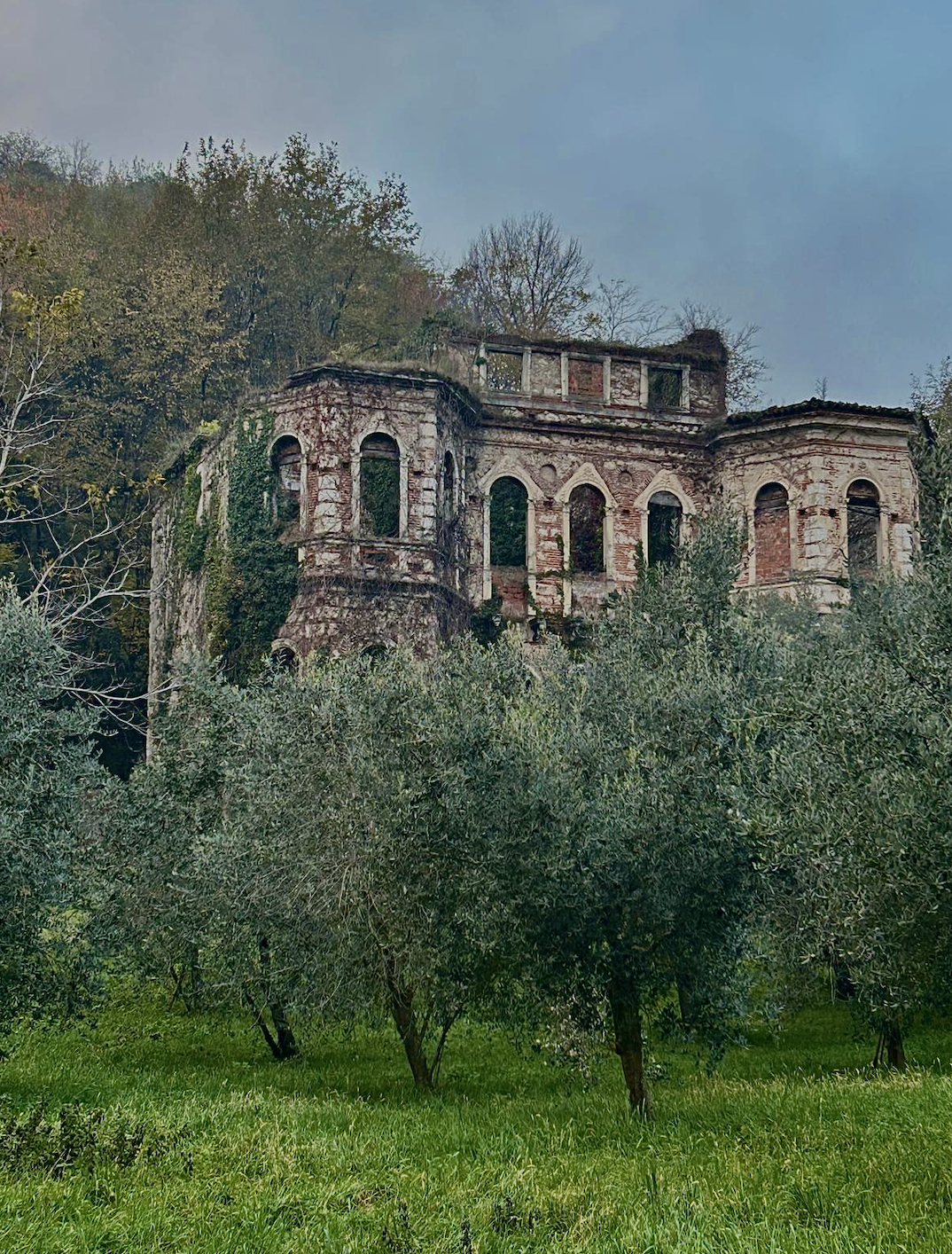
Villa Fraccaroli and abandoned gardens, Piovene Rocchette

The design of the garden at Villa Fraccaroli, given the era and the architectural style, was conceived according to the principles of the Italian garden styles. These gardens often included geometric flower beds, bordered by box hedges, ornamental trees such as cypresses and with water features as fountains and small ponds to enrich the appearance of the garden.

== Legend and mysteries ==
According to legend, Francesco Dalla Negra, Paolina Fraccaroli's husband, was fascinated by esoteric practices and intended the villa to serve as a site for studies in black magic. The villa features stone shelves supported by statues with grotesque designs. These elements served as both structural buttresses and symbolic guardians, meant to repel evil spirits. The story of a young girl, killed when struck by a beam during the villa's construction, adds to its eerie reputation. Her spirit is said to haunt the villa, searching for peace. Although the architect's design was ambitious, the villa now stands as an incomplete ruin.

Some sources suggest that Francesco's plans to dedicate the villa to dark arts were halted by his wife. Various theories attempt to explain why the villa was never completed. These include the family's relocation due to a plague epidemic, work commitments elsewhere, or preparations for the birth of a child. Nevertheless, it is said that Francesco requested talismans to be incorporated into the design to protect against malevolent spirits. Among these protective elements are the grotesque statues supporting the villa's stone shelves.

== See also ==
Similar structures:

- Villa Pisani
- Villa Carlotta
- Villa del Balbianello
- Villa Monastero
- Villa La Rotonda
- Villa Badoer
- Villa Barbaro
- Villa Cornaro
- Villa Foscari
- Villa Widmann
- Villa Della Porta Bozzolo
