= Santa Maria Maggiore, Bologna =

Church in Bologna, Italy

Coordinates: 44°29′52.9″N 11°20′31.0″E

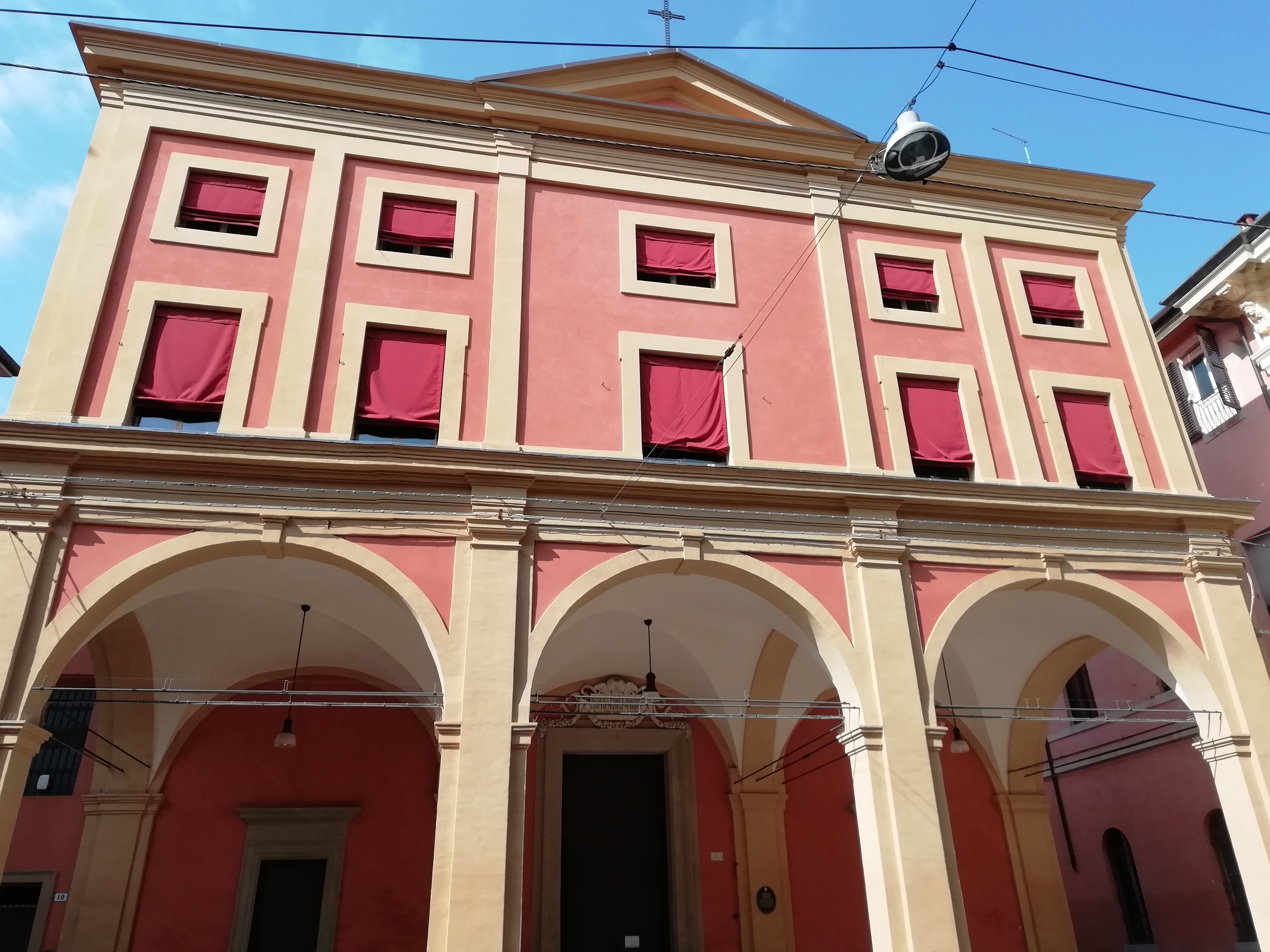

Santa Maria Maggiore is a former Collegiate, Roman Catholic church, located on Via Galliera #10 in central Bologna, Italy. It is a house over from the Palazzo Aldrovandi.

== History ==
The church arose on the site in the 5th century but was reconstructed over the centuries. The present church took shape in 1665 under designs of Paolo Canali. The interior has paintings by Orazio Samacchini, Prospero Fontana, Alessandro Tiarini, Vicenzo Spisanelli, Mauro Gandolfi, Pietro Fancelli, Jacopo Alessandro Calvi, and Alessandro Guardassoni. The chapel of the Holy Sacrament was stuccoed by A G Pio. The main altar (1749) is attributed to Alfonso Torreggiani.
