= San Rocco, Parma =

Church building in Parma, Italy

Coordinates: 44.9322°N 9.9996°E

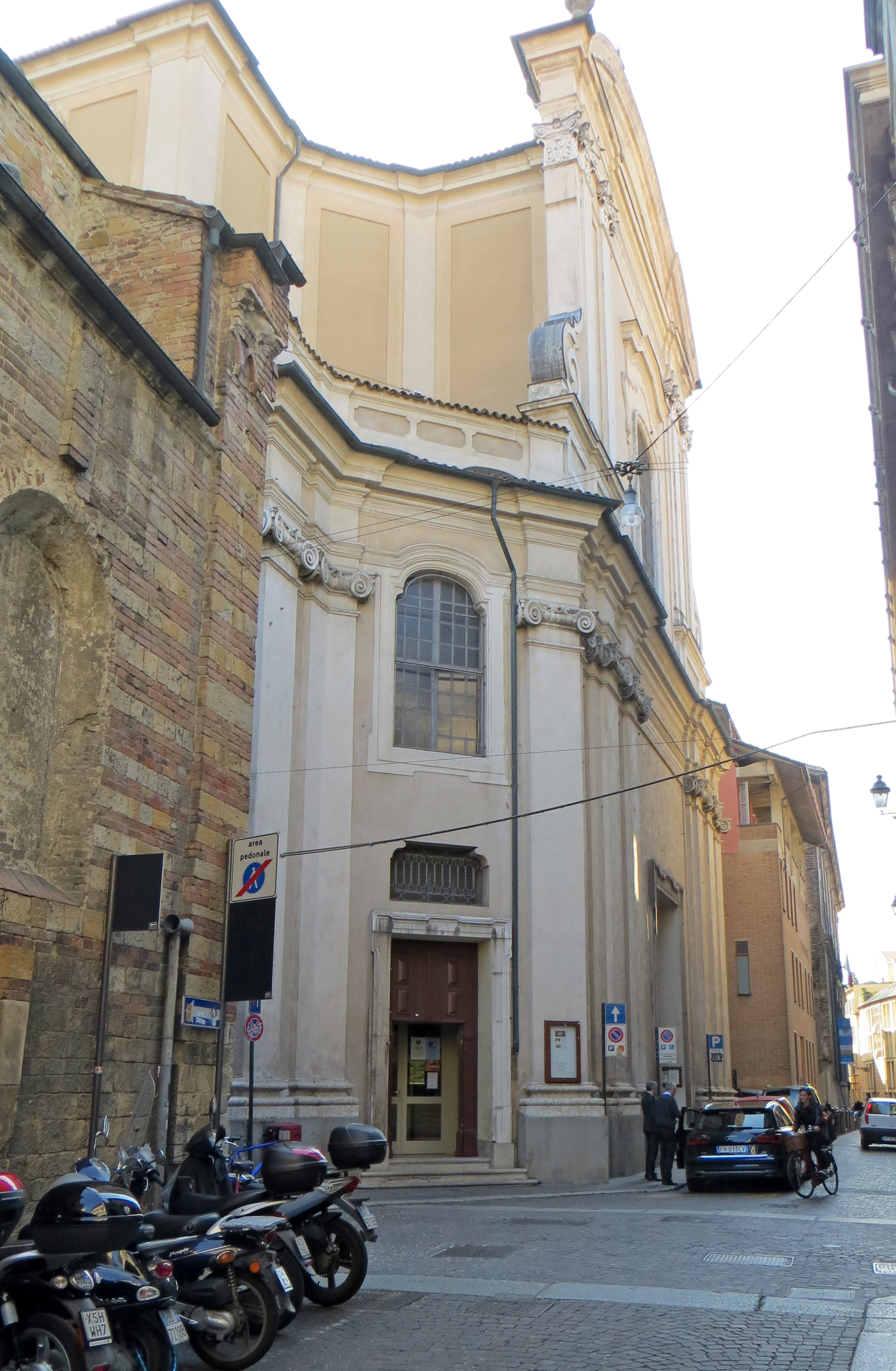
Church of San Rocco - view of the facade

The Church of Saint Roch (Italian: Chiesa di San Rocco) is a late-Baroque style, Roman Catholic church dedicated to Saint Roch located in Parma, Italy.

== History ==
Originally an oratory founded in 1528 during a plague epidemic. The site was ceded to the Jesuits, who rebuilt the church in 1754 by designs by Alfonso Torreggiani. During this reconstruction, they destroyed a prominent fresco depicting The Flagellation (1608) by Federico Zuccaro. The bell tower was added in 1747 by the architect Antonio Bettoli.

The first chapel had a canvas by Giovanni Gaibazzi. The second chapel had a St Francis Xavier baptizes infidels by Pietro Rotari; he also painted the altarpiece of St Ursula and martyrs. The main altarpiece was by Francesco Scaramuzza. To the left was a canvas of the Circumcision of Jesus by Giacinto Brandi and the funeral monument of Countess Giacinta Sanvitali di Poli attributed to Alberto Oliva. In the second chapel on the left was a St Ignatius by Lionello Spada and an Institution of the Eucharist by Calloni. The first chapel on the left was a St Louis Gonzaga and a St Filomena by Giovanni Battista Borghesi.

== See also ==
- List of Jesuit sites
