= Giovanni Battista Sangiorgi =

Italian painter

Giovanni Battista Sangiorgi (1784 in Castel Bolognese – 1877) was an Italian painter of the Neoclassical period

He trained as a figure painter, and in 1809 collaborated with Antonio Basoli in the decoration of the Teatro Comunale, Bologna. he also participated in the decorations of the Palazzo Hercolani (1818) and the Baciocchi (1822). He was named a docent for the comune of Pesaro, and was an associate member of the Bolognese Academy of Fine Arts.
