= Prospero Sarti =

Prospero Sarti (died 1904) was an Italian engineer, architect, engraver, and collector of antiquities, including a numismatist of ancient Roman coins.

== Biography ==
He was born in Budrio, province of Bologna, but lived in Rome for most of his adult life. In 1884 at Turin, he submitted a design of a work by his uncle Antonio Sarti (1797 - Rome, 1880). Prospero was also an engraver of the following views: Cathedral of Terracina; Arch of Constantine in Rome; Interior of Basilica of Santa Maria Maggiore in Rome; Interior of the Basilica di San Giovanni Laterano in Rome; Temple of Antonio e Faustina in Rome; ceiling of the Ballroom of the Palazzo del Drago in Rome. He became professor of design at the School at San Pietro in Vincoli. He was an avid collector of antiquities, especially ancient medals and coins. His extensive collection of Roman antiquities was put on sale in 1906 in Rome, with a catalogue of the art historian Ludwig Pollak: the auction was organized by the dealer Giuseppe Sangiorgi.
