= Santi Gervasio e Protasio, Budrio =

Church in Budrio, Italy

Coordinates: 44.544576°N 11.526782°E

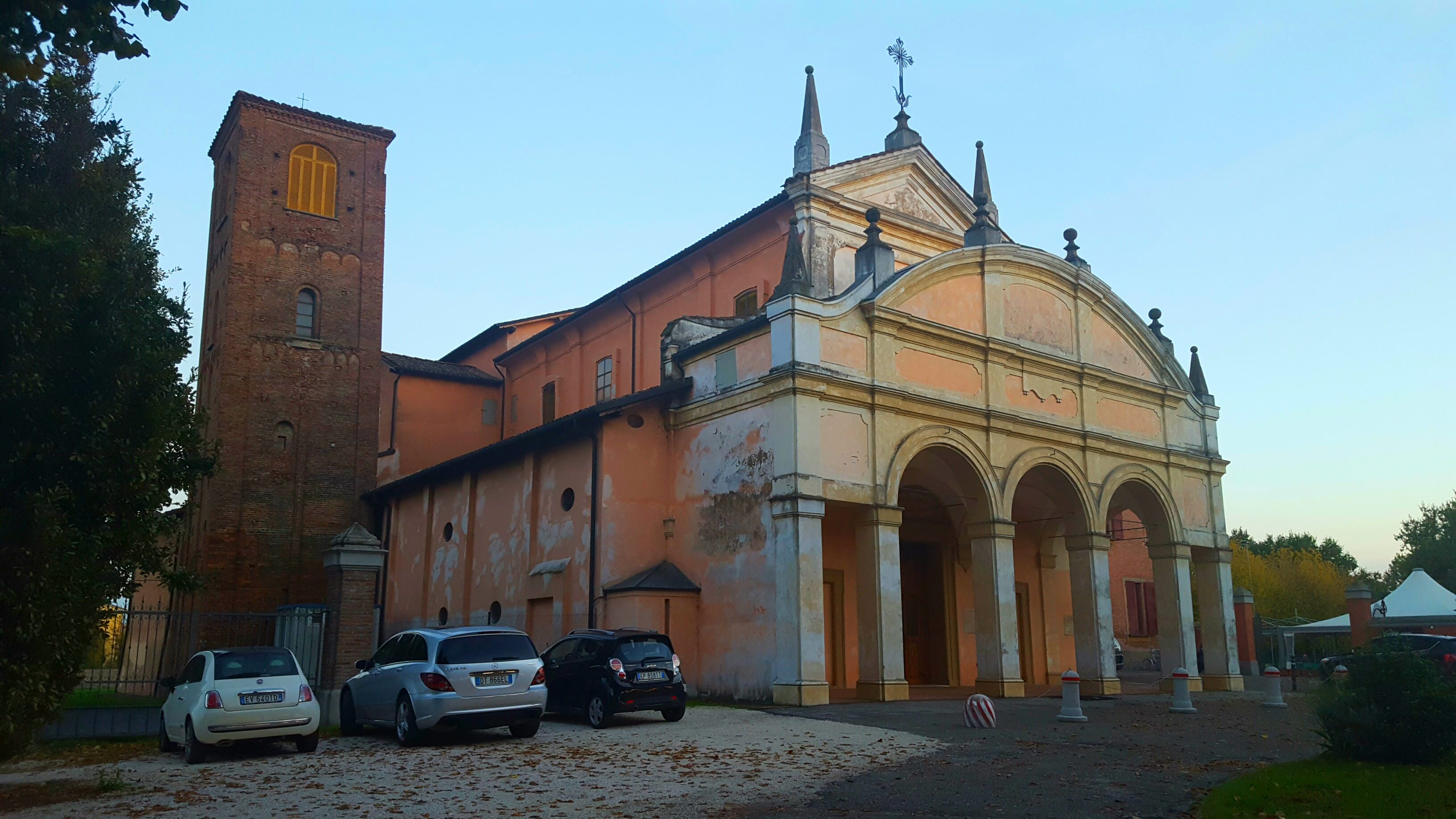
Facade and belltower of Santi Gervasio e Protasio

Santi Gervasio e Protasio is a Roman Catholic church located on Via Pieve #2, just outside of Budrio, province of Bologna, region of Emilia Romagna, Italy.

== History ==
A church at the site was present since the 5th to 8th centuries, but many subsequent reconstructions have occurred, and the present church dates mostly to the 18th-century refurbishment. Documents from 1106 mention its designation by the bishop Vittore II as pieve or parish church for the community. The church acquired the privilege to perform a baptisms in 1406. In the lower areas of the apse, some of the original church can be glimpsed.

The church is notable for housing an early Lombard Romanesque marble cross (dated 848), originally from a nearby oratory. The cross is engraved with intricate interlace designs and latin script dating it to the rule of Emperor Ludwig's son, Lothair I.

The church has a baptismal font carved from the spolia of a late-Roman capital, as well as works by the Gandolfi family and the School of Guido Reni. The main altarpiece depicts the Martyrdom of Saints Gervasio e Protasio (1727-1732) painted by Giuseppe Marchesi (il Sansone). Gervasio was martyred by flagellation, while Protasio was decapitated.
