= Pinacoteca Domenico Inzaghi, Budrio =

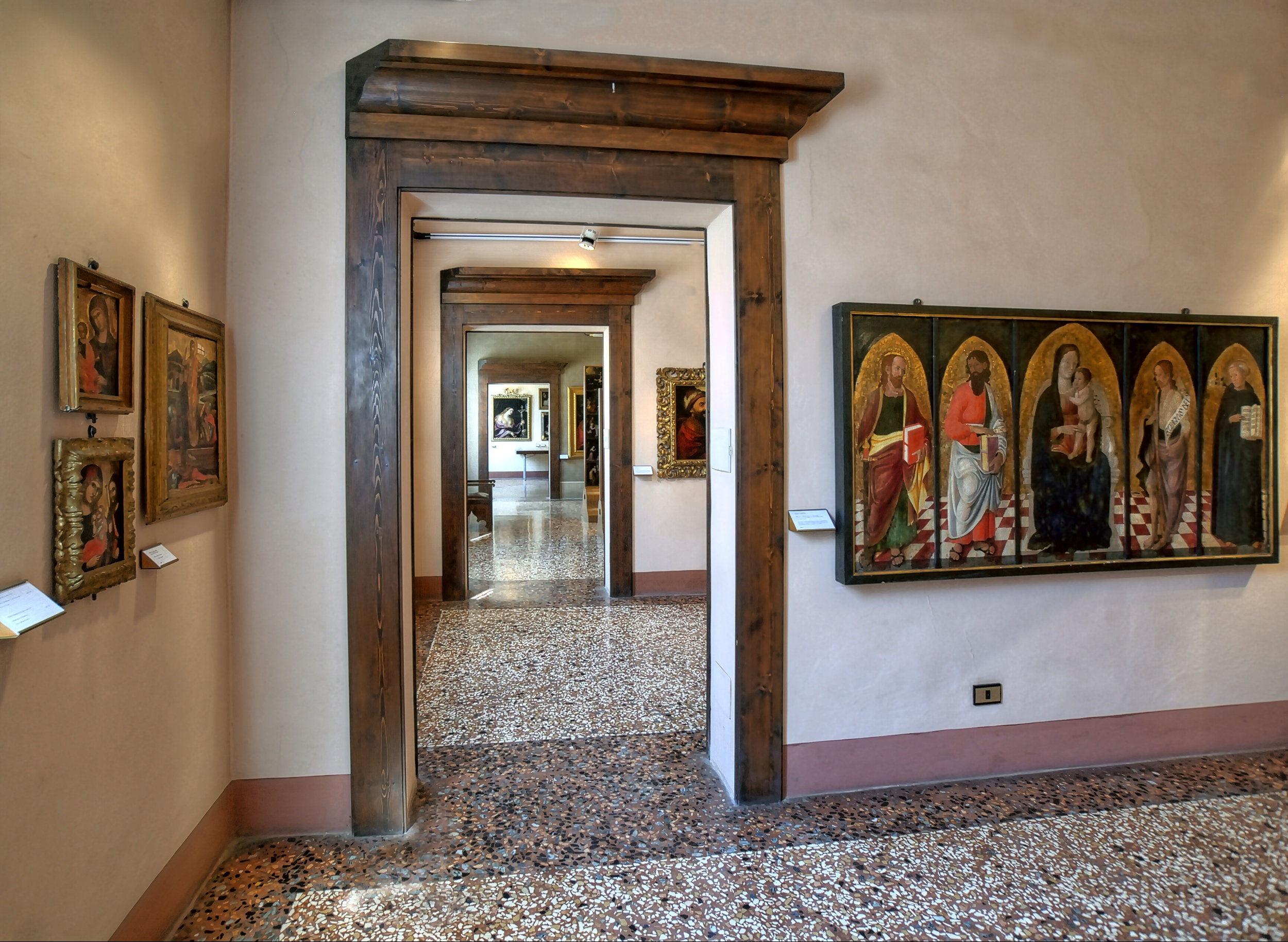
Pinacoteca civica Domenico Inzaghi

The Pinacoteca Domenico Inzaghi is an art museum, exhibiting mainly paintings and engravings, located in Palazzo della Partecipanza, Via Mentana 32, in Budrio, Italy.

Most of the collection was donated to an agrarian collective known as La Partizipanza in 1821 by Captain Domenico Inzaghi. In 1931, the collection was donated to the commune (municipality) of Budrio. The pinacoteca or painting gallery was inaugurated that year, under curation by Antonio Certani.

In 1988-1989, the museum was restructured, and the collection augmented by paintings from the Opera Pia Bianchi and the Fondazione Benni di Bologna. The paintings represent Bolognese-Emilian artists from the 14th to 18th centuries, including Vitale da Bologna, Simone dei Crocefissi, Dosso Dossi, Prospero Fontana, Lavinia Fontana, Cesare Gennari, Antonio Mezzadri, Felice Rubbiani, Simon Vouet, Tommaso Garelli, Cristoforo di Benedetto, Denis Calvaert, Bartolomeo Passerotti, Alessandro Tiarini, Mauro Gandolfi, and Antonio Ghedini; or works by or influenced by Cima da Conegliano, Francesco Francia, Dosso Dossi, Ludovico Carracci, Francesco Brizio, Guercino, or Guido Reni. They display engravings a by Francesco Curti, Vittorio Maria Bigari, Jacques Callot, and Antonio Sarti.
