= Marcello Massarenti =

Italian art collector (1817–1905)

Don Marcello Massarenti (Budrio, 1817–1905), a Vatican official who helped Pope Pius IX escape from Rome at the time of the Roman republican uprising of 1849, rose to become Almoner of the Pope. In his official position he traveled extensively and amassed a collection of Italian paintings and Roman antiquities especially during the years following the Unification of Italy, when the suppression of many monastic communities and the displacement of many aristocrats from hereditary positions brought a great number of works of art onto the market in Italy, both privately and publicly. He received an honorary knighthood from Franz Josef of Austria and was decorated with the Order of the Red Eagle of Prussia.

His private lodgings were modest, but he rented space for his gallery in Palazzo Rusticucci-Accoramboni, Rome, where he welcomed visitors. The palazzo, in the former piazza Rusticucci, was demolished by Benito Mussolini along with the rest of the spina of medieval and renaissance houses to make way for the expansive via della Conciliazione, leading to piazza San Pietro. A catalogue of the Galleria Massarenti was printed in 1881, when the prelate contemplated selling the collection to Prince Hohenlohe-Schillingsfürst at Strasbourg. At that time connoisseurship of Old Master paintings was in its infancy, and the works received highly optimistic traditional attributions. An English-language Catalogue of pictures, marbles, bronzes, antiquities... Palazzo Accoramboni (Rome: Forzani) was published in 1894, with a view to attracting prospective purchasers. The catalogue was assembled by a painter Edouard van Esbroeck, still with such wishful attributions that the catalogue cast somewhat of a temporary cloud over the collection as a whole. Joseph Duveen, his famous nephew recalled, had been less than impressed by the authenticity of the paintings, and Duveen's close associate Bernard Berenson, played an uncertain role in the sale of the collection, disparaging the attribution to Raphael of Massarenti's Madonna of the Candelbra in a letter to Isabella Stewart Gardner in 1897.

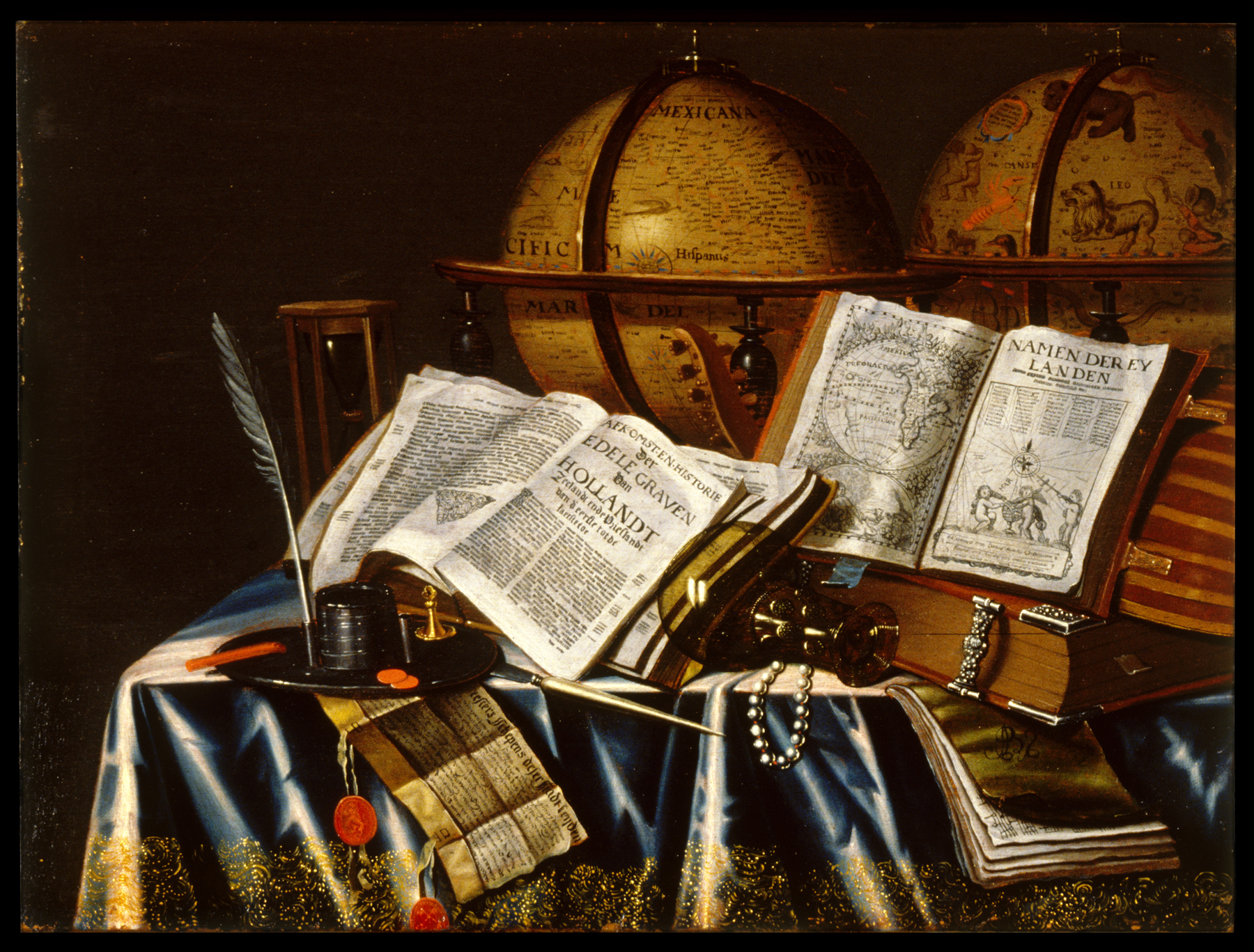
"Vanitas" Still Life, ca. 1665 by Adam Bernaert (Dutch, active ca. 1660-1669). Acquired by Henry Walters with the Massarenti Collection, 1902

The purchase en bloc in 1902 of his collection of paintings, Renaissance bronzes, Greek vases and Roman antiquities, 1700 items in all, by the American railroad magnate and established collector Henry Walters of Baltimore, Maryland, formed a nucleus of the Walters Art Museum in Baltimore. Its loss to the nation raised no protest among Italians, and was dismissively remarked upon by Wilhelm von Bode, who was informed that Walters was advised in the purchase by William M. Laffan, an owner of the New York Sun. Bode's account of Massarenti's personality was less than flattering: the man whom others would describe as affable, Bode found wily and agreeable, amassing the wealth to indulge his passion for art.

The collection, for which Europeans of the time considered Walters to have greatly overpaid, has weathered a century of close study with new, less inflated attributions, and greater confidence in their authenticity, providing the city of Baltimore with a first-rate gallery of art.
