= San Domenico del Rosario, Budrio =

Church in Budrio, Italy

Coordinates: 44°32′14.0″N 11°32′17.2″E

San Domenico del Rosario is a Baroque style church located at the end of via Marconi, on the piazza Antonio da Budrio in central Budrio, Italy.

== History ==
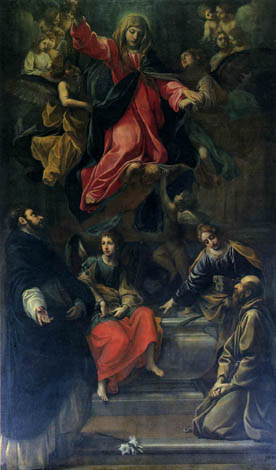
Tiarini altarpiece depicting Assumption of the Virgin

The church was built in 1605 by the Confraternity of the Most Blessed Rosary (Confraternita del SS. Rosario). In 1615 it was affiliated with Dominican order, which used adjacent buildings as a convent. With the Napoleonic invasion, the order was suppressed and the convent was used as a hospital. In recent times, the convent hosts a nursing home.

The church is notable for a portico with three arches added at the end of the 17th century with niches housing statues of St Dominic, Thomas Aquinas, Rosa of Lima, and Catherine of Alexandria. A central relief depicts the Assumption of the Virgin. The interior houses a main altarpiece depicting the Mysteries of the Rosary and the Assumption of the Virgin by Alessandro Tiarini. Other paintings include a St John the Baptist and St Peter Martyr by Francesco Albani; a St Vincent Ferrer (1765) by Ubaldo Gandolfi, a Miracle of St Domenic by Giuseppe Pedretti, and a St Rosa of Lima by Giovanni Battista Caccioli.
