= San Lorenzo, Budrio =

Church in Budrio, Italy

Coordinates: 44°32′16.6″N 11°32′07″E

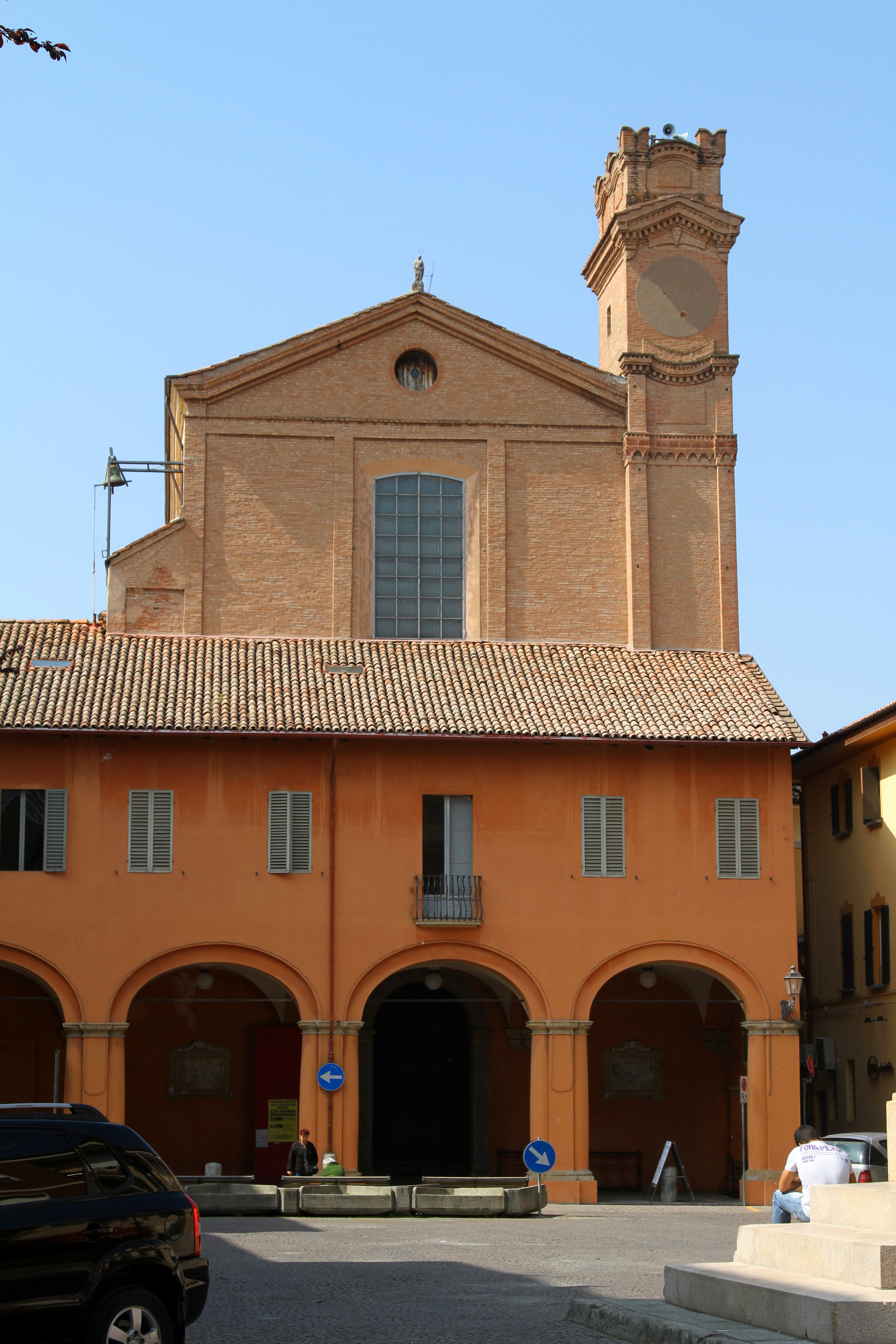
San Lorenzo and external portico

Santa Lorenzo is the main Roman Catholic parish church located in the Piazza Filopanti on Via Leonida Bissolati #66, in the center of town, across the piazza from the Palazzo Comunale of Budrio, province of Bologna, region of Emilia Romagna, Italy.

== History ==
A church of this name is documented since 1146. The structure changed over the centuries, and in 1406, it was ceded to the Servite order, who gained the privilege of baptism, and by the 1450s had built the cloister adjacent to the church. In the 17th century a new church was completed with a dome of the main chapel completed 1608–1612. In 1734–1736, Alfonso Torreggiani performed an extensive refurbishment, adding the external portico that obscures half of the facade. Later in the 18th century, the architect Giuseppe Tubertini expanded the interior.

The interior houses statues of St Sebastian and Lawrence, attributed to Filippo Scandellari. At the presbytery, the nave's barrel ceiling is supported by large free-standing Corinthian columns, designed by Giovanni Battista Canepa. Four chapels open to each flank. Among the altarpieces in the chapels are paintings by Gaetano Gandolfi (Martyrdom of St Lawrence); Giovanni Andrea Donducci (Christ consigns keys to St Peter); Pietro Fancelli; and other artists of the Bolognese Baroque school. The wooden pulpit was guilt in 1578. A Polychrome sculpture of the Madonna Addolorata was completed by Filippo Scandellari. The organ dates to the mid-19th century.
