= Valeria Buldini =

Italian model

- Modeling information
- Height: 178 cm (5 ft 10 in)
- Hair color: blonde
- Eye color: blue
- Agency: Elite (Paris), Elite (Milan), Society Management (New York), Elite (London)

Valeria Buldini is an Italian model. She won the Elite Model Look Italy competition in 2017 at the age of 15.

== Early life and career ==
Valeria Buldini was born in Budrio the province of Bologna to a Russian mother and an Italian father. After she won the Elite Model Look Italy competition and ranking in the top 15 for the world final, she made her debut on the catwalk for Prada. For the F/W 20 season she walked for the Philosophy di Lorenzo. Buldini also closed the Dolce & Gabbana couture show in Puglia. In 2024 she appeared on the cover of Vogue Italia.

Vogue Italia named her one of the 7 girls who represent Italy.
