= Palazzo Aldrovandi, Bologna =

Coordinates: 44°29′50.8″N 11°20′30.5″E

Palazzo Aldrovandi
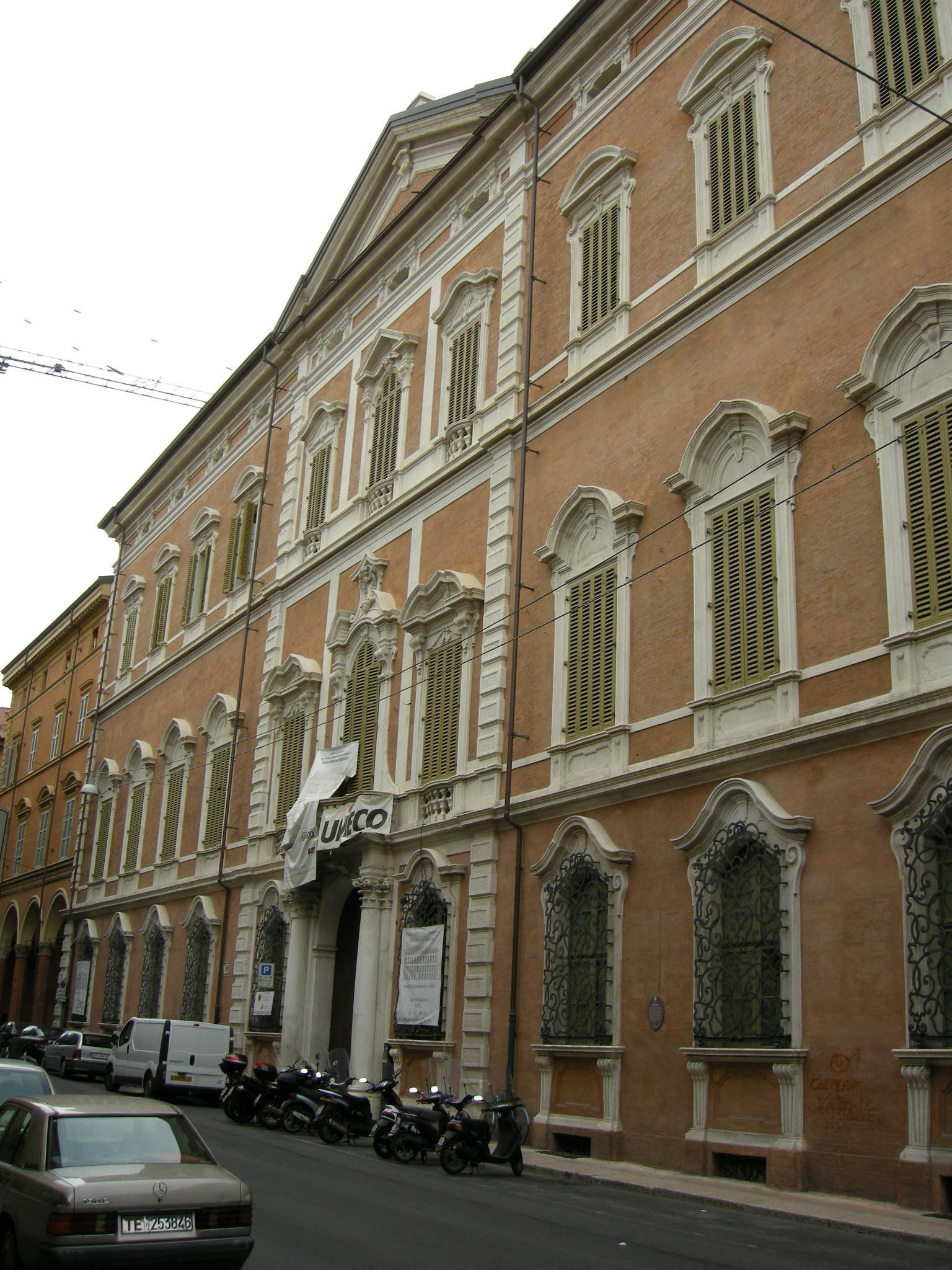
- Interactive map of the Palazzo Aldrovandi area

General information
- Architectural style: Rococo
- Location: Bologna, Italy, Bologna
- Groundbreaking: 1725

Design and construction
- Architect: Alfonso Torreggiani

The Palazzo Aldovrandi is a Senatorial palace on Via Galliera 8 in Bologna, built in Rococo style.

== History ==
Replacing an older construction, the palace we see today began in 1725 under the patronage of the Cardinal Pompeo Aldrovandi with plans commissioned from Franco Maria Angelini. After Angelini's death in 1731, the work, including the Rococo facade, ornamented with Istrian marble, continued by 1741 under Alfonso Torreggiani. He designed the palaces ornate and peculiar Rococo windows with almost undulating arches superiorly. The palace lacks the typical porticos seen in older Bolognes palaces.

One house over on Via Galliera 4, the Palazzo Torfanini has a Renaissance architecture ground arcade, but a piano nobile refurbished with windows by the same architect Torreggiani. Further down the street on Via Galliera 10 is the church of Santa Maria Maggiore.

The cardinal's once large art collection mainly made its way to the National Gallery of London. The library was dispersed by the middle of the 19th century. In the 19th century the Aldrovandi family had a majolica factory in a section of the palace. The interior contains the frescoes of Stefano Orlandi and Vittorio Maria Bigari. The grand entry staircase is particularly notable. The palace changed hands in the 19th century to the Montanari family.
