= Palazzo Torfanini, Bologna =

Palace in Bologna, Italy

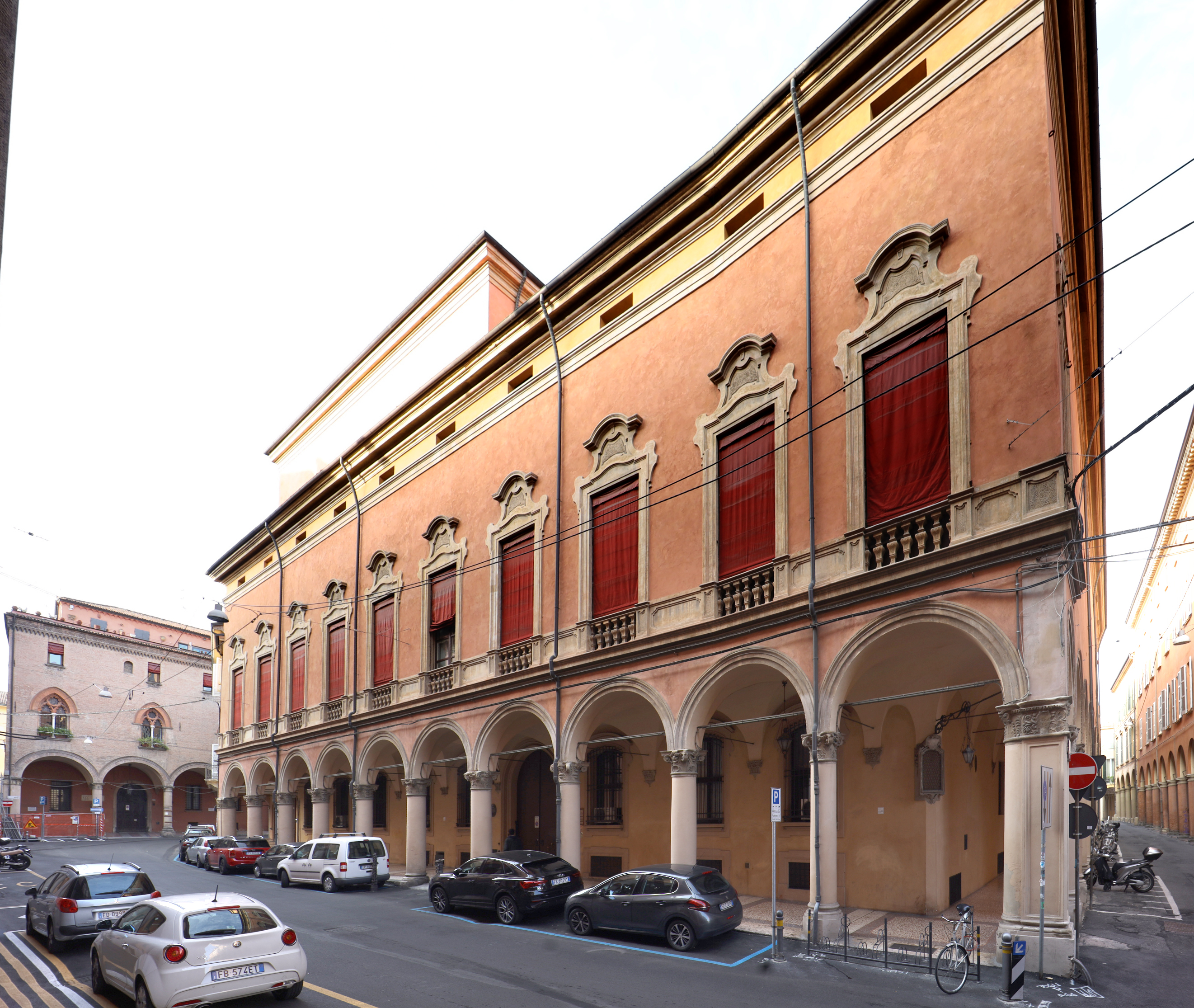
Palazzo Torfanini

The Palazzo Torfanini is a Renaissance architecture palace located on Via Galliera 4, in central Bologna. It is located near the Palazzo Aldrovandi. The palace, with typical facade arcades, was commissioned by Bartolomeo Torfanini in 1544.

The interiors were frescoed in 1549 by Nicolo dell'Abate. The exterior fresco work by Girolamo da Treviso and Prospero Fontana has long decayed. In 1732, the palace was refurbished by Alfonso Torreggiani for the Princesses Benedetta and Amalia d'Este of Modena. His contribution is noted in the window frames of the piano nobile.

The Abate frescoes were destroyed by Torregiani's reconstruction. The art collector Giacomo Bartolomeo Beccari asked the painter Domenico Fratta to copy the frieze and frescoes, however these copies were stolen from the Institute of Science of Bologna where they were kept. A copy of the copies were made for Giovanni Battista Venturi, and these were rediscovered in 1929 in the Biblioteca Comunale of Reggio Emilia.

Freedburg describes these much praised depiction of historical scenes of ancient Rome and scenes from Orlando Furioso as paintings where he depicted romantic landscapes, battle scenes, and most notably, musical parties of aristocratic contemporaries, of genre-like intimacy and arresting charm... in these works, he became an explicit example of Maniera style.
