= Palazzo Belloni, Bologna =

Coordinates: 44.4928°N 11.3366°E

The Palazzo Belloni is a palace located on Via de' Gombruti #13 in central Bologna, region of Emilia-Romagna, Italy.

== History ==
The palace is best known for hosting the James III Stuart, the Old Pretender, as he made way in 1717 for permanent exile in Rome. The exterior of the palace, which lacks a portico, is not distinctive. The grand staircase, designed by Giuseppe Antonio Torri, was decorated with frescoes for the Stuart Pretender. The statues of Hercules and Orpheus were by Andrea Ferreri. In the past, the palace housed paintings by Giovanni Gioseffo dal Sole, Giovanni Girolamo Bonesi, Giovanni Antonio Burrini, and Giacinto Garofalini.
