= Palazzo Ranuzzi =

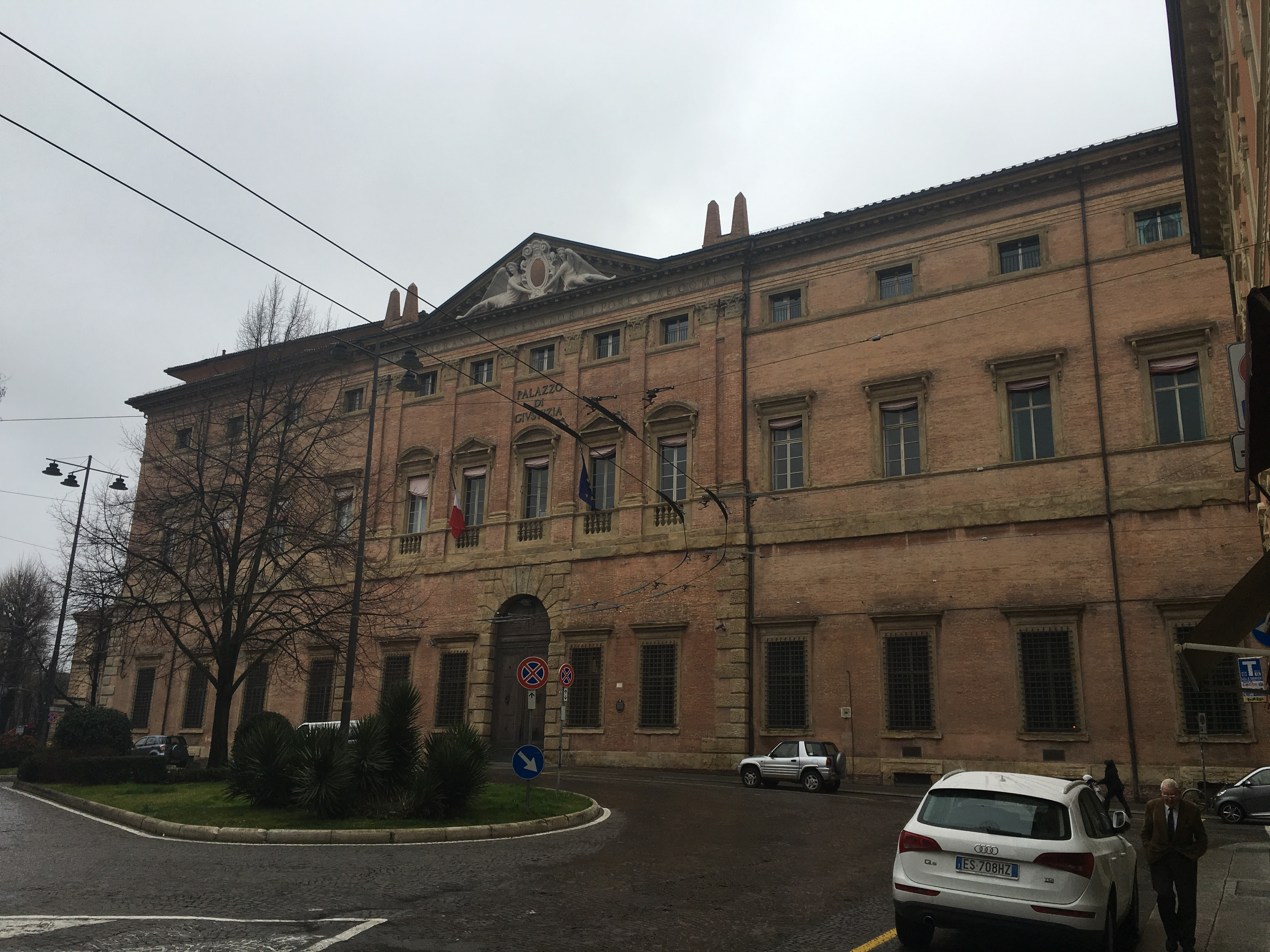
- Facade
- Interactive map of the Palazzo Ranuzzi area

General information
- Location: Bologna, Italy, Bologna
- Construction started: 1650s

The Palazzo Ranuzzi, also called Palazzo Baciocchi or Palazzo Ruini, is a Baroque style palace in central Bologna. It is now houses the Court of Appeal of Bologna.

The palace was built in the late-1500s, commissioned by the academic and lawyer Carlo Ruini. The palace was extensively rebuilt by the Ranuzzi family, owners from 1679 to 1822, and later by Prince Felice Baciocchi, husband of Elisa Bonaparte, sister of Napoleon, and briefly grand-duchess of Tuscany. The city of Bologna bought the palace in 1873, and converted it to use by the courts.

Some attribute the original designs to an inspiration, if not plan, by Andrea Palladio, with the scenic Rococo entrance stairs by Giuseppe Antonio Torri and Giovanni Battista Piacentini. The palace contains statuary by Filippo Balugani. The interior decoration includes works by Ferdinando Galli-Bibiena and Giuseppe Maria Mazza. Frescoes were completed in various rooms by painters including Marco Antonio Franceschini, Giuseppe and Antonio Rolli, Vittorio Bigari, Antonio Basoli, Felice Giani, Giovanni Battista Sangiorgi, and Pelagio Palagi. A major restoration was completed in 1993.

Photo di Paolo Monti, 1975

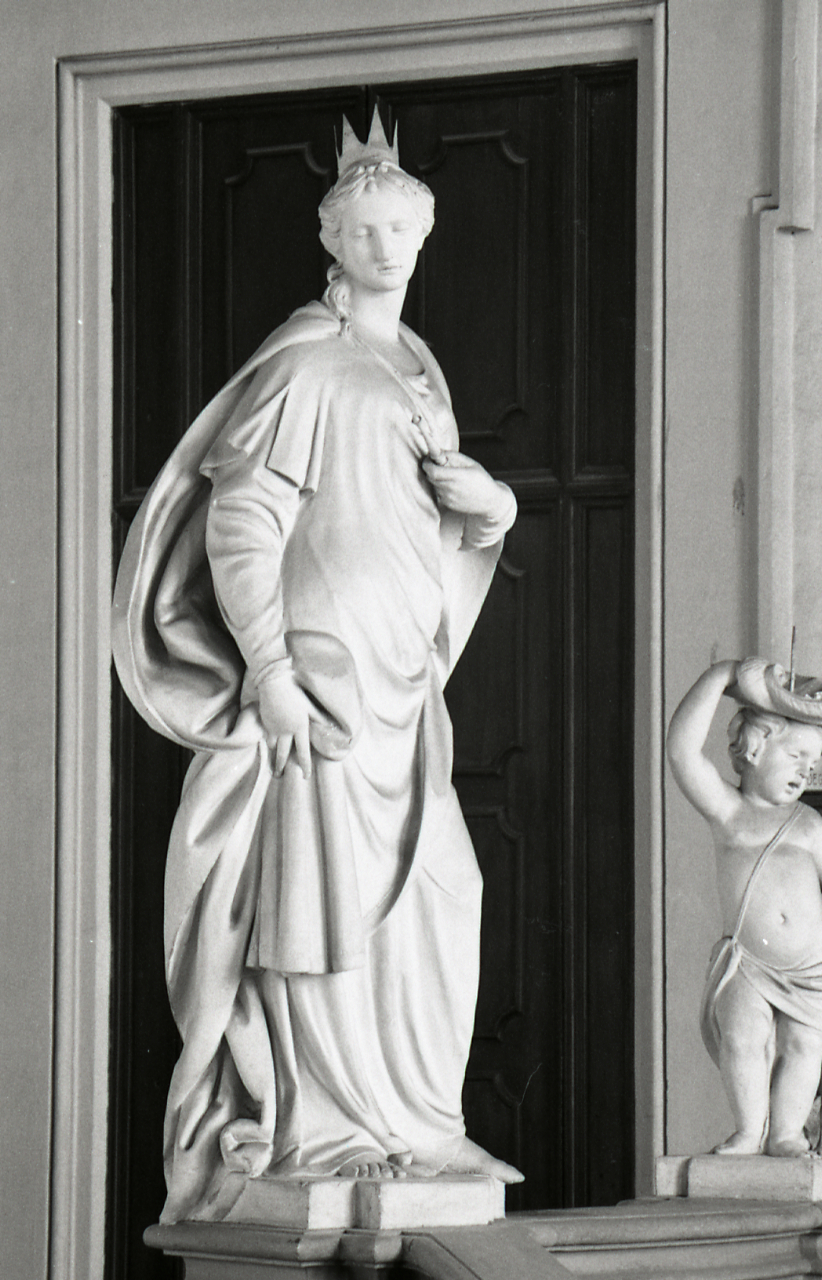
17th-century sculpture

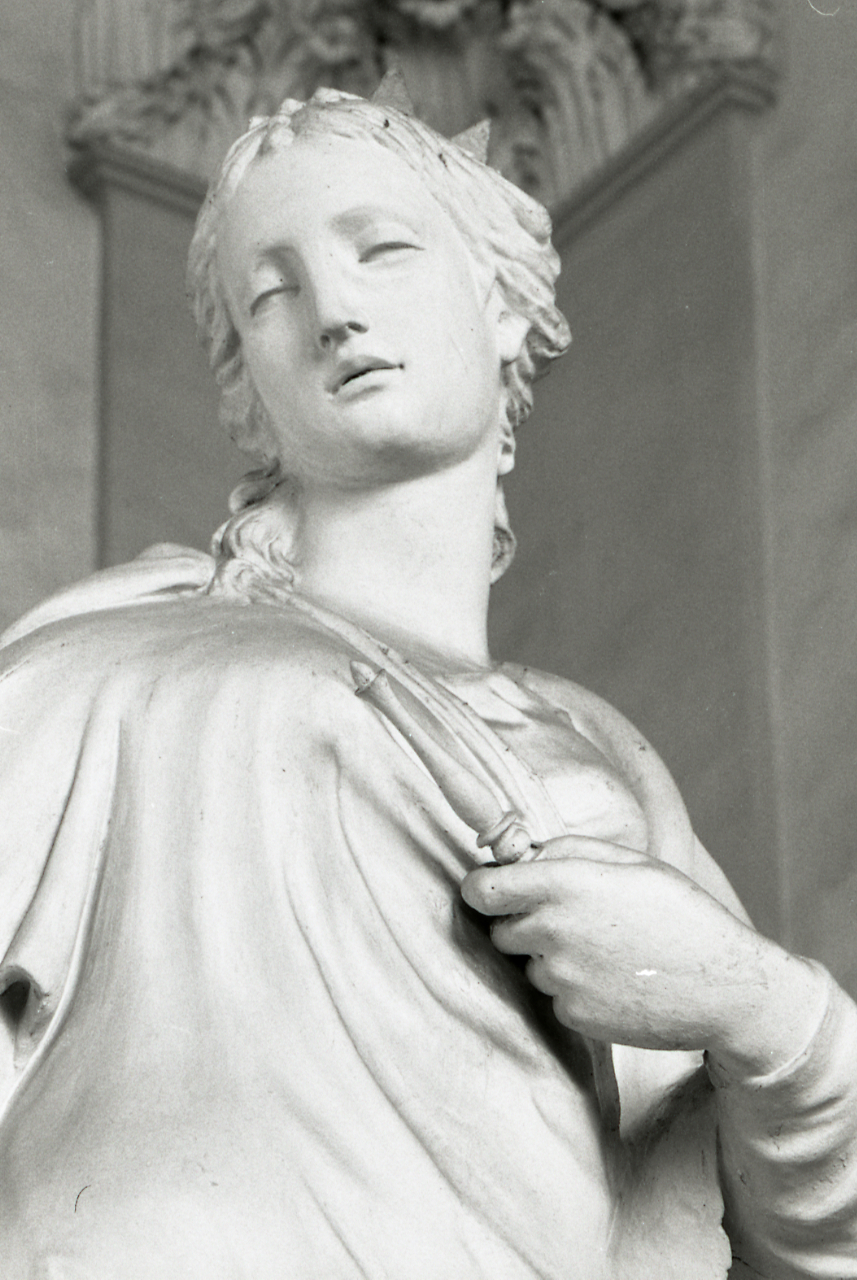
17th-century sculpture

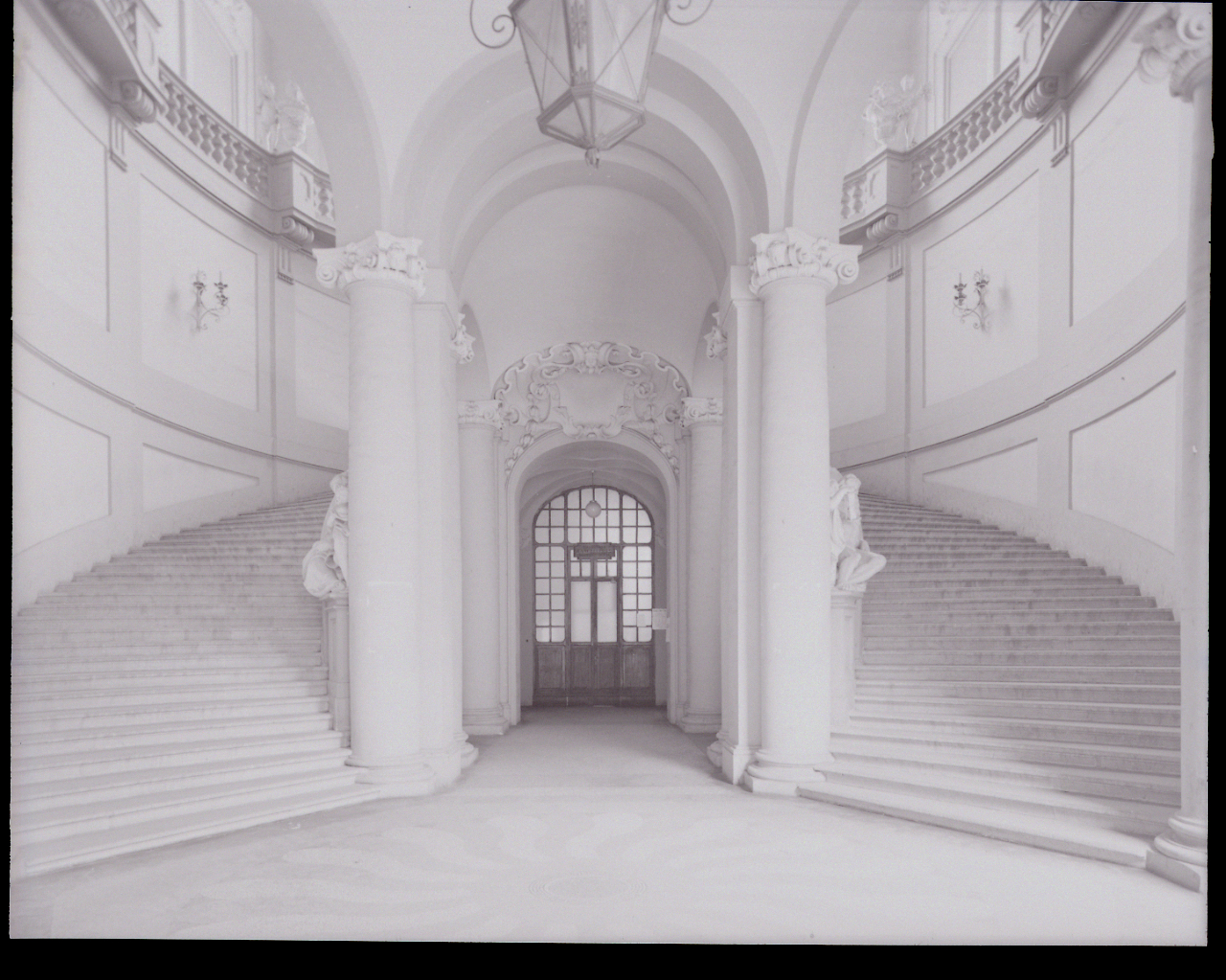
Staircase
