= Giuseppe Antonio Torri =

Italian architect

Giuseppe Antonio Torri (1655 – c. 1713) was an Italian architect of the early 18th century. He was born and died in Bologna, where he was active in a late-Baroque style.

His surname is also spelled Tórri. He initially trained with his father, Giovanni Battista. On 30 March 1697 he was appointed architect to the Senate of Bologna.

He worked on the designs used to reconstruct the Collegio Germanico-Ungarico (1700), now a seminary. He helped design the building's interior courtyard. In 1703, he designed the present building for the parish church of San Tommaso dal Mercate, which was completed by Giovanni Antonio Taruffi. He is said to have invented machinery (trafila, 1710) for the mint at Bologna; and helped with the building of the astronomical observatory at the University of Bologna. Other buildings in Bologna to which he contributed include the church of San Gabriele (begun 1700, finished 1720), the palazzo San Giorgio (1709), the church of San Domenico in Modena (1708). He contributed some designs for the church of the Santissima Trinita that had been begun by F. Martini in 1662. He also contributed some plans, at a distance, for a palazzo that William III of England contemplated. The building presently housing the Court of Appeals in Bologna, the Palazzo Baciocchi, previously Ranuzzi, has a grand staircase designed by Torri. He also contributed to reconstructions and modernizations at Palazzo Scarani, Palazzo Isolani de San Stefano, and Palazzo Pepoli Campogrande. Among his pupils was Alfonso Torreggiani.

== Sources ==
- Entry in Treccani Enciclopedia
- The dictionary of architecture, Volumes 7-8 By Architectural Publication Society, Page 71.
