= Gaetano Alemani =

Italian painter

Gaetano Alemani (or Alamanni; 1728 - 14 December 1782) was an Italian painter, active mainly in Bologna in the architectural and ornamental painting (quadratura) for the decoration of churches and theatres, as well as a scenic designer.

== Biography ==
Born in Bologna, he was a pupil of Stefano Orlandi and Mauro Tesi. Among his works are decorations at the Chapel of the Nativity of the Virgin in San Biago, Bologna; the main chapel of the archiepiscopal church of Pizzocalvo; the altar of San Rocco in San Petronio in Bologna, decorations in the Church delle Grazie; scenes for the Theater of the College of San Luigi, Teatro Zagnoni, and the Public Theater in 1763, 1778, and 1782; ceilings in casa Corbici of Forlì; scenes painted alongside Vincenzo Martinelli for the Teatro comunale inaugurated in 1775; frescoed quadratura for villa Ercolani della Crocetta, and a large number of decorations (1779) for the church of the Carmine in Forlì. He became a member of the Accademia Clementina.

One source states Gaetano learned scenic design with Antonio Bibiena.

== Sources ==
- Bryan, Michael (1886). Robert Edmund Graves (ed.). Dictionary of Painters and Engravers, Biographical and Critical. Vol. I A-K. London: George Bell and Sons. p. 17.
