= Paolo Ballarini =

Italian painter

- Born: 10 October 1712; Bologna, Papal States
- Died: Unknown
- Known for: painter
- Style: landscape painting

Paolo Ballarini (10 October 1712 – ?) was an Italian painter, mainly of landscapes.

Ballarini was born in Bologna. He first studied painting under Francesco Monti, then he studied architecture under Stefano Orlandi, and finally, he studied quadratura painting under Ferdinando Galli Bibiena. He painted rooms for a convent in Bagnacavallo, traveled to Venice, and painted in Trieste. From 1736 to 1739 he lived and worked in Vienna.

Ballarini returned to Bologna with Giuseppe Galli Bibiena to decorate the Malvessi Theatre with ornamental painting. Then in Venice, he painted in houses of Pederzani and Grighenti. He also spent some years painting in St Petersburg, Russia.
