= Budrio =

- Comune
- Comune di Budrio
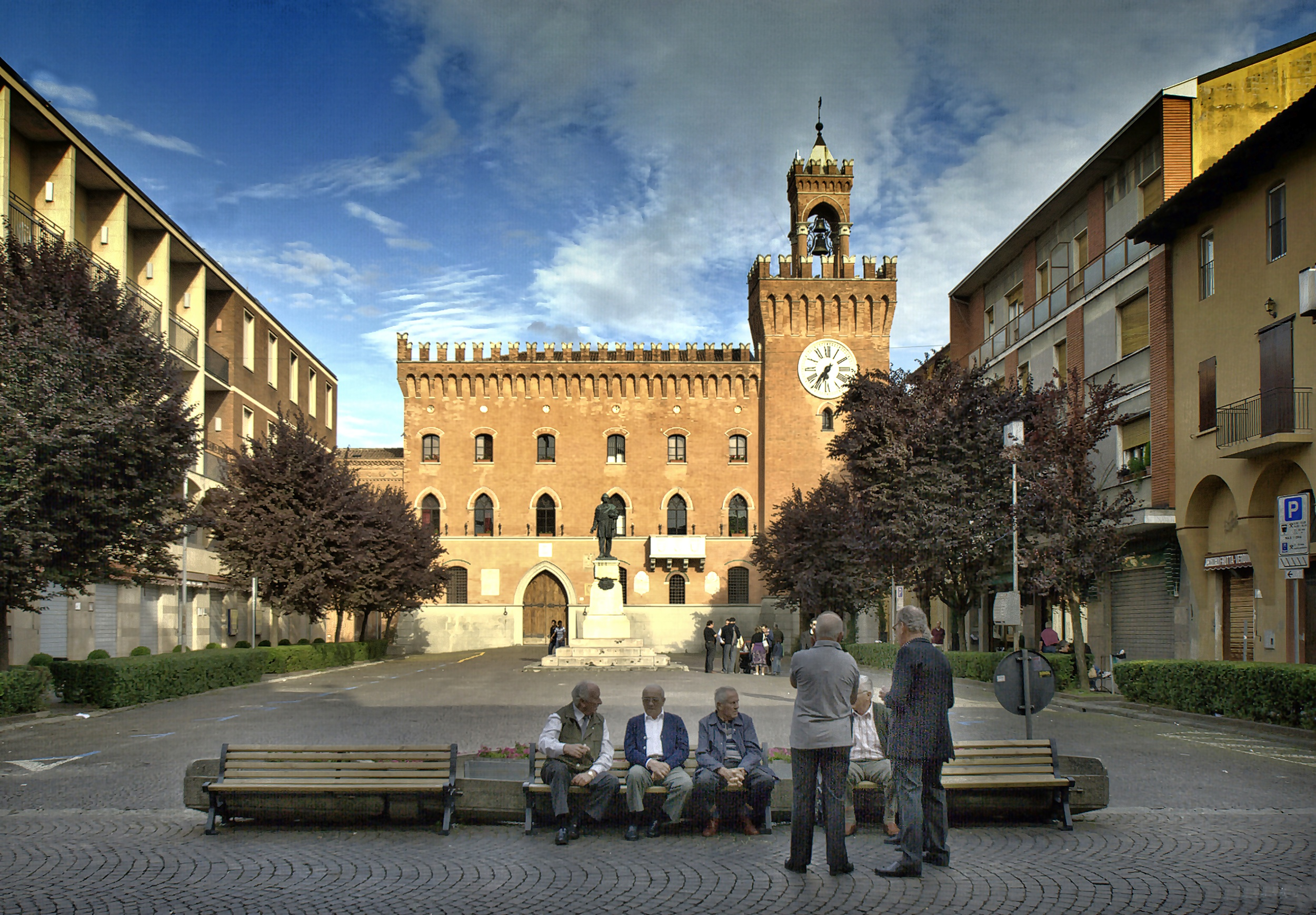
- Piazza Quirico Filopanti with the town hall in the background.

- Location within Italy Location within Emilia-Romagna
- Coordinates: 44°33′N 11°32′E
- Country: Italy
- Region: Emilia-Romagna
- Metropolitan city: Bologna (BO)
- Frazioni: Armarolo, Bagnarola, Cento, Dugliolo, Maddalena di Cazzano, Mezzolara, Prunaro, Riccardina, Vedrana, Vigorso

Government
  - Mayor: Maurizio Mazzanti

Area
  - Total: 120.19 km^{2} (46.41 sq mi)
- Elevation: 26 m (85 ft)

Population (28 February 2017)
  - Total: 18,479
  - Density: 153.75/km^{2} (398.21/sq mi)
- Demonym: Budriesi
- Time zone: UTC+1 (CET)
  - Summer (DST): UTC+2 (CEST)
- Postal code: 40054
- Dialing code: 051
- Patron saint: St. Lawrence
- Saint day: August 10
- Website: Official website

Budrio (Eastern Bolognese: Bûdri) is a town and comune in the Metropolitan City of Bologna, in Emilia-Romagna, Italy; it is 15 kilometres (9 mi) east of Bologna.

== History ==
The area around Budrio was a Roman colony, whose territory was divided between veteran legionaries. The current town was however founded in the 10th-11th centuries AD. The church of San Lorenzo was already active in 1146. In the 14th century Cardinal Gil de Albornoz rebuilt it as a castle, of which the two large towers (1376) can still be seen, while of the walls only a small section remains.

== Main sights ==
The most notable attraction are the Bentivoglio castle (16th century) and the Villa Ranuzzi Cospi at Bagnarola. The town also houses an art gallery- Pinacoteca Domenico Inzaghi- and the churches of San Domenico del Rosario, San Lorenzo, and Santi Gervasio e Protasio.

== Notable people ==
Budrio is the birthplace of Giuseppe Barilli, better known under his pseudonym of Quirico Filopanti, an Italian mathematician and politician.

- Valeria Buldini, model
- Giuseppe Donati, inventor of the ocarina
- Pierpaolo Donati, sociologist and philosopher of social science
- Gustavo Fiorini, retired footballer
- Marcello Massarenti, papal almoner (Vatican official)
- Prospero Sarti, engineer, architect, engraver, and collector of antiquities
- Laura Zuccheri, comics artist, illustrator, and painter.

== Sister cities ==
- Gyula, Hungary, since 1965
- Eichenau, Germany, since 1991
