= Vittorio Bigari =

Italian painter (1692–1776)

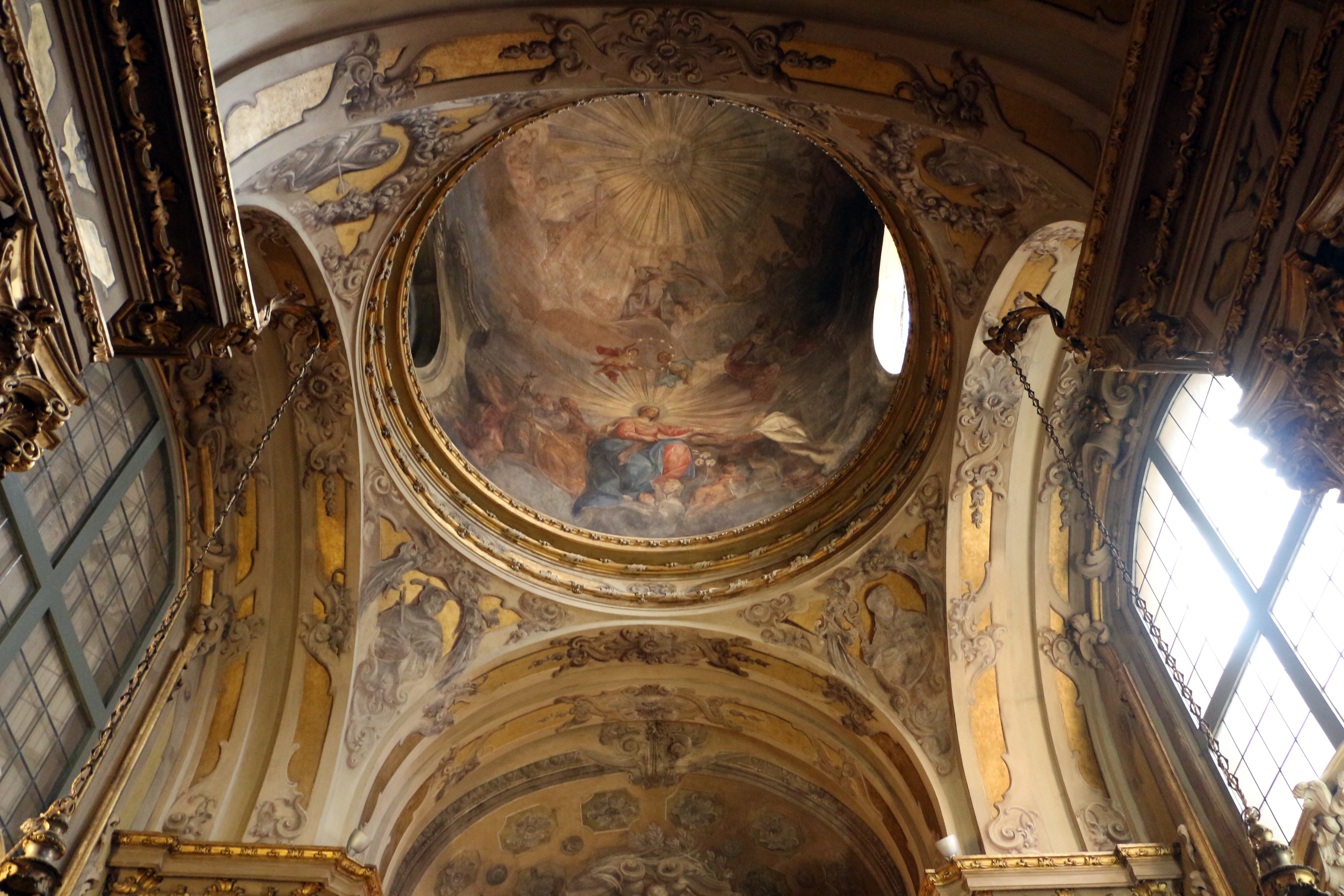
San Martino, Bologna, Carmine Chapel, frescoes by Vittorio Bigari

Vittorio Bigari (1692 – 1776) was an Italian painter of the late-Baroque period.

== Biography ==
He was born in Bologna in 1692. His main biographer was Zanotti. He was initially trained in the art of stucco and sculpture, a pupil of Antonio Dardani; then became an assistant to the scenographer C. A. Buffagnotti, with whom he combined the activity of quadraturist scenographer with the study of the figure.

In 1720 Bigari worked with A. Buttazzoni on the decoration (now disappeared) of the choir of the church of San Nicolò in Carpi; two years later he painted in Rimini the ceiling of the choir of the church of San Agostino (two angels detached are in the Municipal Museum of Rimini). Also in 1722 began his work for the counts Aldrovandi of Bologna: in the palace (now Montanari) of via Galliera, in collaboration with the quadraturista Stefano Orlandi, he helped decorate the ceiling of the staircase and a room with the mythological tale of Aurora Abandons the Old Titone. Following the success of these works, Bigari was commissioned to paint the Allegories of the Baths of Porretta on the content of the poet P.I. Martelli in the vault of the gallery of Palazzo Ranuzzi (now Palazzo di Giustizia of Bologna). (in the collaboration with Orlandi). The admiration received for these works earned Bigari the admission (1727) to the Accademia Clementina.

Also in 1727, together with Orlandi, Bigari was invited by Manfredi to Faenza to decorate the ceilings of three large rooms and the palace gallery (now a municipal palace) with monochrome and polychrome frescoes dedicated to the Sun, the Stars, Rose and the Facts of Roman History.

In the same period and in the same city, according to Zanotti, he painted an Assumption the chapel of the Bartoli house, which was destroyed in the Second World War. Zanotti attributed to the period after Faenza the vast and not happy tempera with Apollo who Leads the Virtues to the Temple of Gloria in the Aldrovandi palace in Bologna; an Immaculate Conception, today in the church of St. Eugenio Papa of Bologna, must be considered of these years.

The last important works of Bigari were the frescoes for the main chapel of the sanctuary of the Madonna di San Luca in Bologna (1760) and for the vaults of some rooms of the Renata di Francia palace in Ferrara. These works of maturity are characterized by the obvious Venetian ways, for a warmer and more intense brushstroke.

He painted frescoes in the Basilica of San Domenico in Bologna, as well as the cupola of the church of the Madonna della Guardia, and the gallery of the Ranuzzi Palace in Bologna. He also painted in the Palazzo Aldrovandi. He also painted for the Madonna del Soccorso. The Pinacoteca Nazionale di Bologna includes two paintings by him: Convito di Baldassarre and Salomone incensa gli idoli. Followers or pupils of Bigari include Francesco Gadi, Francesco Chiozzi, and Emilio Manfredi.

In 1759 Bigari was again elected viceprincipe and later, twice (years 1767 and 1773), prince of the Accademia Clementina. In 1770, he was elected an honorary associate of the Russian Imperial Academy of Arts.

Bigari died in Bologna on 17 June 1776 and on 21 June he was buried in the chapel of the Santi Sebastiano and Rocco; the plaque on his tomb recalled the numerous honors he had: a cabinet painter of the archbishop of Cologne, a member of the Academy of Parma, etc.
