= Palazzo Reale (Genoa) =

Palace in Genoa, Italy

Royal Palace of Genoa
- Palazzo Reale di Genova
- View of the Palace
- Former names: Palazzo Stefano Balbi

General information
- Status: now used as a museum, National Gallery
- Type: Palace
- Location: Genoa, Italy, Via Balbi, 10
- Coordinates: 44.414861°N 8.926194°E
- Construction started: 1618
- Completed: 1655
- Client: Balbi family, Durazzo family, House of Savoy

Website
- www.palazzorealegenova.beniculturali.it

UNESCO World Heritage Site
- Official name: Palazzo Reale di Genova - Genoa: Le Strade Nuove and the system of the Palazzi dei Rolli
- Type: Cultural
- Criteria: ii, iv
- Designated: 2006 (30th session)
- Reference no.: 1211
- Region: Europe

The Palazzo Reale (Royal Palace) or Palazzo Stefano Balbi is a major palace in Genoa.

== History ==
Construction of the present structure began in 1618 for the Balbi family. From 1643 to 1655, work renewed under the direction of the architects Pier Francesco Cantone and Michele Moncino. In 1677, the palace was sold to the Durazzo family, who enlarged the palace under the designs of Carlo Fontana.

In 1823, the palace was sold to the Royal House of Savoy. From 1919, the palace has belonged to the state.

== Decor ==
The palace contains much original furniture and decoration. Frescoes inside include the Glory of the Balbi Family by Valerio Castello and Andrea Sghizzi, Spring changing slowly to Winter by Angelo Michele Colonna and Agostino Mitelli, and Jove establishes Justice on the Earth by Giovanni Battista Carlone. It also contains canvases by Bernardo Strozzi, il Grechetto, Giovanni Battista Gaulli, Domenico Fiasella as well as Bassano, Tintoretto, Luca Giordano, Anthony van Dyck, Ferdinand Voet, and Guercino. It contains statuary by Filippo Parodi.

=== Gallery ===
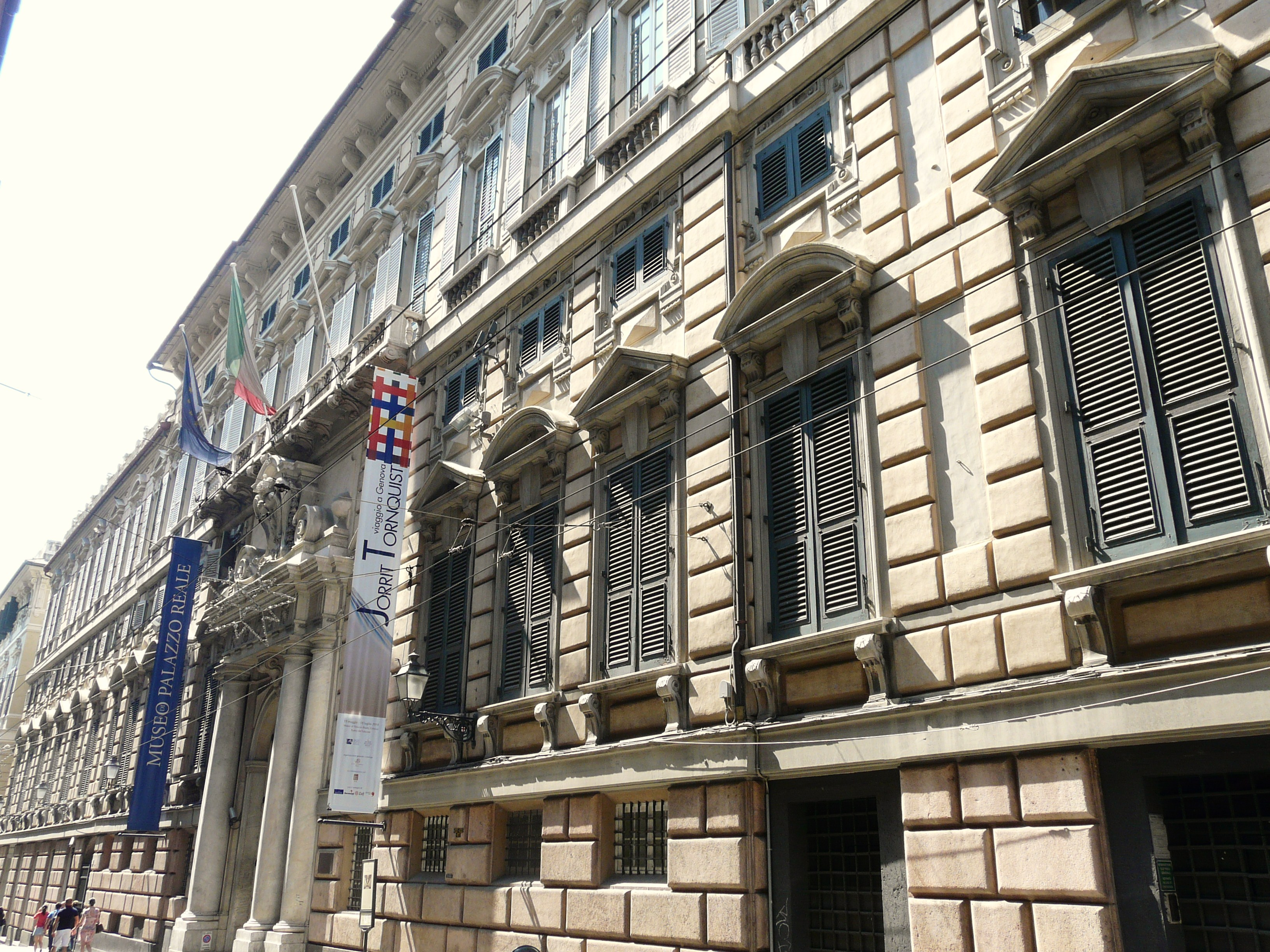
Main facade of the palace

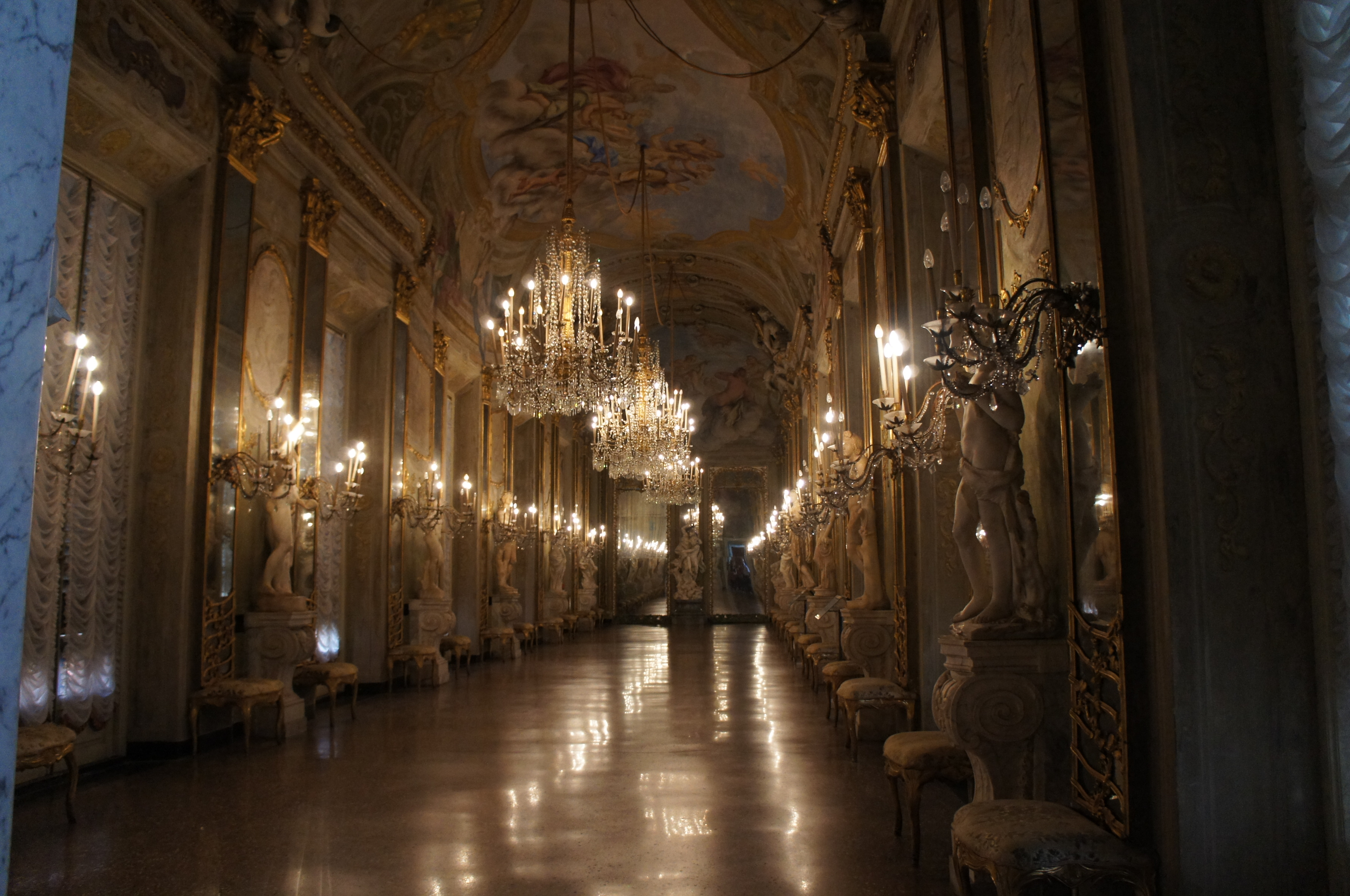
Galleria

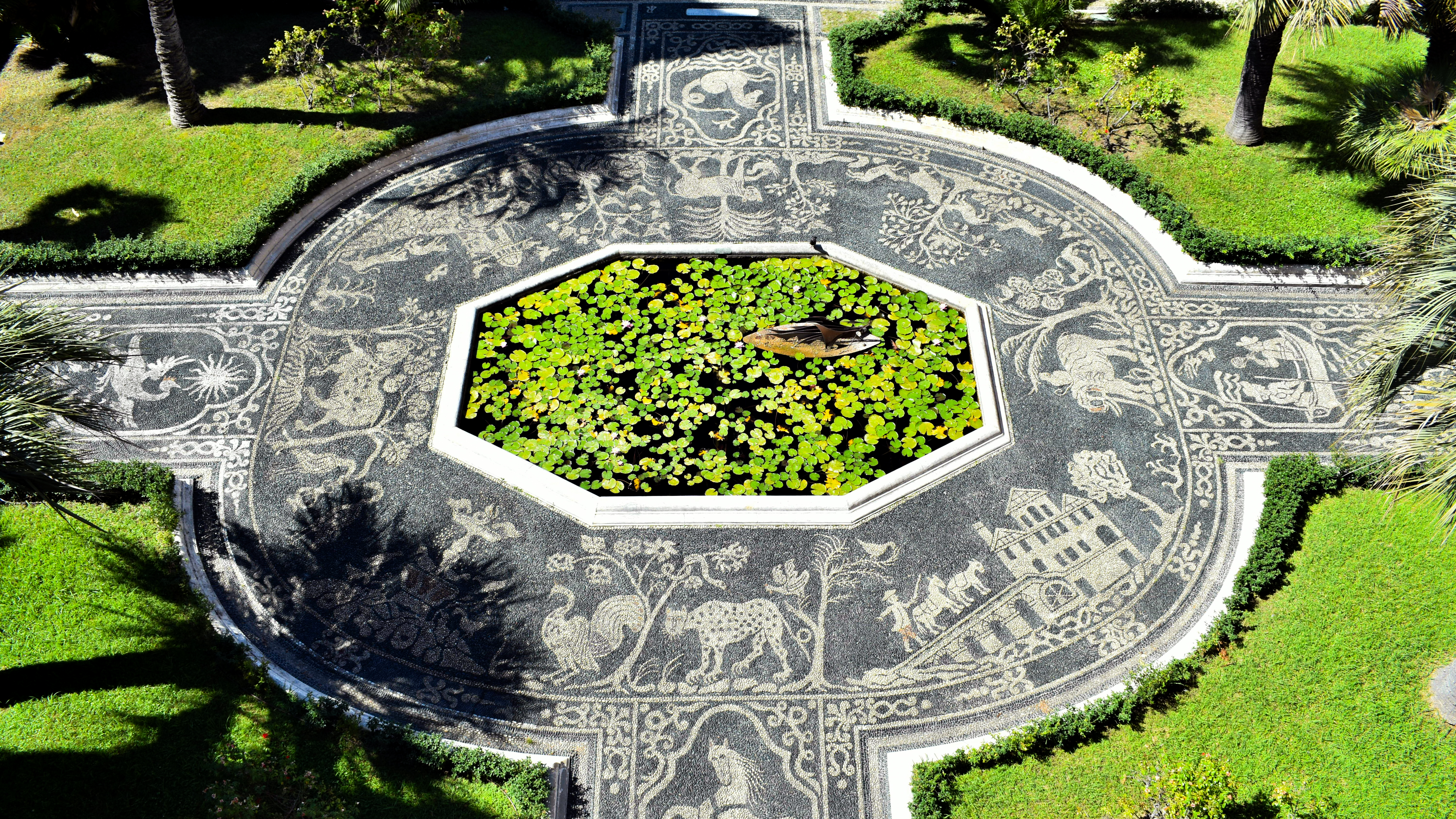
Risseu in the garden

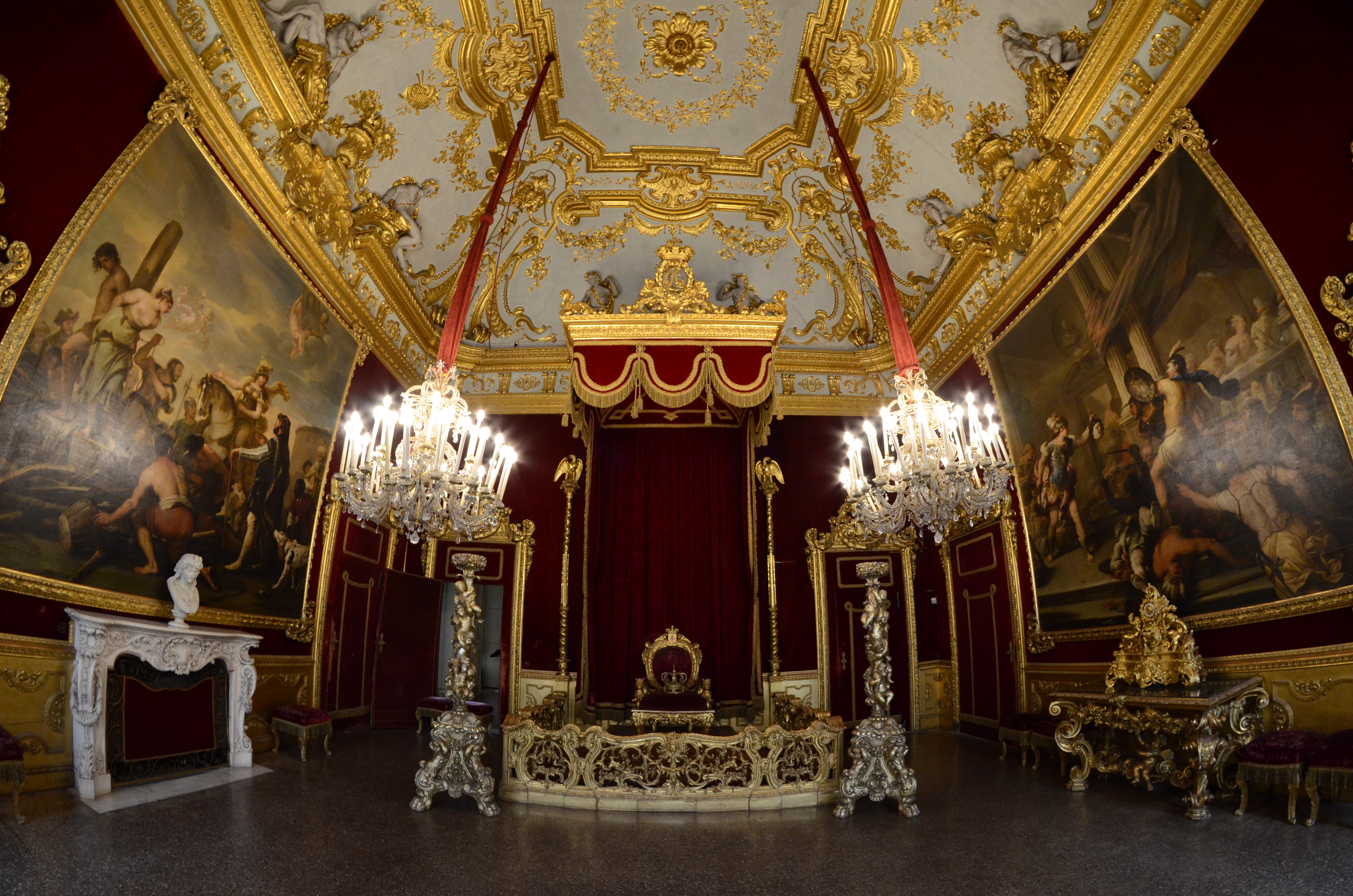
Throne room

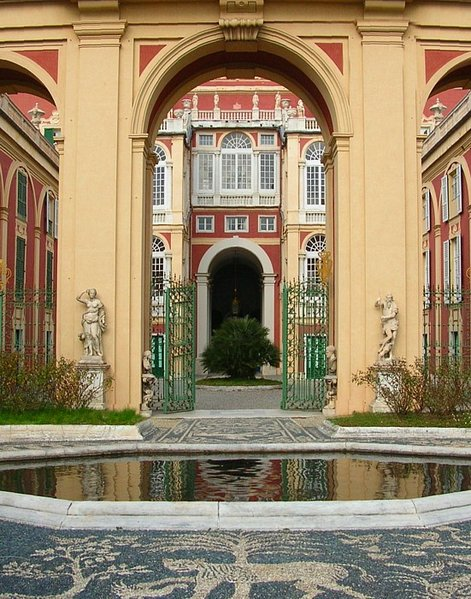
Gardens of the Palazzo Reale

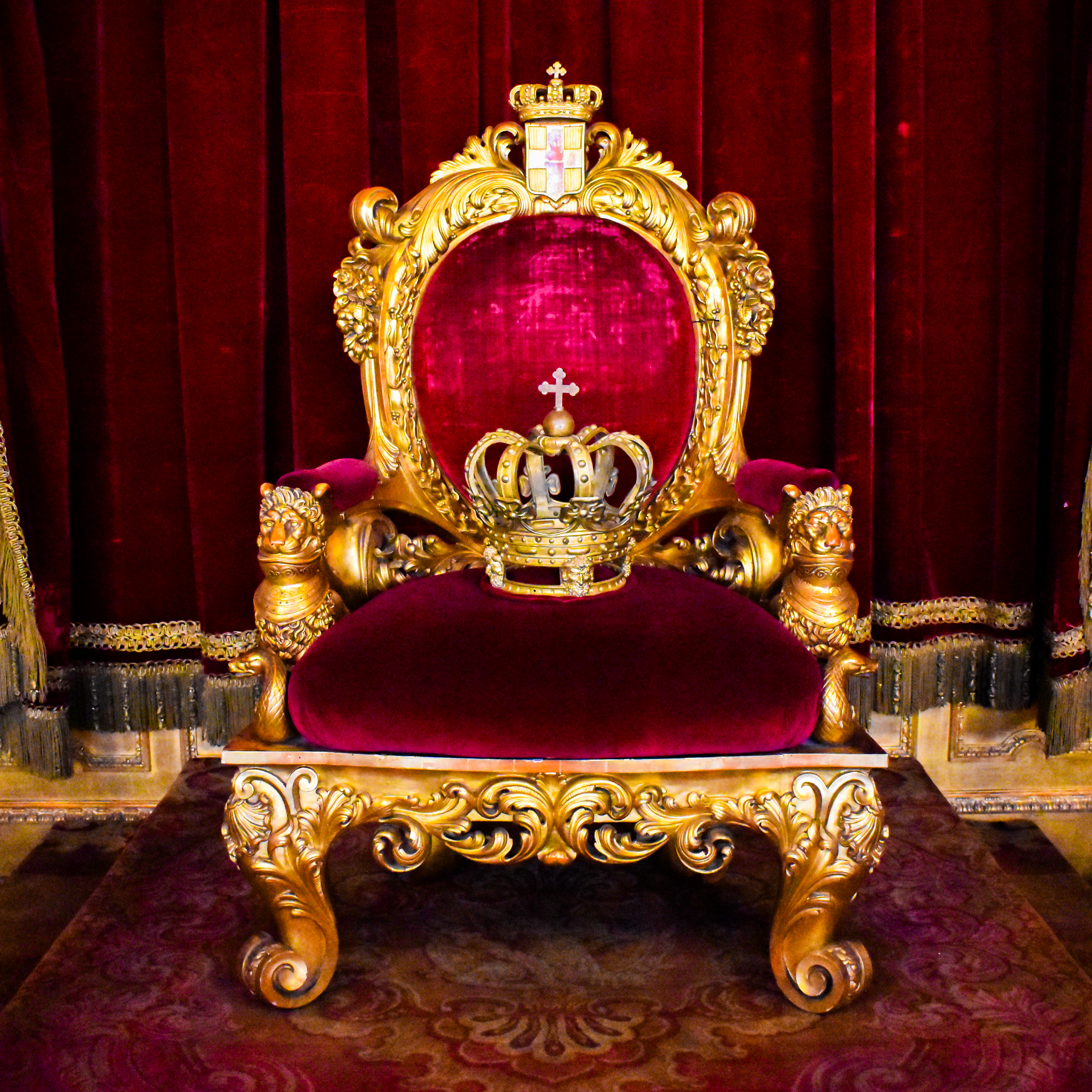
Throne of Palazzo Reale

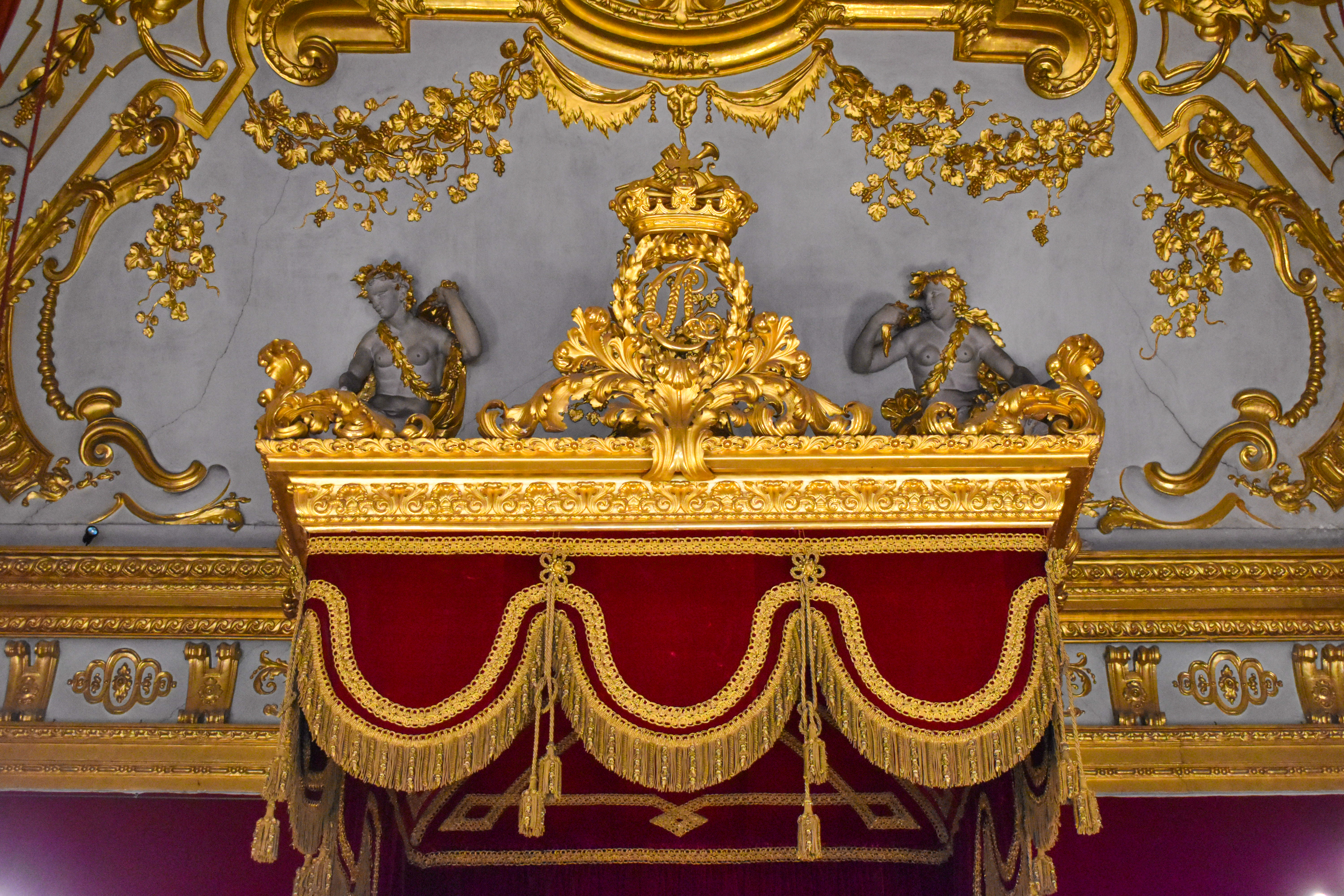
Ornate ceiling of the throne room

== See also ==
- List of Baroque residences
- Palazzi dei Rolli
