= Palazzo Felicini, Bologna =

Palace in Emilia-Romagna, Italy

Palazzo Felicini
- Interactive map of the Palazzo Felicini area

General information
- Architectural style: Renaissance
- Location: Bologna, Italy, Bologna
- Construction started: 1497

The Palazzo Felicini is a Renaissance style palace in Via Riva di Reno 79 in central Bologna, Italy.

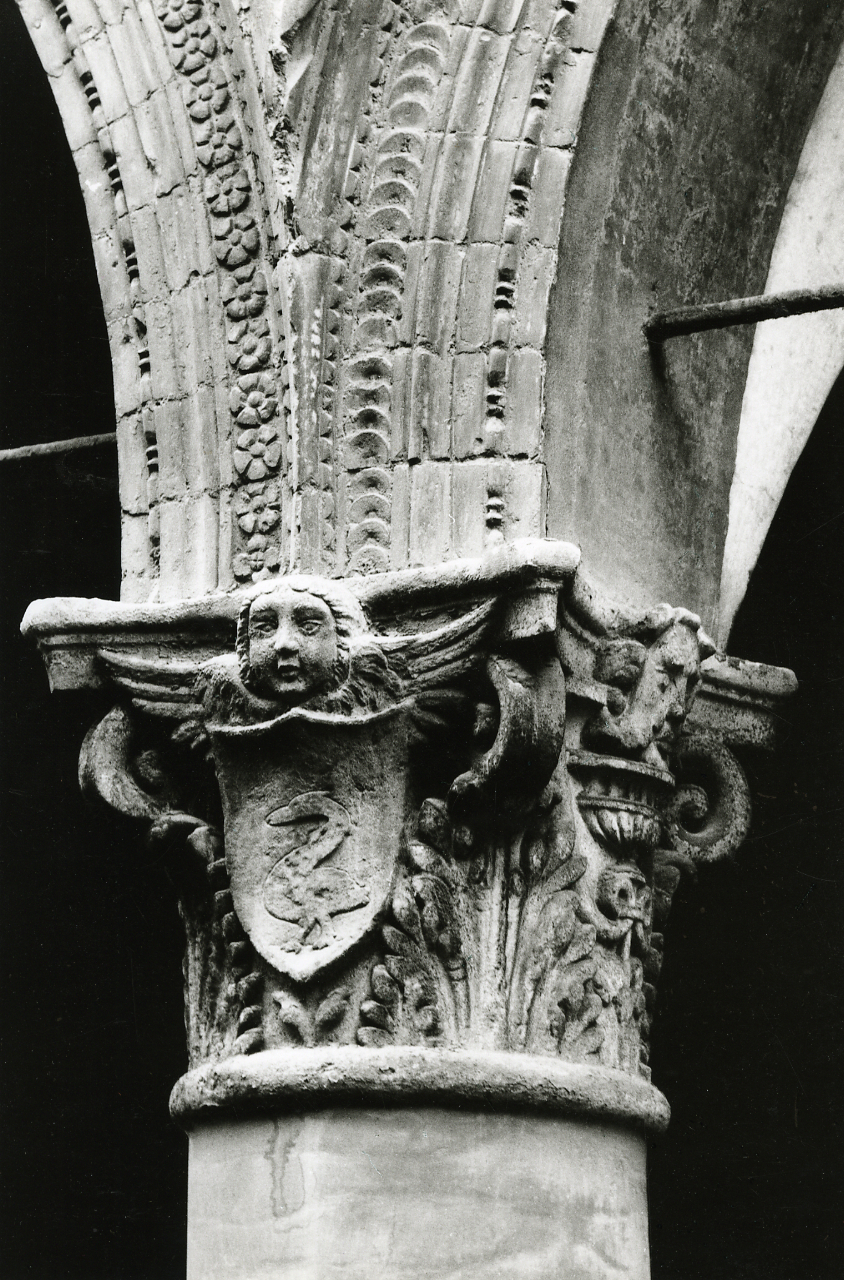
Detail of a capital of the palace. Photo by Paolo Monti, 1969.

As with many of the palaces in the crowded center of Bologna, the piano nobile and facade extend up to the street over an arcaded front. The building stands across from the Palazzo Bonasoni. While Aristotele Fioravanti may have undertaken some work on the palace before leaving the city in the 1470s, the building as we see it today was constructed in 1497, for Bartolomeo Felicini, a prominent member of the local nobility, a banker and city senator. From the time of the expulsion of the tyrant Giovanni II Bentivoglio by the military forces of Pope Julius II, the Felicini family remained prominent and a member was present in the city senate until 1584.

The palace was purchased in 1537 by Cardinal Antonio Pucci, to mark the Pucci family's formal presence in the city. Upon Pucci’s death in 1544 the palace was sold by his heirs to the Fibbia family who, like the Felicini family, formed part of the local oligarchy. It was to remain in the Fibbia family until 1746 (hence the name Palazzo Felicini Fibbia).

The exterior has terracotta decorations. The interiors were frescoed by Angelo Michele Colonna and Giacomo Alboresi (Assumption of the Virgin, Family Chapel); Domenico Santi and Domenico Maria Canuti (Allegory of Aurora, Triumph of Bacchus and Ariadne, and Dusk on the piano nobile, 1664); and Death of Phaeton also by Alboresi and Colonna. Extensive restorations were undertaken in 1905.

== Sources ==
- Salaborsa Site, entry on Palazzo Felicini
