= Palazzo Albergati =

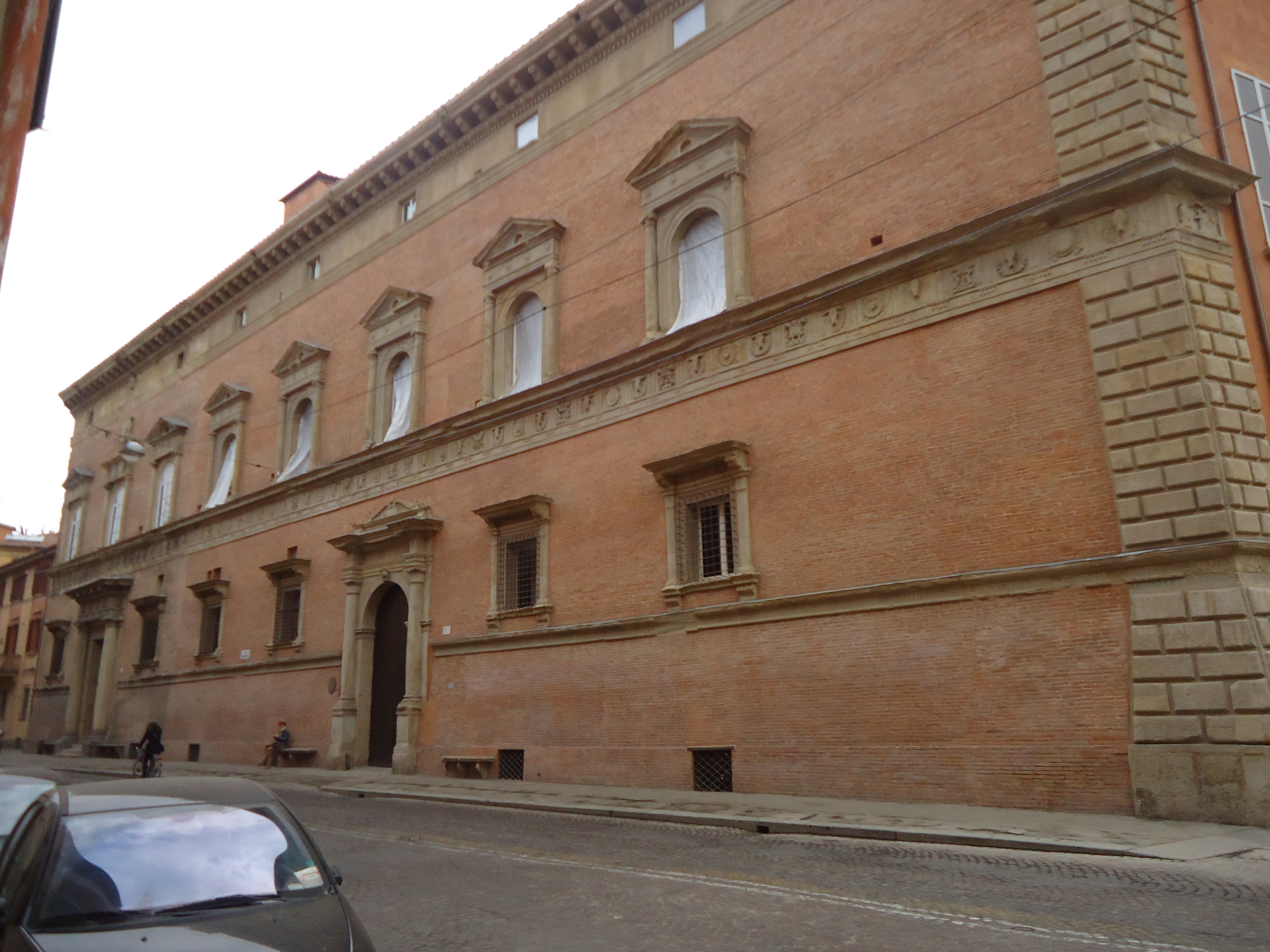
- View of the façade of the Albergati palace in via Saragozza 26
- Interactive map of the Palazzo Albergati area

General information
- Architectural style: Renaissance architecture
- Location: Bologna, Italy, Bologna
- Groundbreaking: 1519

The Palazzo Albergati is a Renaissance style palace located on via Saragozza 26-28 in central Bologna, Italy.

Construction of the palace was initially begun in 1519 to house the Albergati family. The palace was expanded to via Malpertuso in 1540. By the 19th century, the palace had past on from the family, and is now separate apartments.

== Villa Albergati in Zola Predosa ==
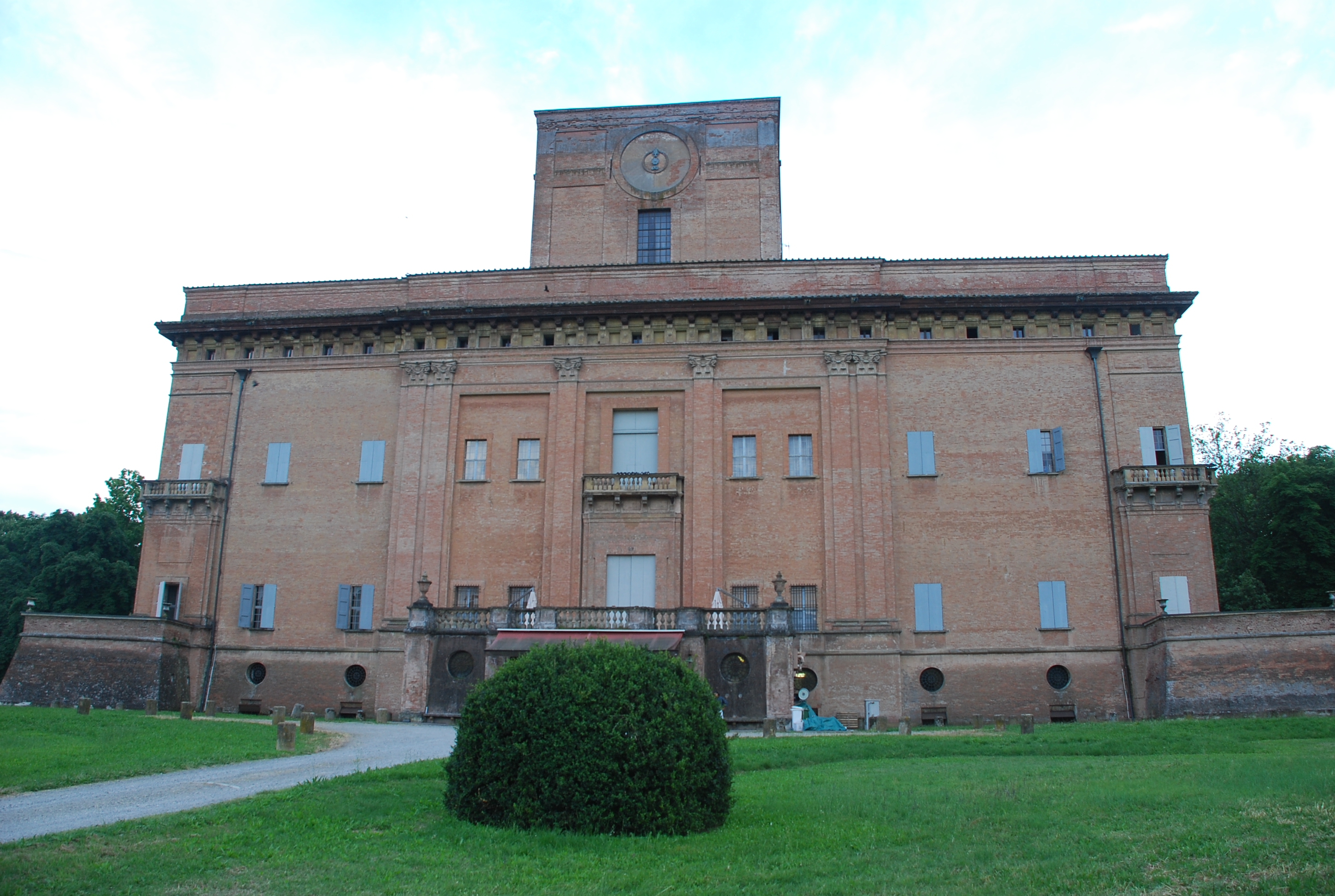
Villa Albergati, Zola Predosa

A villa, built in the 17th century in the commune of Zola Predosa, was owned by the same family is also sometimes referred to as Palazzo Albergati. The architect was Giovanni Giacomo Monti. The villa is remarkable for containing a large three story ballroom and a complex fresco decorations, including mythologic scenes, quadratura, and boschereccia decoration that depicts surrounding forests and vineyards.

The interiors were frescoed by Giacomo Alboresi, Angelo Michele Colonna, Giovanni Antonio Burrini, Prosper and Gaetano Pesci, Giuseppe Valliani, Vittorio Bigari, and Orlandi.
