= Possenti =

Possenti is an Italian surname. Notable people with the surname include:

- Benedetto Possenti (17th century), Italian Baroque painter
- Giovanni Pietro Possenti (1618–1659), Italian Baroque painter
- Marcello Possenti (born 1992), Italian soccer player
