= Raffaele Maccagnani =

Italian painter

Raffaele Maccagnani (March 24, 1841 – August 9, 1925) was an Italian painter, depicting both genre and sacred works.

He was a brother of the sculptor Eugenio Maccagnani. After initial studies in his native Lecce under an uncle, he completed his studies in Naples at the Academy of Fine Arts under Vincenzo Petroncelli. Among his works are Lo Zingaro pittore, in 1886 exhibited at the Promotrice of Napoli; in 1868, he exhibited, Dante e il fabbro; and in 1870, La Vanitosa. He returned to Lecce where a number of portrait commissions were completed, including those of G. Libertini and A. Panzera. He also completed a number of altarpieces and religious works including a Madonna and child with young St John the Baptist, but also painted a San Zita for a church in Lecce; a St Joseph for the church of San Antonio at Fulgenzio; a St Joseph and an Addolorata for the church of Sabatina; and the main altarpiece (1909) of San Rocco for the church of the caduti erected at Sternatia. He died in Lecce.
