= Giovanni Paderna =

Italian painter

Giovanni Paderna (17th century) was an Italian painter of the Baroque period.

He trained with Girolamo Curti, became an accomplished imitator of Agostino Mitelli, the pre-eminent quadratura painter from Bologna. Paderna became a colleague of Baldassare Bianchi; and the latter, at the death of Paderna, having become Mitelli's son-in-law, was placed by the father-in-law to work with Giovanni Giacomo Monti. He died at age 40 years.
