= Luigi Quaini =

Italian painter (1643–1717)

Luigi Quaini (1643–1717) was an Italian painter of the Baroque period.

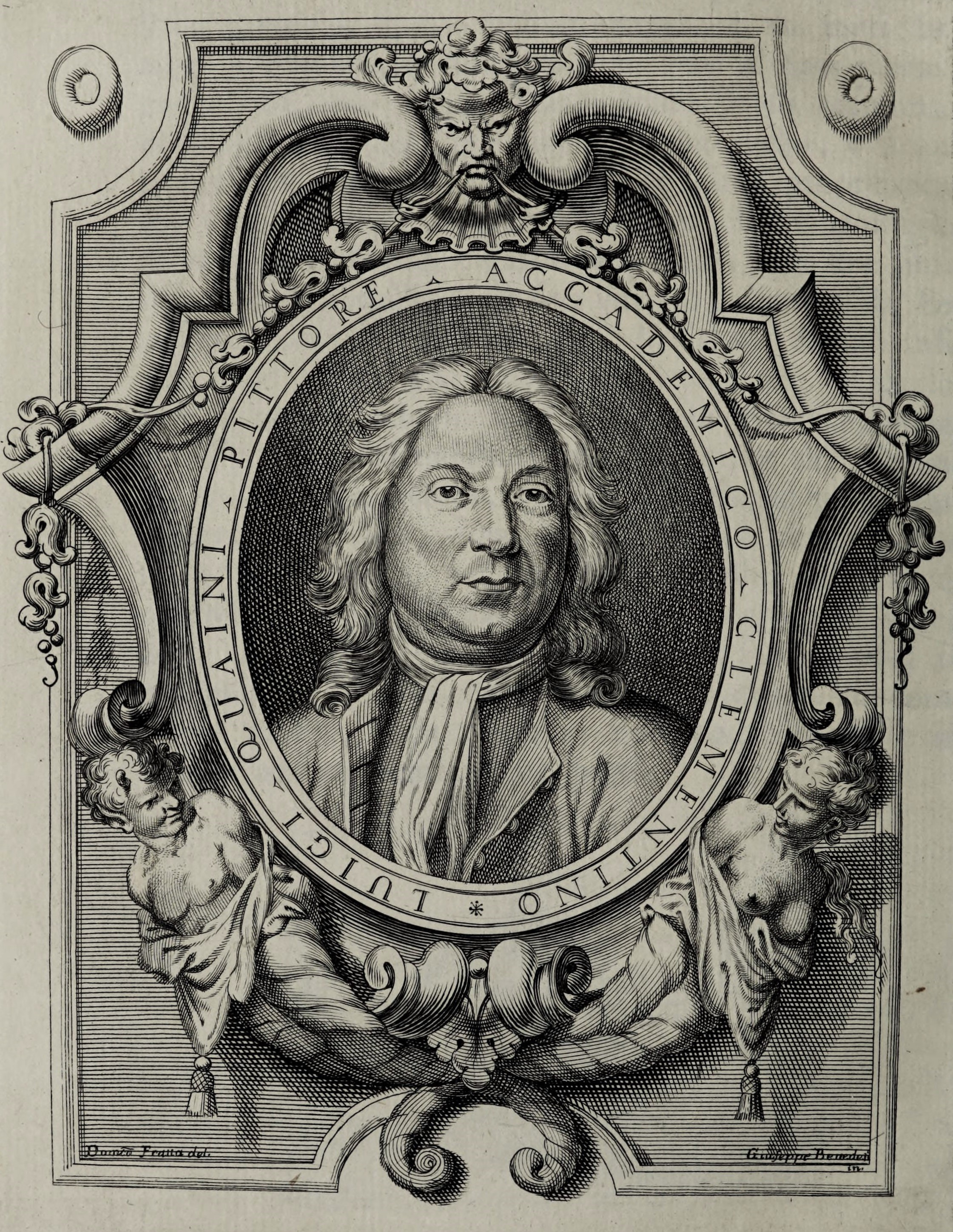
Luigi Quaini

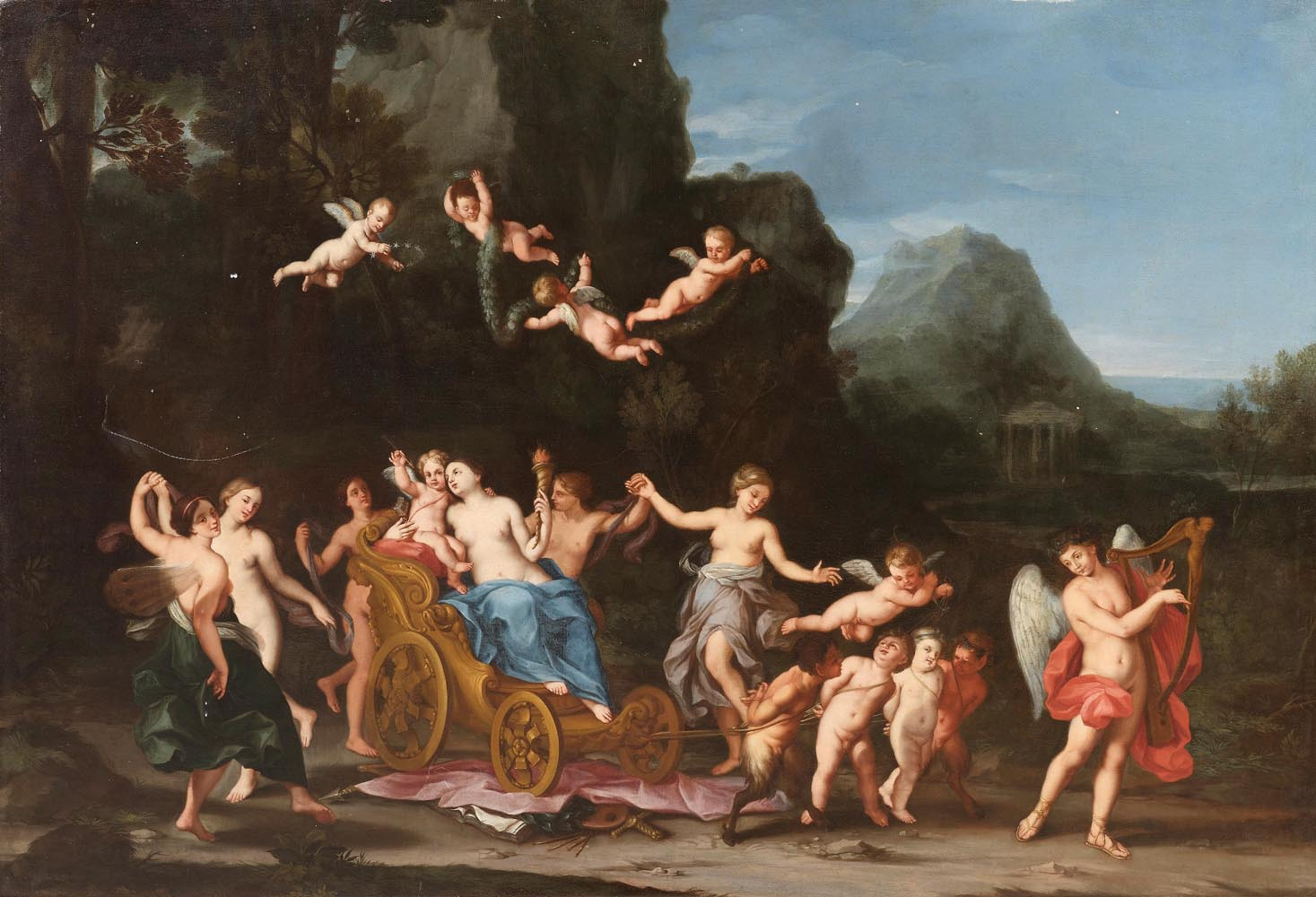
Luigi Quaini, Triumph of Venus and Cupid.

== Biography ==
He was born in Ravenna, and first learned the art of architectural perspective painting from his father, Francesco Quaini, a pupil of Agostino Mitelli. After some training with his father, he became a pupil of Guercino, then of Carlo Cignani (his cousin). There he met a fellow pupil, Marcantonio Franceschini. He became the brother-in-law of the latter, and closely collaborated with him in works at Bologna, Modena, Piacenza, Genoa and Rome. Franceschini supplied the figures and Quaini, the landscapes and architecture. He was named a professor of the Accademia Clementina in Bologna. He traveled to France and England, where he met Charles Le Brun and the engraver Edelinck.

In Rome, he helped compose some of the designs for mosaics in the dome of St. Peter's Basilica. Quaini also completed several altarpieces, including a Visitation for the church of San Giuseppe at Bologna, a Pietà for the church in La Carità, and a San Nicolò visited by the Virgin for the church of San Niccolò.
