= Palazzo Bonasoni, Bologna =

Palazzo Bonasoni
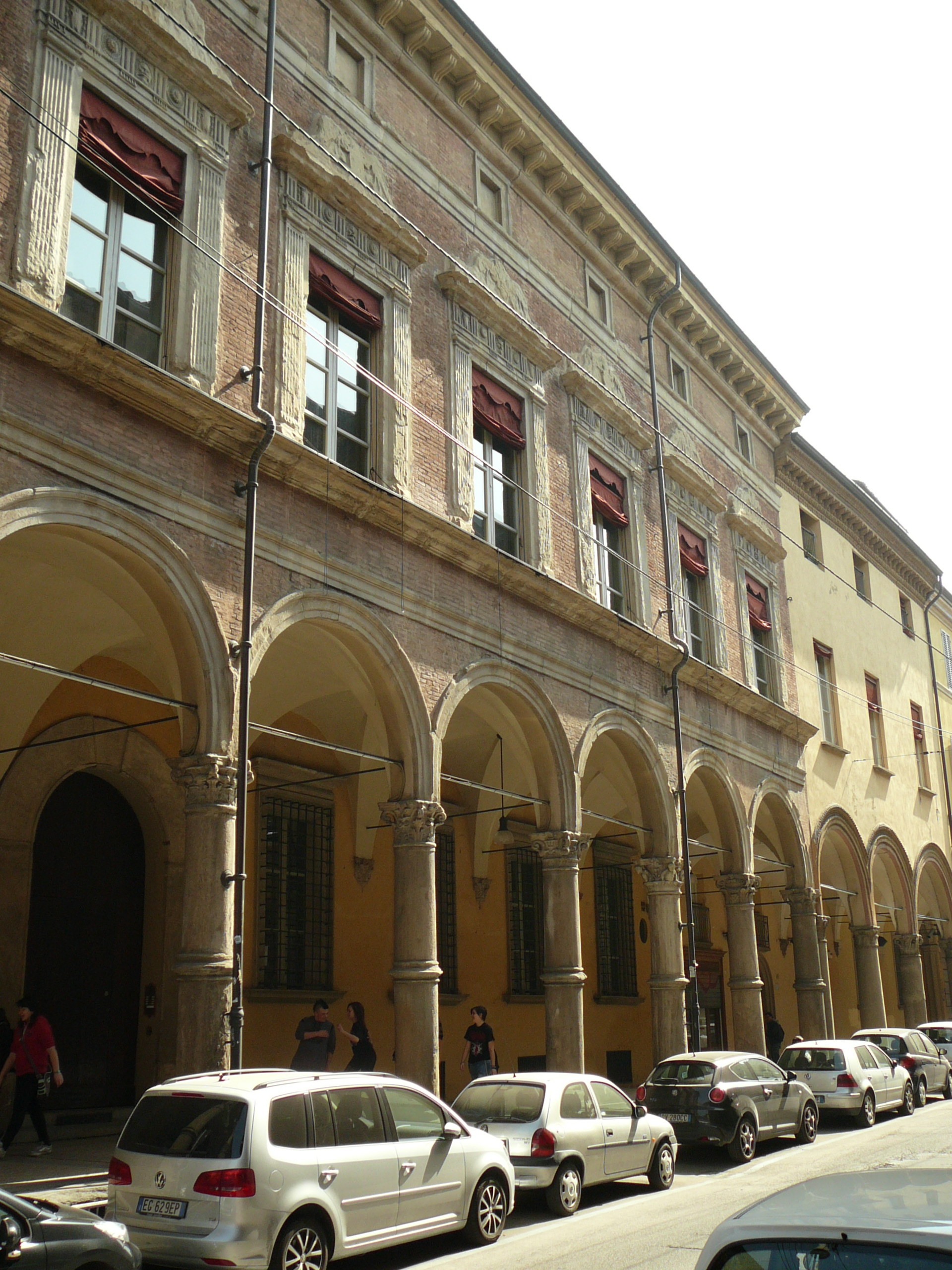
- Facade and street arcade of palace
- Interactive map of the Palazzo Bonasoni area

General information
- Architectural style: Renaissance
- Location: Bologna, Italy, Bologna
- Coordinates: 44.4982°N 11.3422°E
- Groundbreaking: 1566

The Palazzo Bonasoni is a Renaissance-style palace in Via Galliera 21 in central Bologna, Italy. It stands across the street from the Palazzo Felicini.

The site with prior homes belonged originally to the Caccianemici dall’Orso family. By the mid-16th century, it was acquired by the rising nobleman Galeazzo Bonasoni. His family had originally been from San Giovanni in Persiceto and Castello d’Argile, but moved to Bologna by 1472. Galeazzo's father had been a docent in canon law at the University of Bologna. In 1544, Galeazzo had been named knight and Count Palatine by the Holy Roman Emperor Charles V. Documents suggest that in 1556, Galeazzo employed the architect Antonio Morandi, known like his father as il Terribilia, to help design the palace.

The palace passed through various hands. Previously parts of the palace had been frescoed by Mitelli and Bigari, but the works are now lost. It still retains a 16th-century fresco, somewhat damaged, which has been variously attributed to either Giovanni Francesco Bezzi or Pellegrino Tibaldi. Some of the sculpture work is by Achille Bocchi (1555). There are some 19th-century frescoes attributed to Girolamo Dalpane and Malvezzi dè Medici (1854). A marble Venus in a niche in the courtyard is attributed to the 19th-century sculptor Claudia Collina.
