= Paderna (surname) =

Paderna is a surname. Notable people with the surname include:

- Giovanni Paderna (17th century), Italian painter
- Paolo Antonio Paderna (1649–1708), Italian painter
