= Borboni =

Borboni is an Italian surname. Notable people with the surname include:

- Matteo Borboni (c. 1610–1689), Italian painter
- Paola Borboni (1900–1995), Italian stage and film actress
- Pietro Carlo Borboni (1720–1773), Swiss architect
