= Iconophor =

An Iconophor, in graphic and print art, is a form of illustration (usually book illustration) characterized by the fact that the names of the objects represented in it start with a given letter. Its origins lie in medieval illuminations, though the abecedarian connection was usually coincidental in the Middle Ages.

Etymologically, "iconophor" comes from Greek, meaning "bearer" or "transporter" (...phor) of image (ikono..). It seems that it was used formerly in Byzantine Christianity, to define an "icon bearer", in a direct or symbolic sense.

The word iconophor was coined by Thora van Male, a French university professor; her book, Art Dico, presents a historical panorama of the use of such illustrations in French dictionaries. She is currently working on a website to facilitate the study of iconophors (ART DICO homepage).

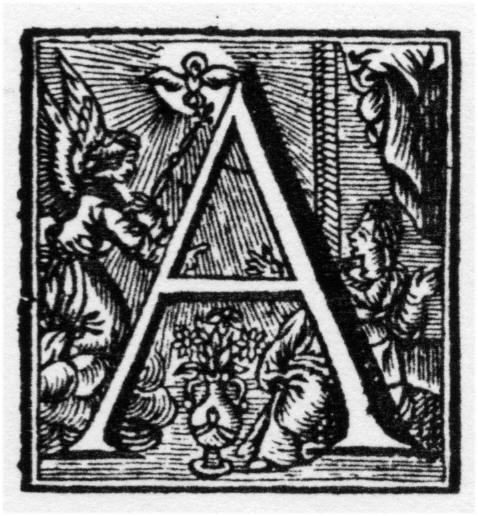
Rochefort Annonciation A

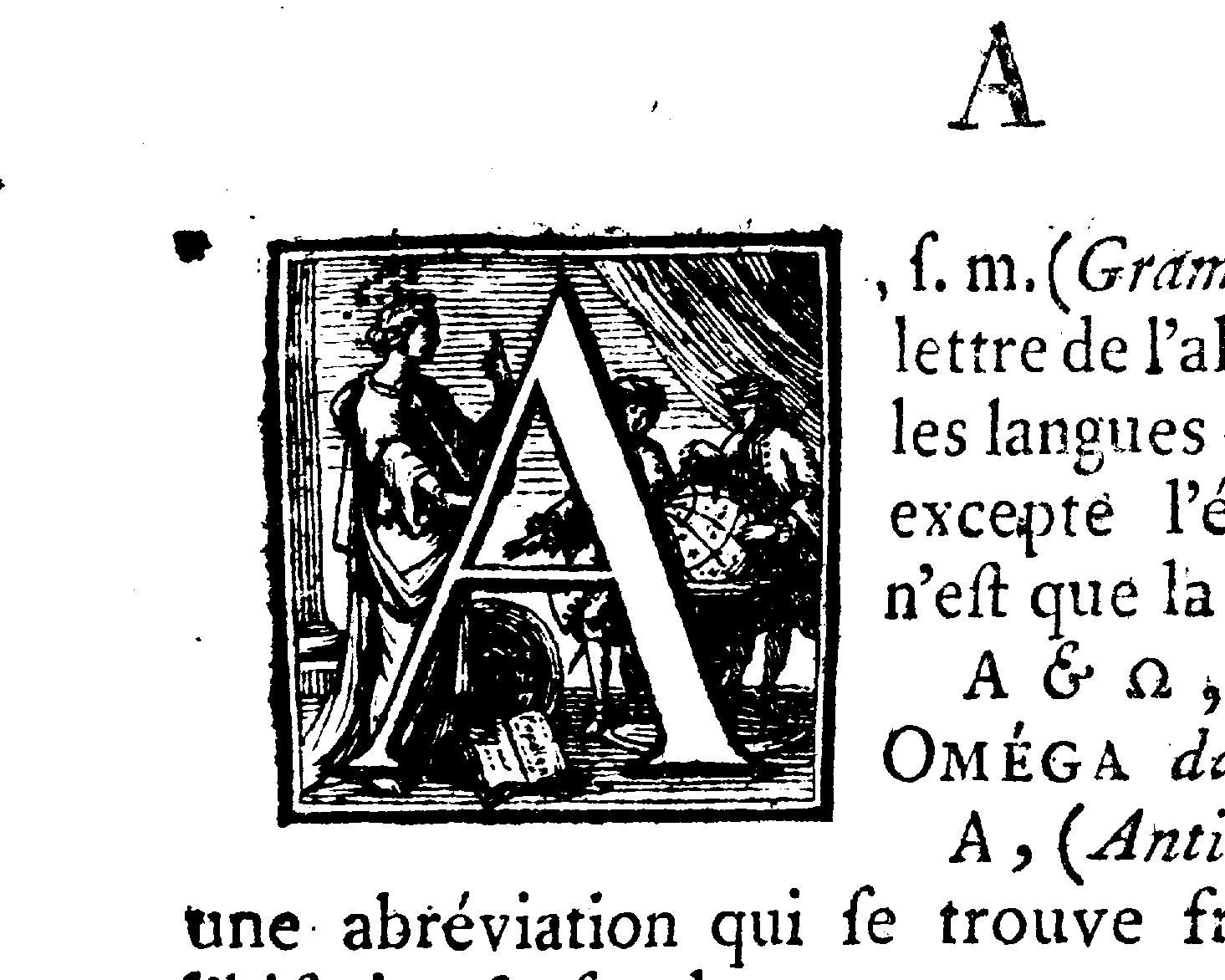
Diderot & d'Alembert (suppl) A

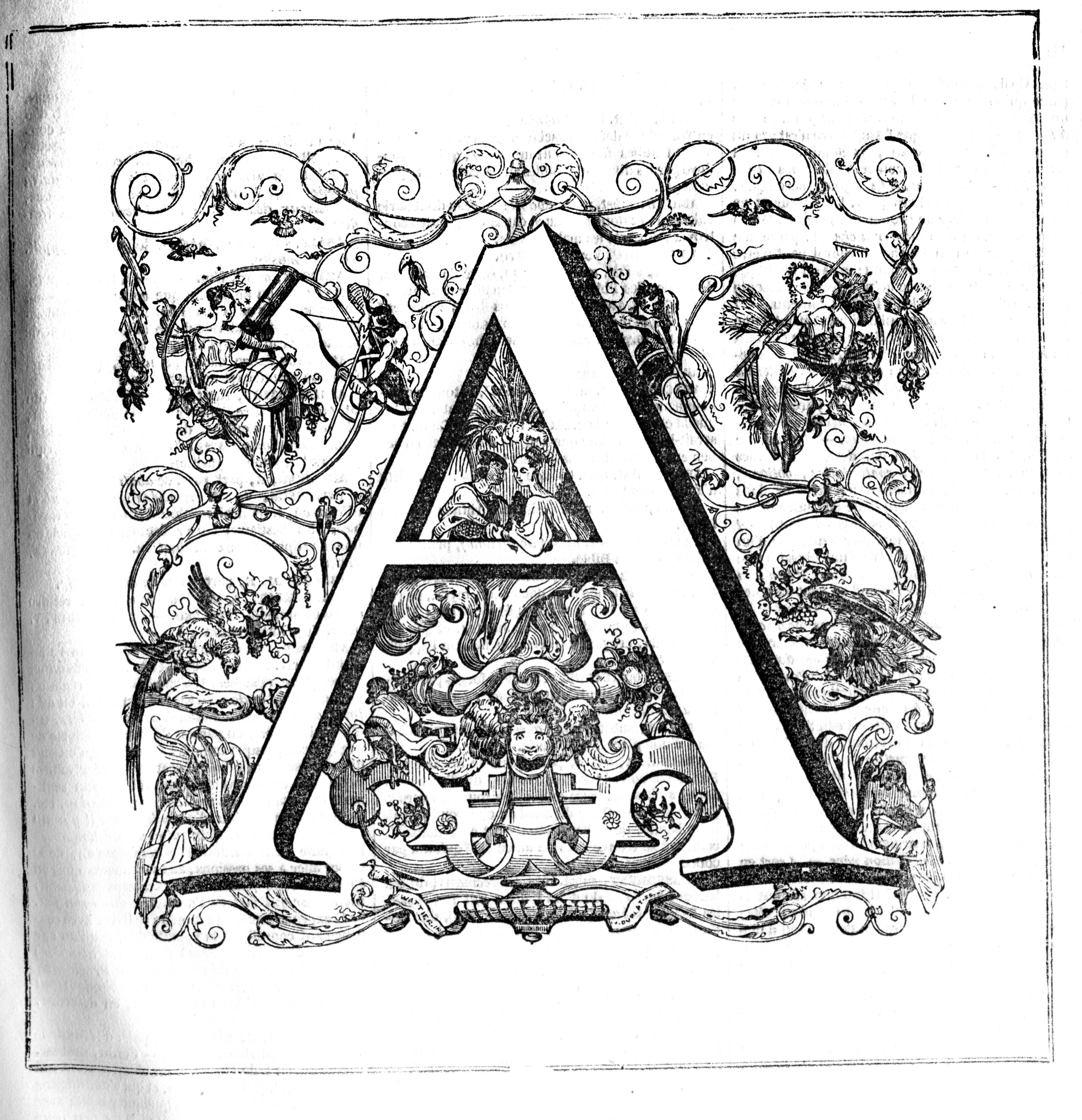
Landais (1834) A

The principle of creating an art form around a letter, and illustrating it with items whose name starts with that letter is not a recent invention. Some of the artists who designed them are:

- 16th century: Hans Holbein (according to Anatole de Courde de Montaiglon, the letters M to Z of Holbein's Alphabet de la Mort are based on this principle); Paulini (certain passages of Ovid's Metamorphoses)
- 17th century: Claude Mellan (French); Giuseppe Maria Mitelli (Italian, Alfabeto in Sogno)

The principle is also commonly used in ABC primers, and often their very mainspring.

In the late 17th century illustrations of this type started appearing in the ornamentation of French dictionaries. The earliest of these was César de Rochefort’s Dictionnaire général et curieux (1685); the only iconophor in it is the ornamental initial letter at A, for Annunciation.

The first lexicographical work to be ornamented with iconophors from A to Z was the supplement to Diderot and d'Alembert's Encyclopédie published in 1776. Congruent with the full title of the Encyclopédie itself (Encyclopédie ou dictionnaire raisonné des sciences, des arts et des métiers), many of the ornamental initial letters portray occupations. Here, A for astronomer.

When, in the 1830s, the illustrated press and illustrated books took off in western Europe, the iconophoric ornamentation of dictionaries also took off. The first dictionary with ornamental head-pieces (as opposed to mere initial letters) from A to Z was Napoléon Landais' Dictionnaire général et grammatical (1834). These wood-engraved headpieces were produced in one of the large Parisian wood-engraving shops, Andrew Best and Leloir. A for abondance, agriculture, aigle (eagle), alouettes (larks), amitié (friendship), ara (South American parrot), Arab, archer, arquebusier, astronomie, avare (scrooge), aveugle (blind person).
