= Fulgenzio =

Fulgenzio is a male given name. Notable people with this name include:

- Fulgenzio Gallucci (1570–1632), Italian Roman Catholic prelate
- Fulgenzio Manfredi (c. 1560–1610), Italian Franciscan friar
- Fulgenzio Micanzio (1570–1654), Italian biographer and Servite friar
- Fulgenzio Mondini (fl. 17th-century), Italian Baroque painter
- Fulgenzio Arminio Monforte (1620–1680), Italian Roman Catholic prelate
- Fulgenzio Vitman (1728–1806), Italian clergyman and botanist
