= Giovanni Battista Caccioli =

Italian painter

Giovanni Battista Caccioli (November 28, 1623 – November 25, 1675) was an Italian painter of the Baroque period.

Caccioli was born in Budrio and trained in Bologna under Domenico Maria Canuti and influenced by Carlo Cignani, where he was a figure painter for the collaborative effort in quadratura of Giovanni Giacomo Monti and Baldassare Bianchi. He was active in Budrio, Parma, Piacenza, Modena, and Mantua (Palazzo Canossa). Many of his works are now destroyed or lost.

His son Giuseppe Antonio Caccioli was also a painter.
