= Girolamo Dal Pane =

Italian painter

Girolamo Dal Pane or Dalpane (1 October 1821 – 1856) was an Italian painter active in Bologna in a Neoclassical style.

== Biography ==
Born in Bologna, starting in 1834, he attended the Collegio Artistico Venturoli. he gained fame in painting frescoes for palaces in Bologna, including the Palazzo Zagnoni-Spada Ceralli (1846); the Palazzo Malvezzi-Saraceni (1852-1853); and the Palazzo Bonasoni. The palazzo Malvezzi Saraceni was decorated with allegorical frescoes, including scenes from the Decameron and portraits of famous Italian writers. In 1854, Vincenzo Ghinelli commissioned Girolamo and Luigi Samoggia to redecorate the Teatro Gioacchino Rossini of Pesaro.
