= Andrea Seghizzi =

Italian painter

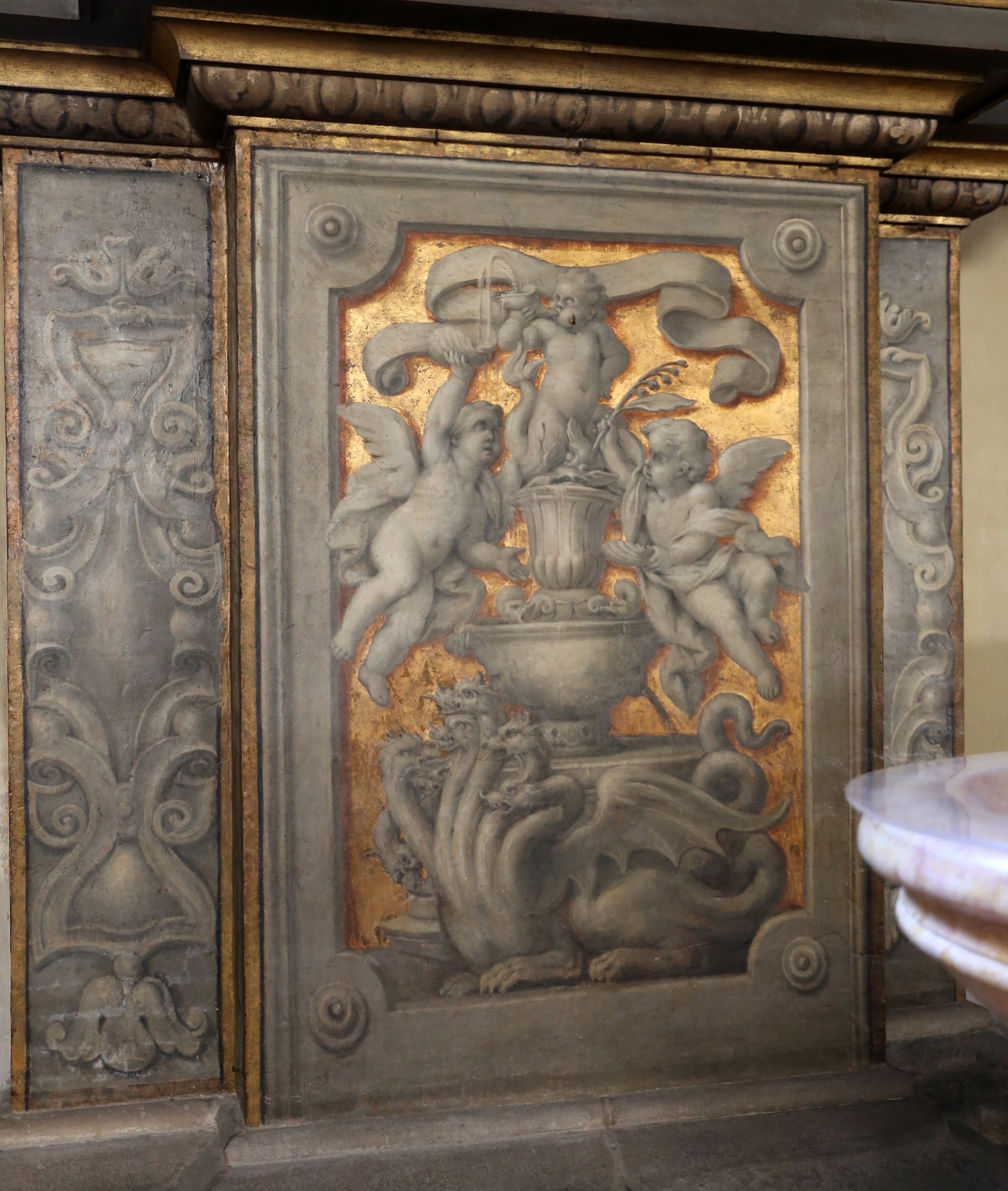
Paintings in the Steccata Basilica of Parma

Andrea Seghizzi or Sghizzi (fl. 17th century) was an Italian painter of the Baroque period, active mainly in Bologna.

Seghizzi was born in Bologna around 1630. He initially trained with Francesco Albani and Lucio Massari, but then worked alongside Francesco Brizio and then Francesco Gessi, mostly as a fresco artist. He helped decorate the palazzo Arcivescovile (Archbishop's palace) of Ravenna with Angelo Michele Colonna. Then joined a team with Girolamo Curti and Colonna in Parma. In Bologna, he painted in Villa di Riolo for the Grimaldi and some rooms for the Count Cornelio Malvasia, from the family of the Bolognese art historian Cesare Malvasia.

In January 1666 he collaborated with Frans Geffels on the complex of decorations and objects made for the funeral of Duke Charles II Gonzaga, Duke of Nevers in the Basilica palatina di Santa Barbara of Mantua.
