= Baldassare Bianchi =

Italian painter

- Born: 1612; Bologna
- Died: 1679 (aged 66–67); Modena
- Known for: Painting and Engraving
- Movement: Baroque quadratura

Baldassare Bianchi (1612 in Bologna – 1679) was an Italian painter of the Baroque period.

== Biography ==
He was first a pupil of Giovanni Paderna, but after Paderna's death, he trained with Agostino Mitelli, the pre-eminent quadratura painter from Bologna. Bianchi married Mitelli's daughter. Bianchi became a colleague of Giovanni Giacomo Monti, another Mitelli pupil. This partnership also met with success particularly at Mantua, where they both received regular salaries from the Ducal government. Their figure-painter was Giovanni Battista Caccioli of Budrio, pupil to Domenico Maria Canuti, and a good disciple of Carlo Cignani.

With Mitelli, he painted quadratura at Ducal palace of Sassuolo. He was also long employed by the dukes of Modena. He also decorated the theatres of Mantua and Modena. He died at Modena. His daughter, Lucrezia Bianchi, was also a painter. Enrico Haffner was one of his pupils.
