= Aristotele Fioravanti =

Italian architect (c. 1415 – c. 1486)

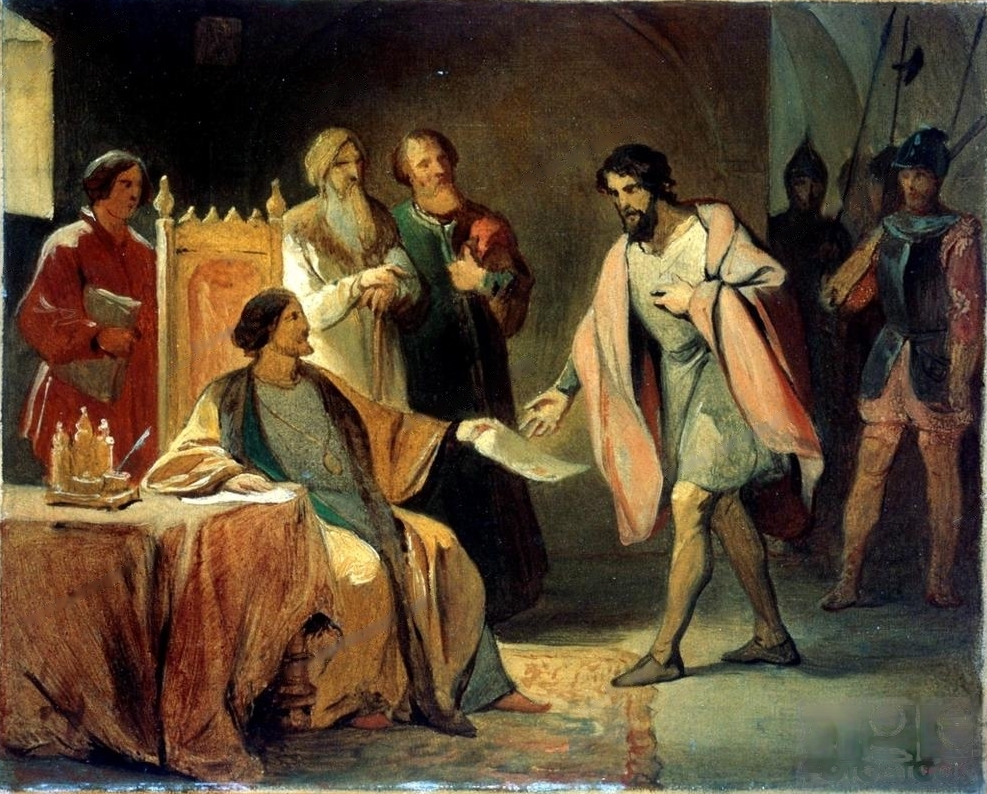
- Tsar Ivan III assigns Aristotle Fioravanti an order for coinage in 1479, painting by Pyotr Basin (19th century)
- Born: c. 1415; Bologna
- Died: c. 1486

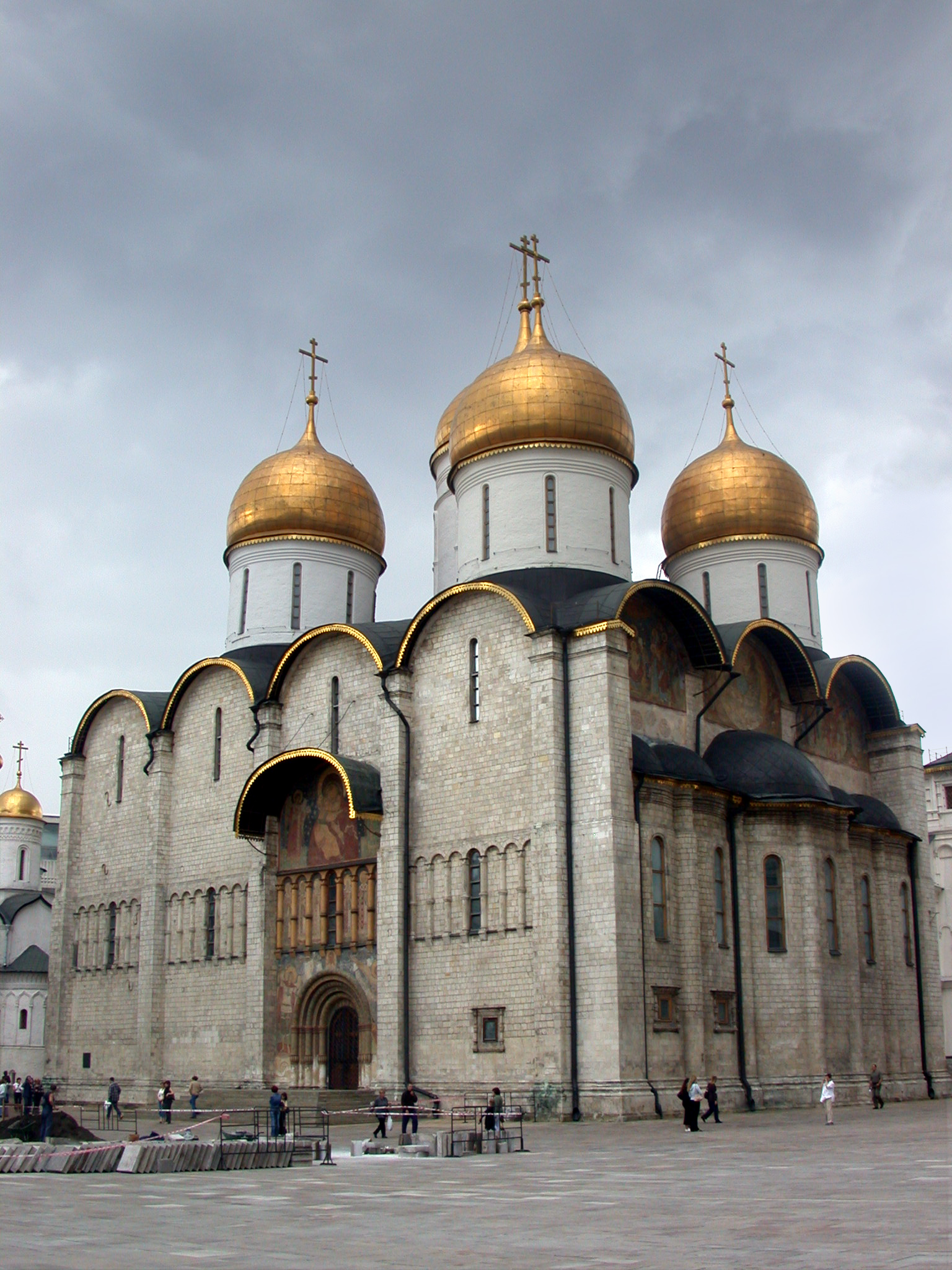
Dormition Cathedral in Moscow

Ridolfo "Aristotele" Fioravanti (also spelled Fieraventi; Russian: Аристотель Фиораванти; (Note: Other versions include: Фьораванти, Фиеравенти, Фиораванте.) c. 1415 – c. 1486) was an Italian Renaissance architect and engineer. He was active in Moscow from 1475, where he designed the Dormition Cathedral (1475–1479).

== Biography ==
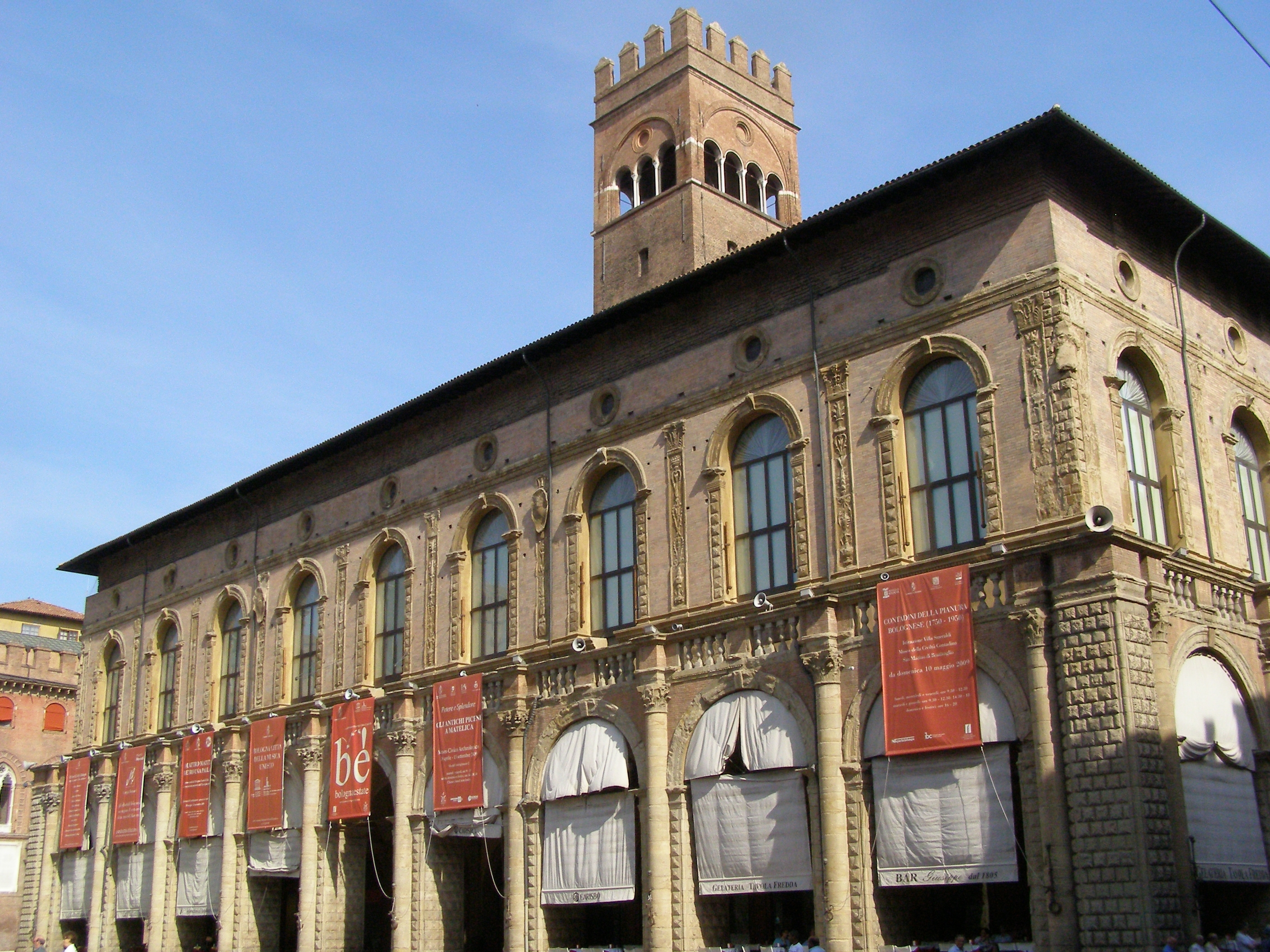
Palazzo del Podestà in Bologna

Little is known about Fioravanti's early years. He was born in Bologna around 1415 into a family of architects and hydraulic engineers.

He became renowned for the very innovative devices he used for the rebuilding of the towers belonging to the noble families of the city. Between 1458 and 1467, he worked in Florence for Cosimo de' Medici the Elder and in Milan, before returning to his native city. There, he created the plans for the Palazzo Bentivoglio, but the edifice was not finished (by Giovanni II Bentivoglio) until 1484–1494. In 1467, he worked for King Matthias Corvinus in Hungary.

In 1475, at the invitation of Ivan III, he went to Moscow where he built the Dormition Cathedral from 1475 to 1479, taking inspiration from the Dormition Cathedral of Vladimir, a symbol of the center of the Russian Church, while introducing new influences at the same time. This is the work for which he is best remembered and is considered to be evidence that Moscow attracted leading Italian masters.

According to some accounts, he was thrown into prison by Ivan III when he asked to return to Italy, and died in captivity. According to other accounts, he participated as a military engineer and artillery commander in the campaigns against Novgorod (1477–1478), Kazan (1482) and Tver (1485). He died around 1486.

== See also ==
- Palazzo del Podestà, Bologna
- Palazzo Felicini, Bologna

== Sources ==
- "Альберти Фиораванти, Аристотель" . Brockhaus and Efron Encyclopedic Dictionary (in Russian). 1906.
- Shvidkovsky, Dmitry Olegovich (1 January 2007). Russian Architecture and the West. Yale University Press. ISBN 978-0-300-10912-2.
