= Palazzo Leoni, Bologna =

Coordinates: 44°29′48.05″N 11°20′49.07″E

Palazzo Leoni
- Interactive map of the Palazzo Leoni area

General information
- Architectural style: Renaissance architecture
- Location: Bologna, Italy, Bologna
- Groundbreaking: 1519

The Palazzo Leoni is a Renaissance style palace located on Via Marsala #31, in front of the outlet of Via Mentana, in central Bologna, region of Emilia-Romagna, Italy. The apse of the church of San Martino, is across the street.

== History ==
The site was acquired in 1549 by Camillo Leoni Nordoli, and construction began by 1569 until 1583, commissioned by Camillo's brother Girolamo. The house was inherited by Girolamo's son, Vincenzo (1523–1600), who commissioned much of the fresco decoration. Vincenzo served as president of the Accademia degli Ardenti.

The architect is unknown, but some details suggest Antonio Morandi, known as il Terribilia, while other attribute it to Gerolamo da Treviso.

The interior frescoes mainly date from the late Renaissance or Mannerist period. Previously a fresco of the Nativity (circa 1550), painted by Nicolò dell’Abate, was located in the entrance. But now only an engraving of a much repainted version exists by Gaetano Gandolfi. The frescoes in the main floor rooms are attributed to the studio or followers of Nicolò dell’Abate, and depict events from the Iliad and the Classical Roman epic of Aeneid. The panels in the main salon include:

- The conversation of Capys and Themiste
- Sinon is brought before Priam
- Laocoön and his sons killed by Sea Serpents
- Wooden Horse enters Troy
- Greek army pierces Gates of Troy
- Aeneas visited in a dream by the ghost of Hector, prepares for Battle
- Aeneas meets Panto; Corebo wearing the Helmet of Androgeus
- Cassandra dragged out of the Temple of Minerva
- Aeneas, Iphitus, and Pelias Run to defend Priam
- Hecuba leads Priam to the hearth altar
- Pyrrhus kills Polites
- Venus asks Aeneas to spare Helen's life
- Omens persuade Anchises, father of Aeneas, to abandon Troy
- The escape from Troy

The Anteroom has twelve scenes from the Aeneid, the first two scenes are now lost, but known from engravings:

1. Dido confides in her sister Anna
2. Dido sacrifices to the Gods
3. Dido shows the city to Aeneas
4. Conversation between Juno and Venus
5. The Hunt
6. Dido and Aeneas in the cave
7. Fame divulges the marriage of Aeneas and Dido to Iarbas, the king of Gaetulia, and Dido's rejected suitor
8. Mercury orders Aeneas to leave Carthage
9. Aeneas tells his companions to plan for leaving
10. Trojans prepare to sail from Carthage
11. Anna pleads with Aeneas not to leave
12. Mercury appears to Aeneas in a dream

In 1709, with the death of the last male Leoni, the palace was inherited by Count Pier Paolo Malvezzi Locatelli, who had married Maria Caterina Leoni. One of his sons was the cardinal Vincenzo Malvezzi Locatelli, who became president of the Accademia Filarmonica. During the 1600s, the upper salon was used for meetings and performances by the Accademia dei Ravvivati, founded by Francesco Albergati Capacelli.

In the 18th through 19th century, the palace had a number of owners from the painter Giuseppe Sedazzi, to the Marchesini family and finally to the Collegio di Spagna. The palace in 2011 was used by the Institute of Beni Culturali as a library.
