= Giuseppe Maria Mitelli =

Italian engraver and painter

Giuseppe Maria Mitelli (1634–1718) was an Italian etcher and painter of the Baroque period. He was the son of the prominent quadratura painter Agostino Mitelli. The younger Mitelli was best known for his prolific etchings, in a great variety of subjects, including scenes from grand epics to mundane page boards for games of chance using dice, Tarot cards, and an Iconophor with anthropomorphized alphabets. He also etched genre subjects, allegories, moralistic scenes, but even some bizarre cartoons that could be interpreted as sometimes provocatively subversive, or presciently revolutionary, and sometimes imaginatively bizarre. He often depicted dwarfs engaged in buffoonery or satirical depictions of aphorisms, which recalls the Bambocciate di nani or arte pigmeo of genre painter Faustino Bocchi (1659–1742).

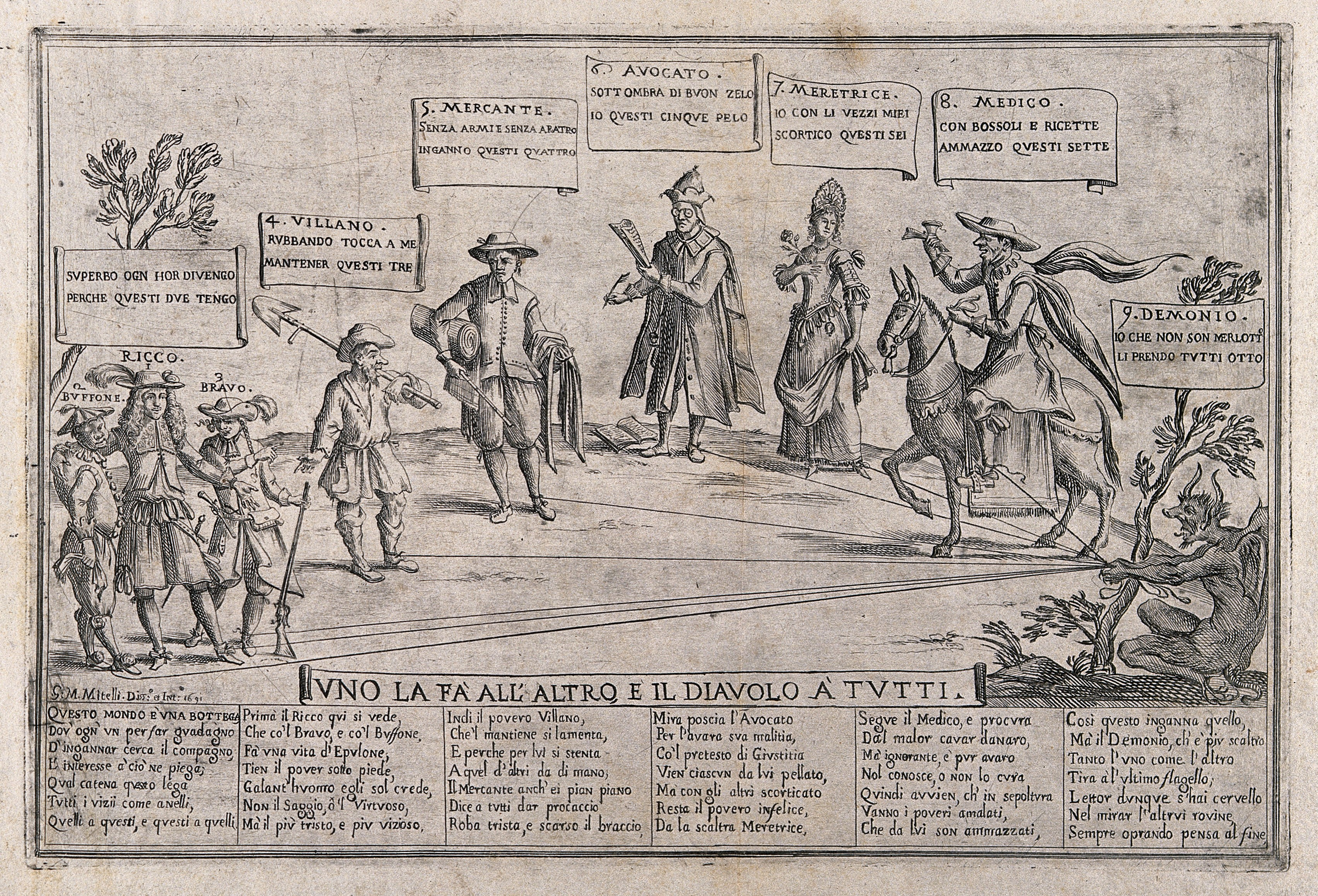
The Social Classes, all controlled by the Devil

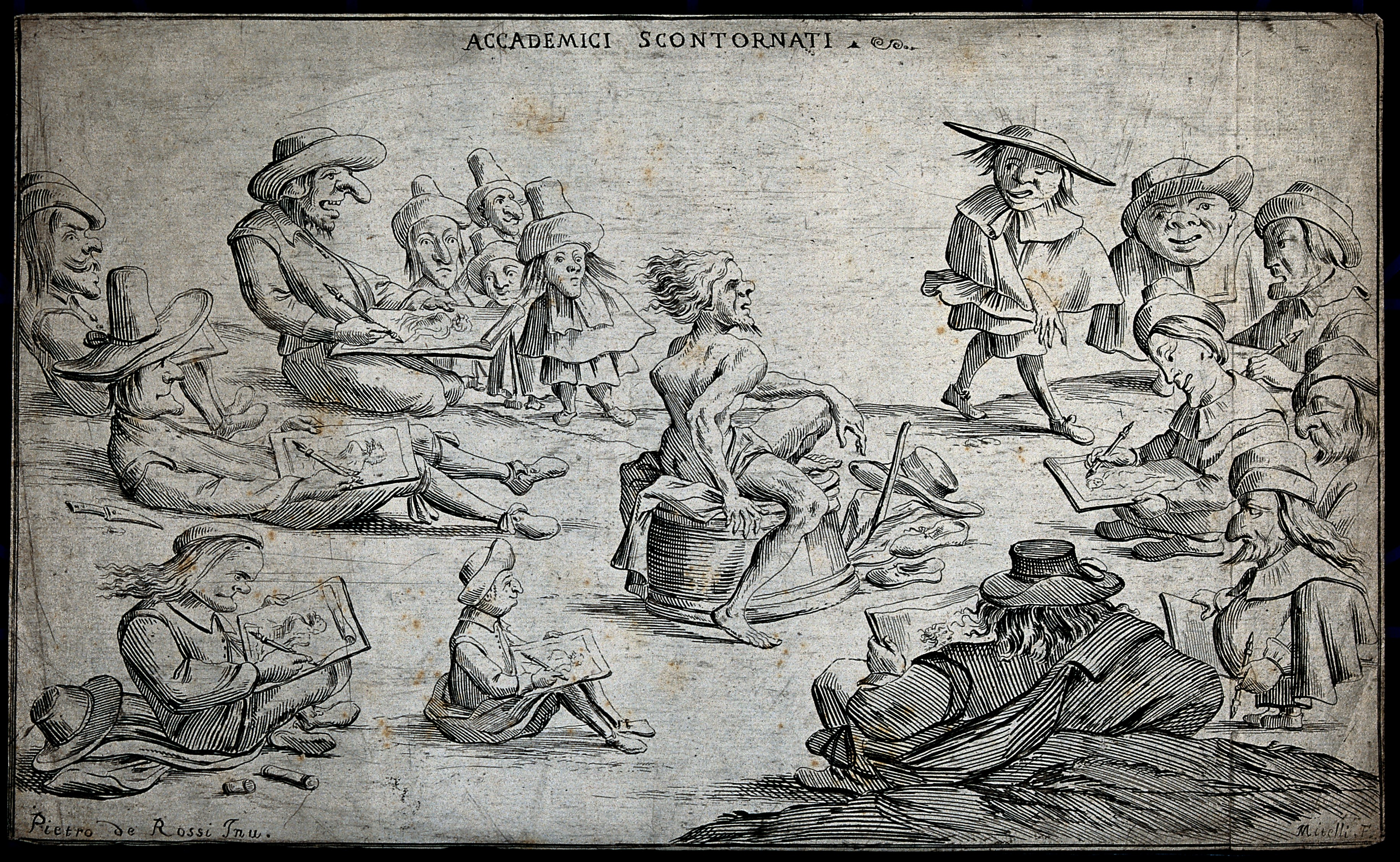
An Academy of Dwarf Painters drawing a Hunchback Model.

Giuseppe studied or worked under Francesco Albani, Flaminio Torri, Guercino, and Simone Cantarini; he had a long career of over 60 years in Bologna. Mitelli was a flamboyant character who was also a painter and sculptor. He enjoyed a broad set of physical activities including fencing, hunting, fishing, tennis, gymnastics, and acting.

== Engravings of Contemporary Trades ==
Giuseppe Maria produced a series of etchings depicting Arts of the Street, published in 1660. This was part II of a book of etchings, in which part I, Diverse Figure, had been engraved by Simon Guillain II, and published in Bologna by Giovanni Atanasio Mosini. The inspiration for these works was either from Annibale Carracci’s drawings, or subsequent engravings by Simon Guillain II.

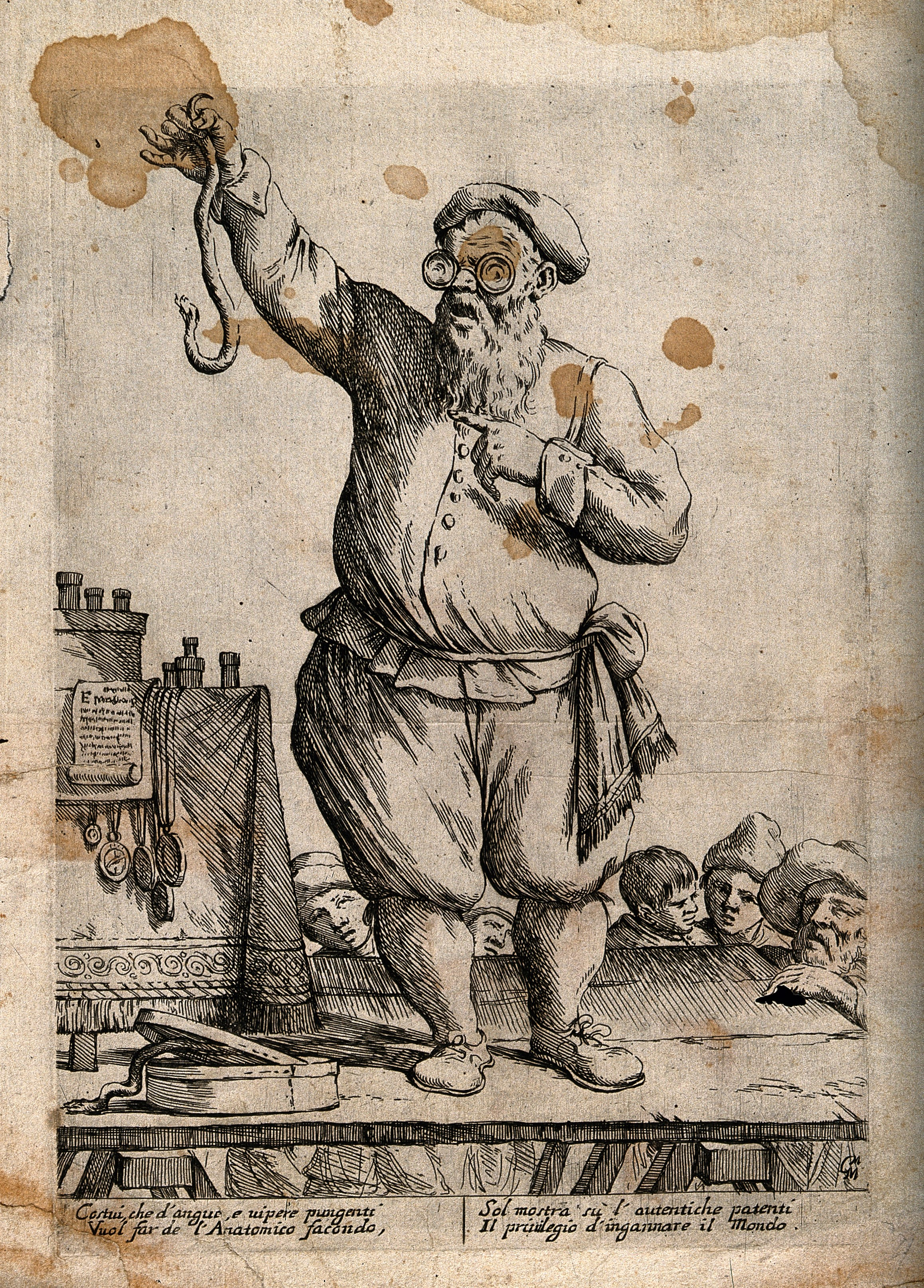
Patent-Medicine Quack Hawking Snakes.

The second part, titled The Arts of the Street (Di Bologna. L’Arti per Via) celebrates the tradesmen and workmen who practiced their occupations in the streets of Bologna. A list of the etchings includes:

- Frontispiece, View of Bologna
- 1. Man Carrying Bread in a Basket
- 2. Vendor of Fans
- 3. Vendor of Earthenware Pots
- 4. Knife Grinder
- 5. Vendor of Ciambelle (Biscuit Vendor) 126
- 6. Fisherman
- 7. Water Carrier
- 8. Patent-Medicine Quack Hawking Snakes (see image)
- 9. Mason
- 10. Vendor of Cooked Apples and Pears by Moonlight
- 11. Man Carrying a Barrel of Wine
- 12. Man Carrying a Butchered Pig
- 13. Vendor of Dry Goods
- 14. Porter
- 15. Mason Going to Whitewash Walls (Imbianchino)(Plasterer)
- 16. Man Skinning a Lamb
- 17. Vendor of Ribbons, Lace, and Pins
- 18. Donkey Driver with his Herd
- 19. Chimney sweep
- 20. Woodcutter
- 21. Vine Dresser
- 22. Vendor of Chairs
- 23. Vendor of Rosaries and Sacred Images
- 24. Vendor of Sieves
- 25. Vendor of Chicken Dung
- 26. Man Driving a Donkey Laden with Pots
- 27 Onion Seller
- 28. Vendor of Anisette and a Vendor of Matches Playing Morra
- 29. Fruit Seller
- 30. Cheese Vendor
- 31. Vegetable Vendor
- 32. Tripe Vendor
- 33. Vendor of Glassware
- 34. Two Well Cleaners
- 35. Vendor of Iron Kitchen Utensils
- 36. Vendor of Grain Sifters
- 37. Butcher Boy with Two Cats
- 38. Vendor of Shoes
- 39. Hat Vendor
- 40. Vendor of Chicken Heads and Livers

== Tarot of Mitelli ==
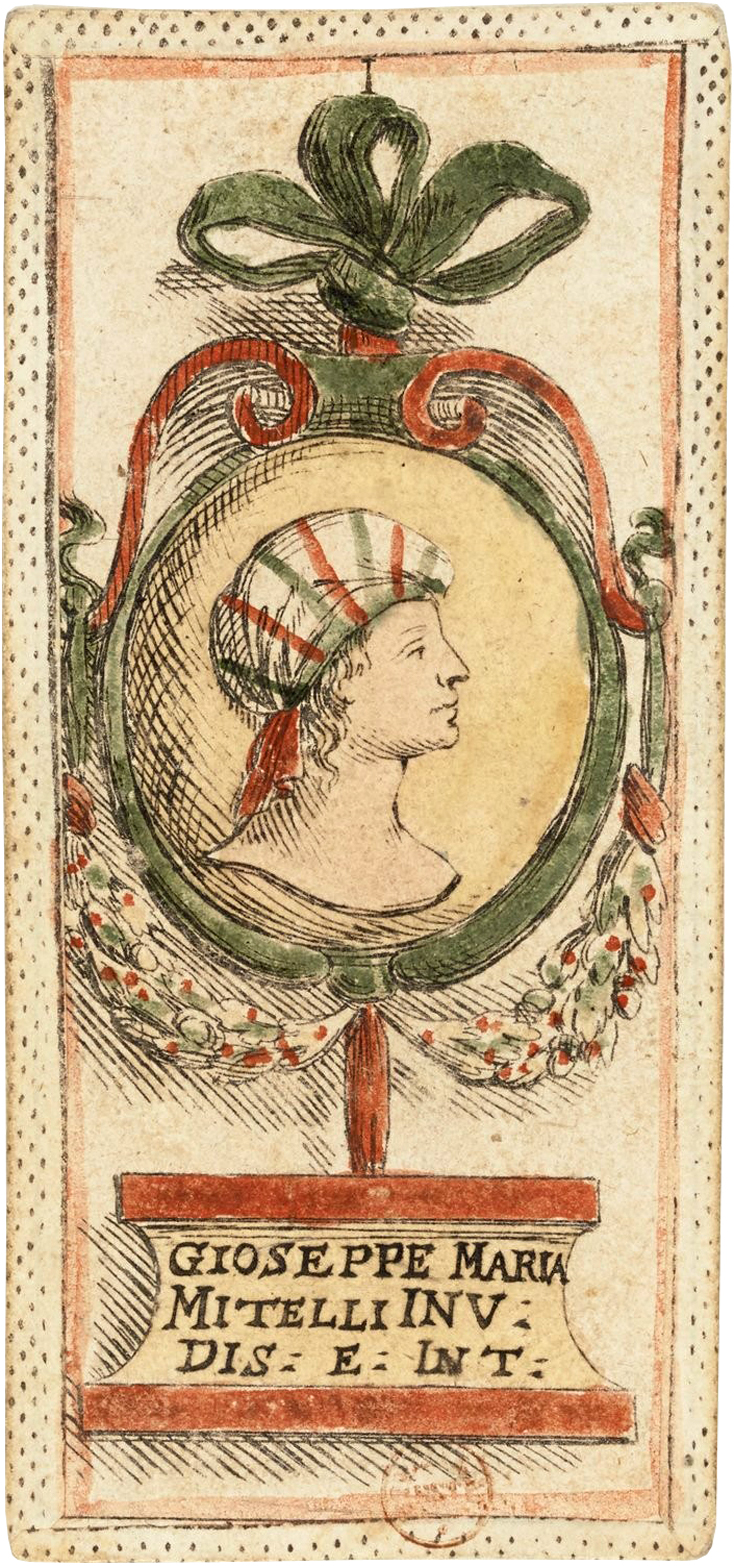
Self-portrait of G. M. Mitelli, etched on the Ace of Coins of his Tarot deck.

Around 1660 Giuseppe Maria Mitelli realized for Count Prospero Bentivoglio - a member of a powerful Bolognese family -, a Game of Tarot with a New form of Tarocchini (a variant of the classic Tarot). This artwork consists of 62 cards in typical Baroque style and it is still today considered one of the highest examples of Mitelli's artistic production.

Italian art historian Giordano Berti, in his study on Mitelli's life and work has defined the Mitelli's Tarocchino «a jewel of creativity, a flight of fantasy, a perfect stylistic exercise».

Mitelli placed his own self-portrait on the Ace of Coins and, to affirm the originality of his masterpiece, he added INV DIS & INT ("Invented, Drawn and Engraved").

== Other Images by Mitelli ==
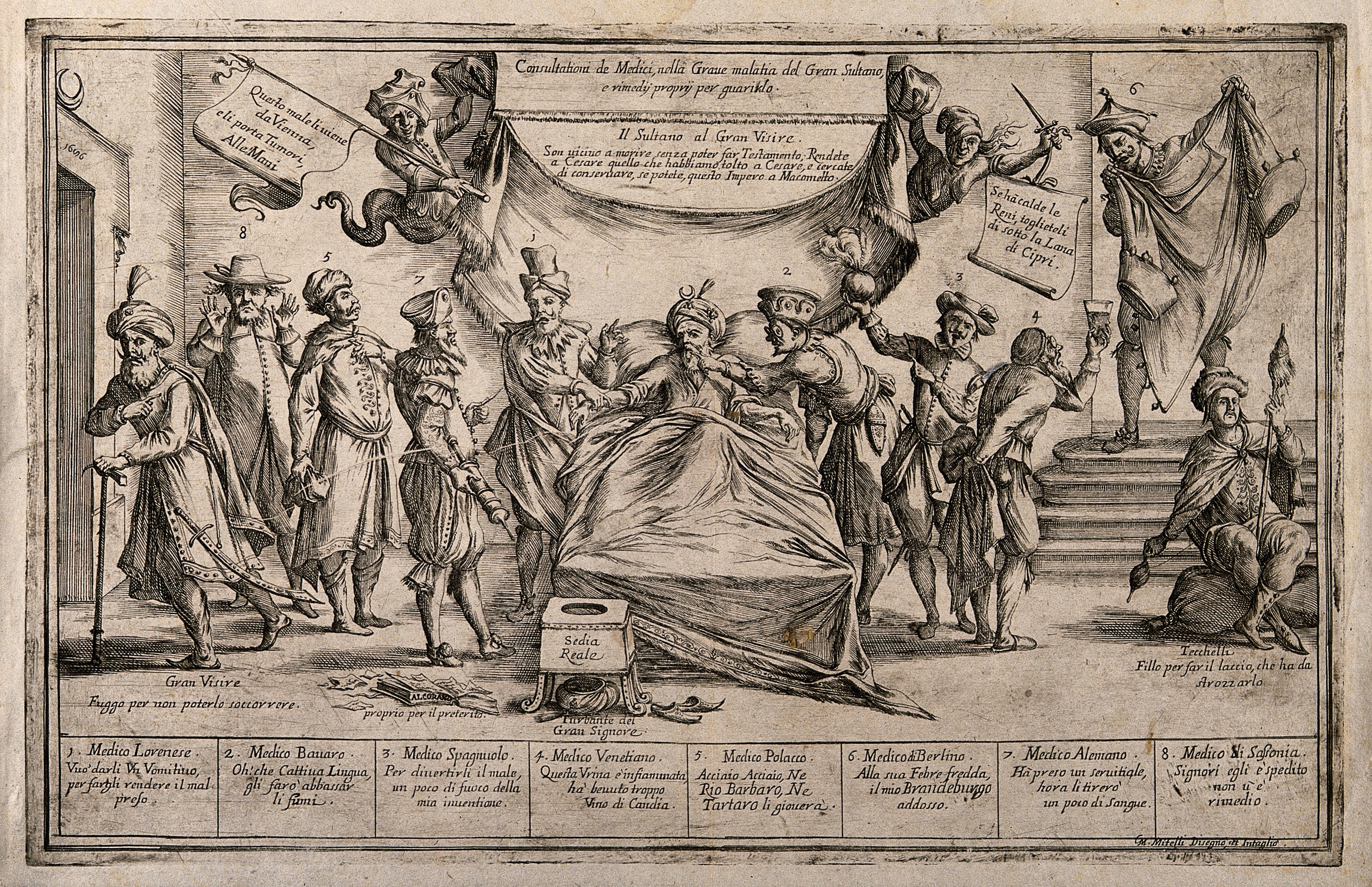
Doctors from various countries minister to the Dying Sultan.

He drew an enraged Imre Thököly in oriental garb behind bars (though it is unlikely that Mitelli would ever have seen the Hungarian rebel and Ottoman sympathiser as a prisoner in person). The Ottoman menace was still alive for Christian in this era.

In another cartoon, he mocks the assistance that foreign Doctors provide to a dying Ottoman Sultan. The etching contains the sultans hat under a commode, and a torn Koran. The dying sultan pleads to his parting Vizier to save his realm for Islam (see dying Sultan and doctors). This cartoon highlights the response of the European kingdoms in the signing of the Treaty of Karlowitz of 26 January 1699.

He also drew a laborer destroying a classical female statue. In 2010, an exhibition of 250 drawings and etchings were displayed in an exhibition titled Il mondo fantastico nelle incisioni di Giuseppe Maria Mitelli at the Galleria Garisenda (Strada Maggiore 14/a) of Bologna.
