= Matteo Borboni =

Italian painter

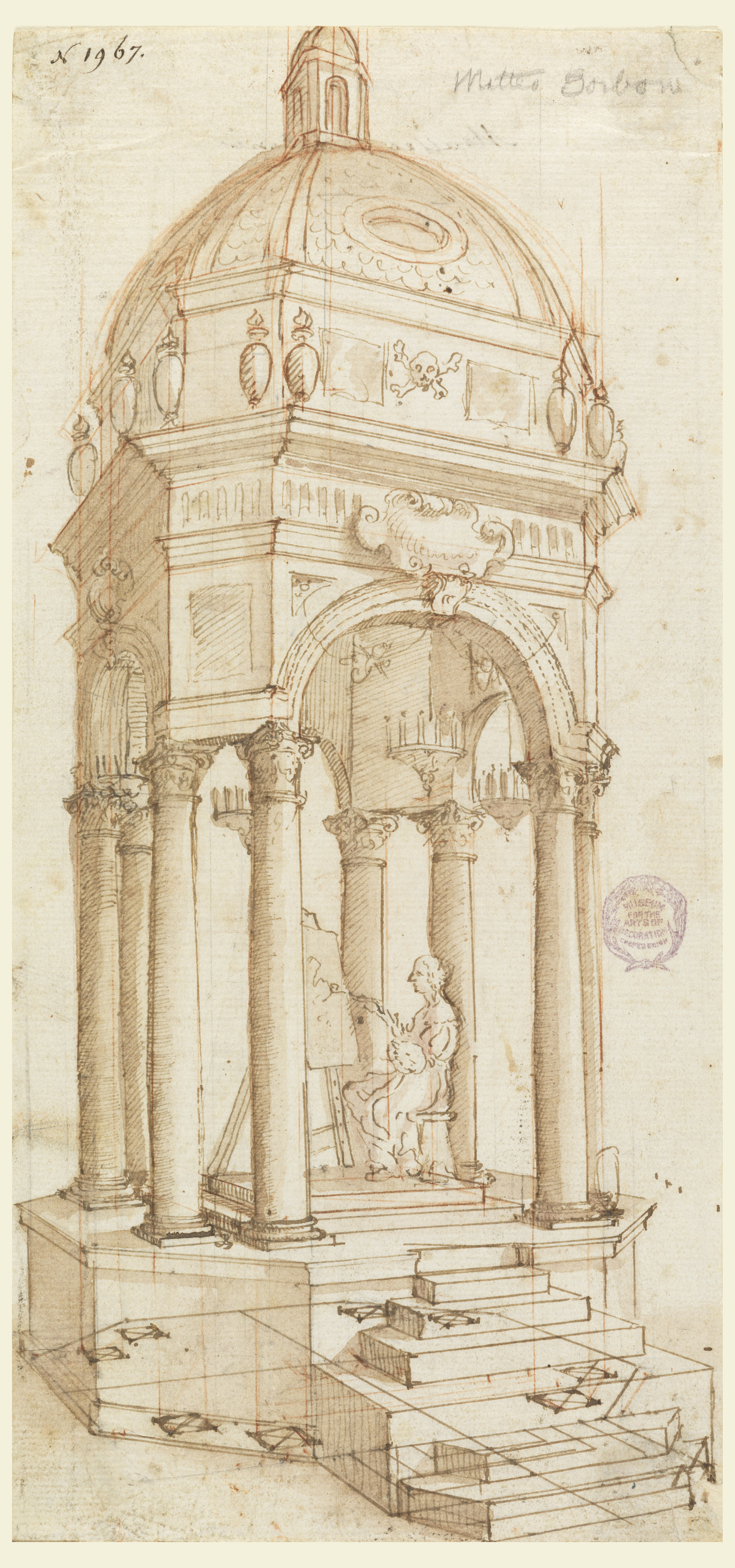
- Catafalque of Bolgonese artist Elisabetta Sirani, 1665, by Matteo Borboni
- Born: c. 1610; Bologna, Papal States (now Italy)
- Died: November 13, 1689 (aged 78–79); Bologna, Papal States (now Italy)
- Known for: Painting, fresco
- Movement: Baroque

Matteo Borboni or Borbone (c. 1610 – November 13, 1689) was an Italian painter, known for fresco depiction of quadratura during the Baroque period, active mainly in his native Bologna.

== Biography ==
Borboni was born in Bologna around 1610. According to Orlandi he was the brother of the architect Domenico Borboni. He began as a pupil of Gabriele Ferrantini, and later along with his lifelong friend Giovanni Andrea Sirani, a member of the studio of Giovanni Battista Cavazza. The friendship with Sirani was such that Borboni designed the catafalque for the exequeys of the painter Elisabetta Sirani that took place in San Domenico in 1665. The display was inspired by the main altar of San Petronio, that had been designed by Vignola.

Of his existing works, remains an Assumption of the Virgin located above the organ in the Basilica of Santa Maria dei Servi. He collaborated with Gioacchino Pizzoli in the decoration of the Palazzo Ducale of Mirandola and Ducal Palace of Parma. An inventory of his possessions, including drawings, paintings, and designs, was documented by the contemporary painter Paolo Antonio Paderna, and included engravings by Agostino Carracci; (a Passion after Tintoretto); Bartolomeo Coriolano (The Fall of Giants after Guido Reni); Antonio Tempesta; a portrait made of Guercino; and drawings or paintings by Ludovico Carracci; Carlo Volla; Antonio Dal Sole (il Monchino); and Benedetto Possenti.

He is described as also being active in Avignon, France at the behest of princes of Italy. Borboni died in Bologna on November 13, 1689.
