= Antonio Morandi =

Italian architect

Antonio Morandi, also called Il Terribilia (1508 – 1568) was an Italian architect of the late-Renaissance period.

He was born and died in Bologna, and was active there. He helped reconstruct San Procolo (1535-1557) and San Giacomo Maggiore, Bologna; and the palaces Bonasoni; Leoni; and of the Archiginnasio.

His son, Francesco Morandi or Marani (1528-1603) worked as an architect with Antonio, and is often referred to by the same nickname.
