= Francesco Quaini =

Italian painter (1611–1680)

Francesco Quaini (1611–1680) was an Italian painter of the Baroque period.

Born in Bologna, he started as a pupil of the renowned quadratura master, Agostino Mitelli. Working together with Marcantonio Franceschini, In Bologna, Francesco painted in several public buildings, including the decoration of the Sala Farnese in the Palazzo Publico. He died at Bologna. His son Luigi Quaini also painted quadratura. Marcantonio Chiarini was one of his pupils.
