= Giacomo Alboresi =

Italian painter

Giacomo Alboresi (1632–1677) was an Italian painter of the Baroque period.

== Biography ==
Born in Bologna, he was a pupil of Domenico Santi, under whom he worked seventeen years, devoting himself above all to the painting of birds and small figures in illuminated manuscripts. Then he moved to the studio of the quadratura painter Agostino Mitelli who instructed him in decorative fresco painting, and procured him commissions.

In 1659 he married the stepdaughter of Mitelli and, after the death of the master (1660), he was considered the heir of the decorative style that Mitelli had created. He limited himself to repeating diligently designs of his master. Later he worked under Angelo Michele Colonna in Spain, Florence, and Parma.

Colonna and Alboresi used painters Fulgenzio Mondini, and later Giulio Cesare Milani, and Canuti, to place figures in their backgrounds. Examples of the collaboration of Colonna, Alboresi and Canuti can be found at the Palazzo Felicini. He worked with Mondini in the decoration of the chapel depicting the Death and Canonization of St Anthony of Padua for the San Petronio Basilica at Bologna. In the church of San Giacomo Maggiore, he painted some subjects of perspective, in which the figures were painted by Bartolommeo Passarotti. He also worked in conjunction with Antonio Maria Pasio in the Cathedral of Florence.
