= Fulgenzio Mondini =

17th-century Italian painter

- Born: 17th century Bologna, Italy
- Died: 17th century Florence, Italy
- Education: Guercino
- Known for: Historical painting, frescoes
- Notable work: Frescoes, Life of St Anthony of Padua, San Petronio, Bologna (1658)
- Movement: Baroque

Fulgenzio Mondini was an Italian painter of the Baroque era, active in the 17th century.

He was born at Bologna, and was active there in 1658. He excelled in delineating historical subjects, and studied under Guercino. He painted some frescoes depicting Life of St Anthony of Padua for San Petronio.

Malvasia speaks very highly of Mondini. Mondini painted figures for Giacomo Alboresi in frescoes. The painter died in Florence, where he was working for Marchese Capponi in his villa at Colonnata, in the prime of life.
