= Gabriello Ferrantini =

Italian painter

- Known for: Painting
- Movement: Baroque

Gabriello Ferrantini, also known as Gabriel degli Occhiali, was an Italian painter of the Baroque period, active mainly in Bologna who flourished in a period beginning in 1644. He was a pupil of the painter Denis Calvaert and Francesco Gessi. Among his pupils were Matteo Borboni and Michelangelo Colonna. Ferrantini was primarily known for painted sacred figures using the Fresco technique.
