= Giovanni Pietro Possenti =

Italian painter

Giovanni Pietro Possenti (1618–1659) was an Italian painter of the Baroque period, active mainly as a battle painter. He was the son and pupil of Benedetto Possenti, who also was known as a painter of battle scenes. He also painted altarpieces for the churches at Bologna, Padua, Milan, and San Lorenzo, Padua.
