= Girolamo Curti =

Italian painter (1575–1632)

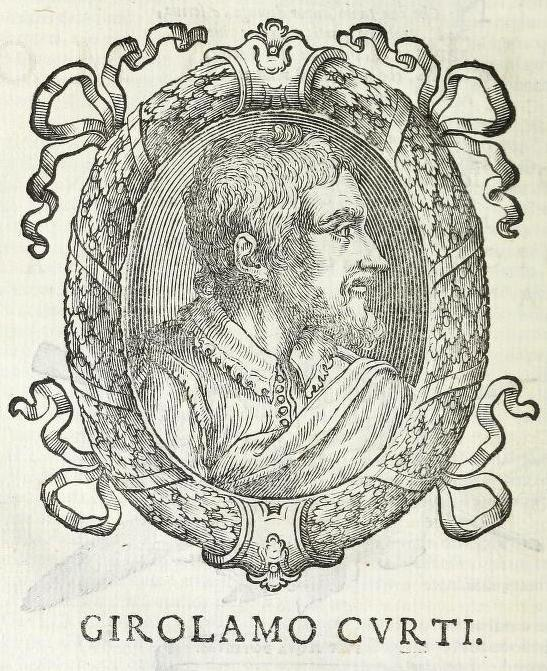
- Engraved portrait of Girolamo Curti
- Born: 7 April 1575; Bologna, Papal States
- Died: 18 December 1632 (aged 57); Bologna, Papal States
- Known for: Painter
- Movement: Late Mannerist, Baroque

Girolamo Curti (7 April 1575 – 18 December 1632) was an Italian painter of the early-Baroque, specializing in quadratura. He was also called il Dentone.

== Biography ==
Girolamo Curti was born to a poor family in Bologna, and worked for a cloth spinner till the age of 25. His first formal training was with the Cremonese painter Cesare Baglioni (no evident relation to Giovanni Baglione). He apparently quickly worked independently, then rejoined his friend and fellow Bolognese and Baglione pupil, Lionello Spada. Together during the early 17th century, they began to collaborate in quadratura, with Curti painting the structures, while Spada painted the figures. They soon parted, with Spada becoming a canvas painter, and Curti was to travel to paint in Modena, Parma (1618 and 1630), Rome (1623) and Genoa. He returned from Rome to Bologna, and there was assisted by Michelangelo Colonna, Agostino Mitelli, and Andrea Seghizzi, and painted architectural backgrounds for Guercino frescoes. Much of his work has been lost over the centuries.

The main source of his biography is Cesare Malvasia, whose father's villa at Trebbio was frescoed by Curti and assistants.
