= Domenico Santi =

Italian painter

Domenico Santi (1621–1694), also known as il Mengazzino, was an Italian painter, active in Modena, Mirandola, and Novellara, painting quadratura.

== Biography ==
He was a pupil of Agostino Mitelli in Bologna. He moved to Mirandola in 1654. Among the pupils of Santi was Giacomo Alboresi,
