= Agostino Mitelli =

Italian painter (1609–1660)

Agostino Mitelli (16 March 1609 – 2 August 1660) was an Italian painter of the Baroque period and best known as a fresco painter of quadratura or illusionistic perspectival architectural frameworks.

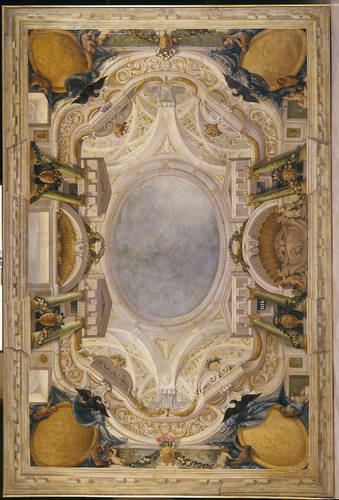
Model for ceiling at Buen Retiro Palace

== Biography ==
Agostino Mitelli was born in Battedizzo, near Bologna, and died in Madrid while working for the court of Philip IV of Spain. He was a pupil of Gabriello Ferrantini (degli Occhiali) and Girolamo Curti. He had a long and fruitful collaboration with Michelangelo Colonna in northern and central Italy; Colonna principally executed the figurative elements and Mitelli, the quadratura framework. Examples of his quadratura can be found at Bologna, Parma, Modena, Florence, Rome, and Genoa, testifying to the popularity of the style. Colonna and Mitelli even travelled to Madrid, in 1658, to help decorate the Royal Alcazar and the Palace of Buen Retiro. Mitelli died in Madrid. He also published some etchings in a manuscript entitled Freggi dell'architettura da Agostino Mitelli.

Through his numerous pupils who spread out through Italy and Europe, Mitelli exerted a strong influence on the 'school' of quadratura painting. His son Giuseppe Maria Mitelli (1634–1718) was also a painter and engraver. Two of his daughters married pupils of his; Baldassare Bianchi was mainly active in Mantua, and Giacomo Alboresi was mainly active in Parma and Florence. Giovanni Paderna, Bianchi's first master, had been a follower of Mitelli. Giovanni Giacomo Monti, a partner of Bianchi, was Mitelli's pupil. Giacomo Friani; Domenico Santi, known as Mengazzino; Francesco Quaino; and Andrea Montecelli were also Mitelli's pupils.

== Bibliography ==
- Farquhar, Maria (1855). Ralph Nicholson Wornum (ed.). Biographical catalogue of the principal Italian painters. London: Woodfall & Kinder. p. 106.
- Marchese Antonio Bolognini Amorini (1843). "Parte Quinta". Vite de' Pittori ed Artifici Bolognesi. Tipografia Governativa alla Volpe, Bologna. pp. 291–324.
