= Benedetto Possenti =

Italian painter

Benedetto Possenti (active in the 17th century) was an Italian painter of the Baroque period, active mainly as a battle painter, as well of seaports, landscapes, and festivals. He was a pupil of the Carracci. His son, Giovanni Pietro Possenti, was also a painter of similar themes.
