= Giovanni Giacomo Monti =

Italian painter

Giovanni Giacomo Monti (born 1692) was an Italian painter of the Baroque period.

He trained with Agostino Mitelli, the pre-eminent quadratura painter from Bologna. Monti became a colleague of Baldassare Bianchi, Mitelli's son-in-law. This partnership also met with success particularly at Mantua, where they both received regular salaries from the Ducal Court. Their figure-painter was Giovanni Battista Caccioli of Budrio, pupil to Domenico Maria Canuti and a follower of Carlo Cignani.
