= Angelo Michele Colonna =

Italian painter (1604–1687)

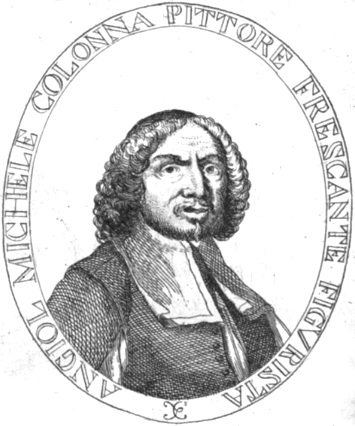
- Born: 21 September 1604; Rovenna, Como, Duchy of Milan
- Died: 11 March 1687 (aged 82); Bologna, Papal States
- Known for: Painting
- Movement: Baroque

Angelo Michele Colonna (21 September 1604 – 11 March 1687) was an Italian painter of the Baroque period, active in Bologna, northern and central Italy and Spain. He is sometimes referred to as Michelangelo Colonna.

== Biography ==
He was born in Rovenna, a small village near Como, Lombardy. As a boy in Como, he worked with a painter by the name of Caprera. By 1617, he travelled to Bologna to apprentice with Gabriello Ferrantini or Gabriel degli Occhiali, and then the early quadratura master, Girolamo Curti, called il Dentone.

He painted frescoes for the Palazzo Albergati in Bologna. He would have been known by the biographer of Bolognese artists, Cesare Malvasia, for whom Colonna frescoed the Villa Malvasia in Trebbo in 1624, along with Curti and Domenico Ambrogi. The following year, Curti and Colonna frescoed parts of the Villa Paleotti (now Villa Monari-Sardè). Also in 1625, along with Ambrogi, he carried out frescoes in the Villa Malvezzi-Campeggi in Bagnarola and after being recommended by Alessandro Tiarini, he helped to decorate the ceiling of the church of Sant'Alessandro in Parma. In 1625, he collaborated with Lucio Massari, Francesco Gessi and others in the decoration of the Oratory of San Rocco in Bologna, painting six of the saints and allegories. In 1627, he painted in San Michele in Bosco.

After Curti died in 1632, Colonna began a long collaboration with the skilled quadratura painter Agostino Mitelli until 1660. Together they contributed to the decorations of the Palazzo Spada in Rome, and then painted in the Pitti Palace in Florence, including a large fresco of the 'Fame of the Medici crowned by Glory'.

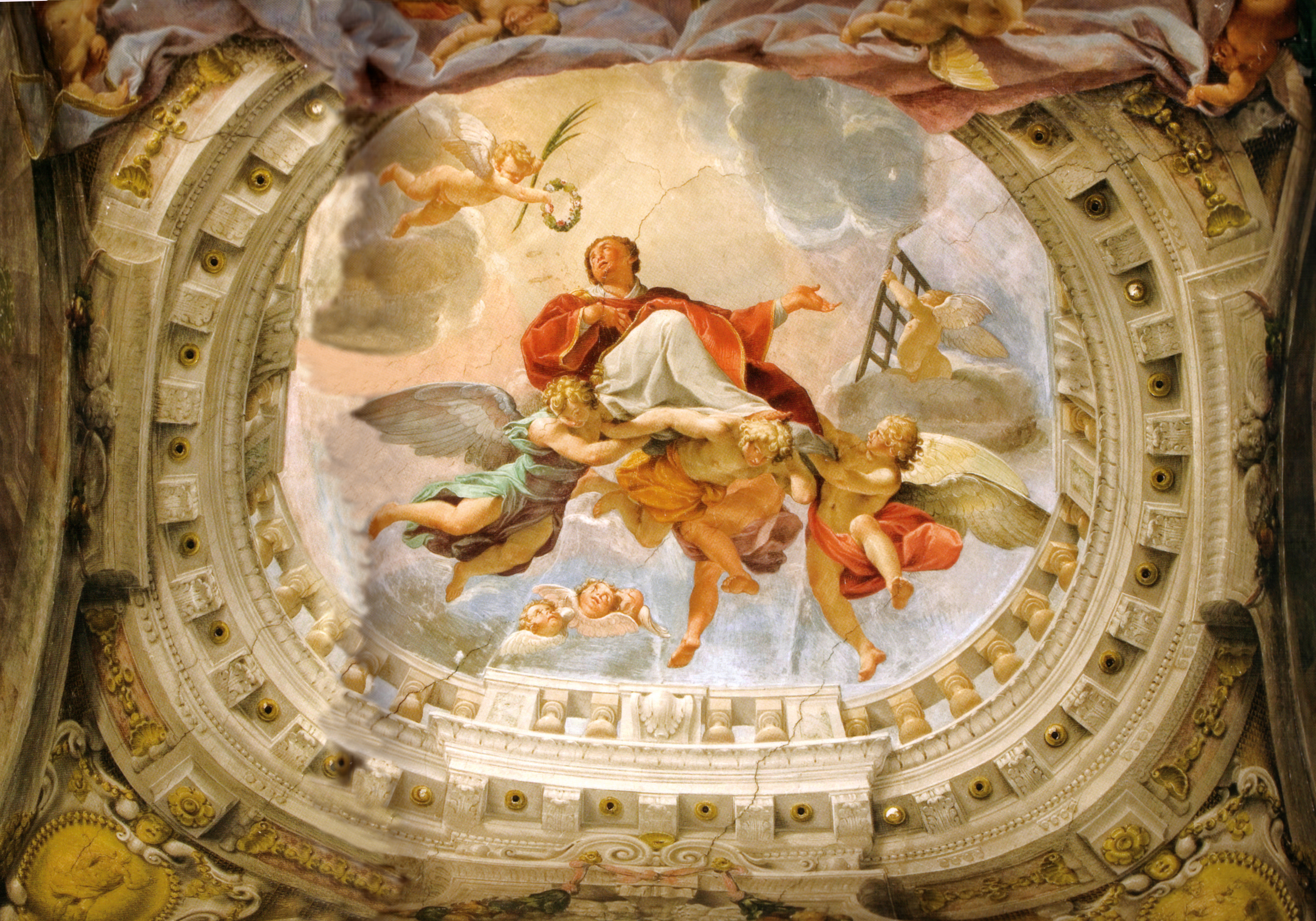
Angelo Michele Colonna, Gloria of Saint Lawrence, column of the Archangel Michael

They became the pre-eminent quadratura fresco painters of northern Italy with Colonna principally executing the figurative elements and Mitelli, the quadratura or illusionistic architectural frameworks: in Modena, they painted in the Este palace at Sassuolo; they executed the ceiling of the now destroyed Oratorio de San Girolamo of Rimini; in 1657 they carried out the decoration of the chapel of the Rosary in the basilica of San Domenico in Bologna, including a framed 'Assumption of the Virgin'; and between 1653 and 1658, they painted the gallery leading to the High Altar of San Michele in Bosco.

In 1658, Colonna and Mitelli were called to Spain to work for Philip IV of Spain; both painters had initially been contracted for this work by Diego Velázquez. Unfortunately all their collaborative work there, including the Pandora ceiling in the Hall of Mirrors in the Royal Alcázar of Madrid, has been destroyed. Mitelli died in Madrid in 1660, and Colonna returned to Bologna in 1662, where he began collaborating with Mitelli's pupil, Giacomo Alboresi (1632–1677).

Colonna continued to be prolific in Bologna, decorating several palaces, including the Palazzo Cospi Ferretti. His later collaborations varied in quality, the finest being two ceiling frescoes in the Palazzo Albergati at Zola Predosa, Bologna (1665). In his last two decorative schemes, realized with the collaboration of Gioacchino Pizzoli, the nave ceiling of Santi Bartolomeo e Gaetano (1667), and the vault of the Council Hall of Palazzo d'Accursio, the town hall of Bologna, (1677), he reverted to the dominant academic tradition of Bolognese quadratura.

Colonna died at Bologna in 1687, aged 82. Giuseppe Romani was one of his apprentices.

== Gallery ==
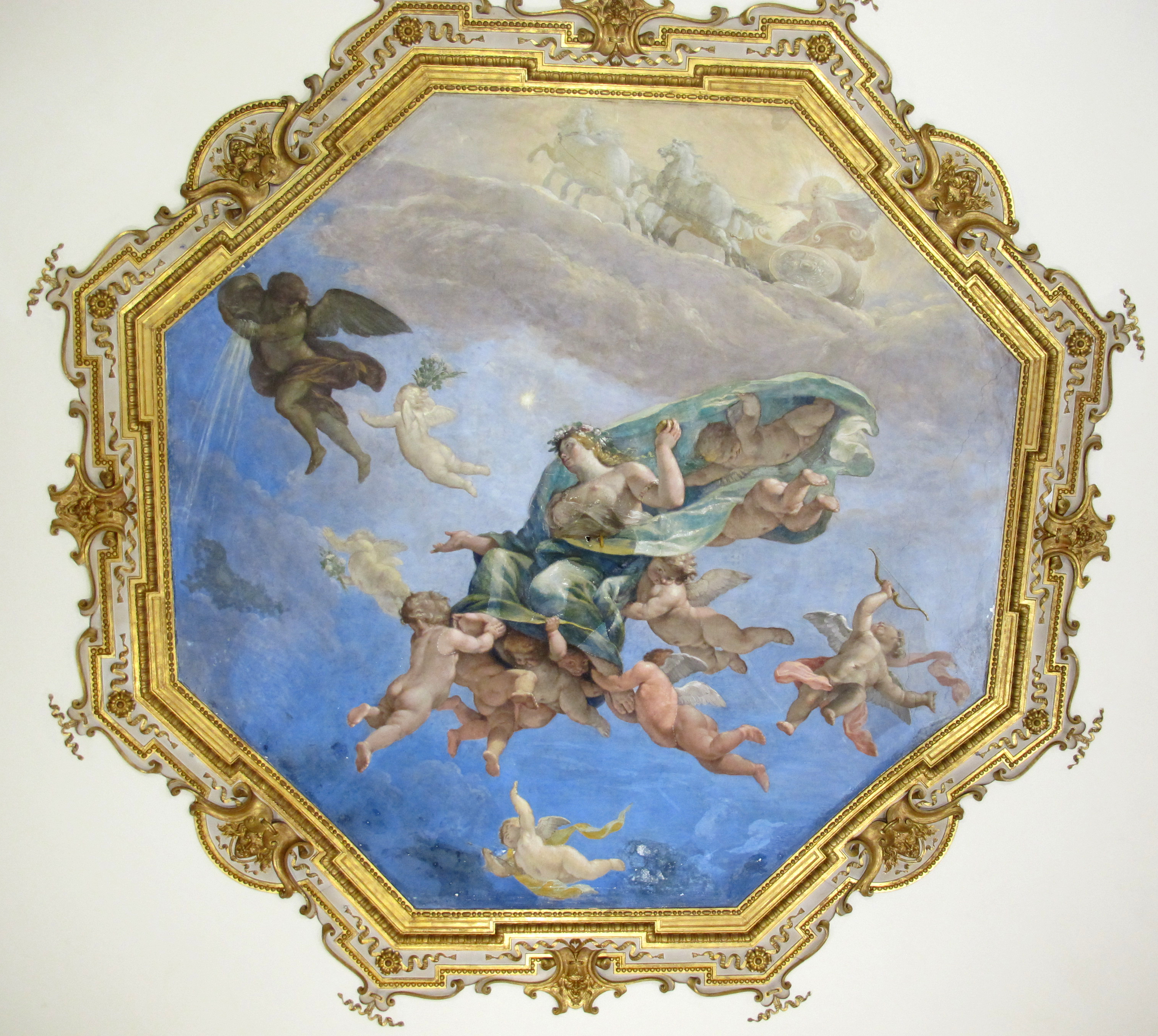
Aurora, Palazzo Venturi Ginori, Florence

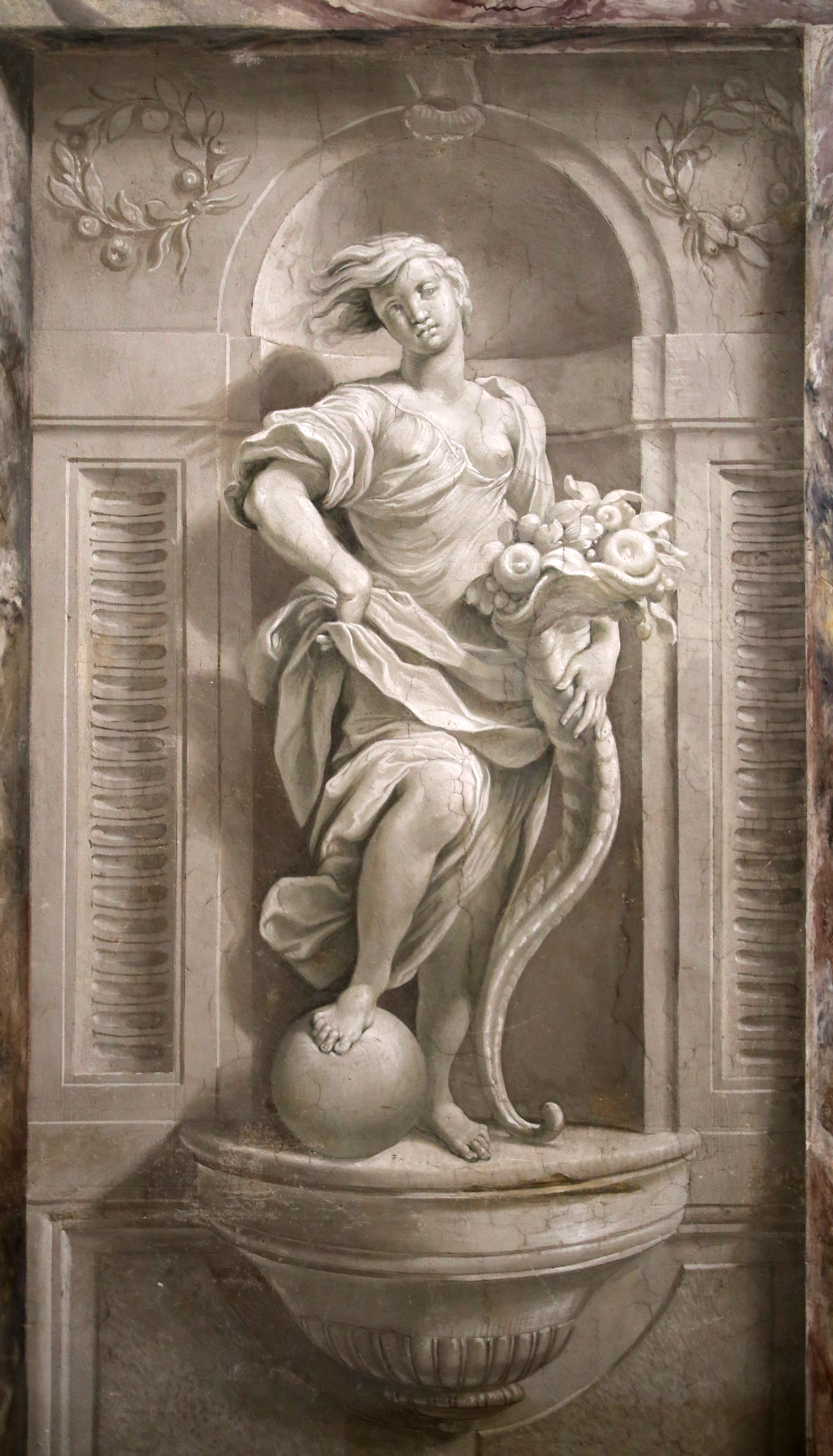
Allegory of Fortune, fresco in the Sala dell'Udienza Privata, Palazzo Pitti, Florence

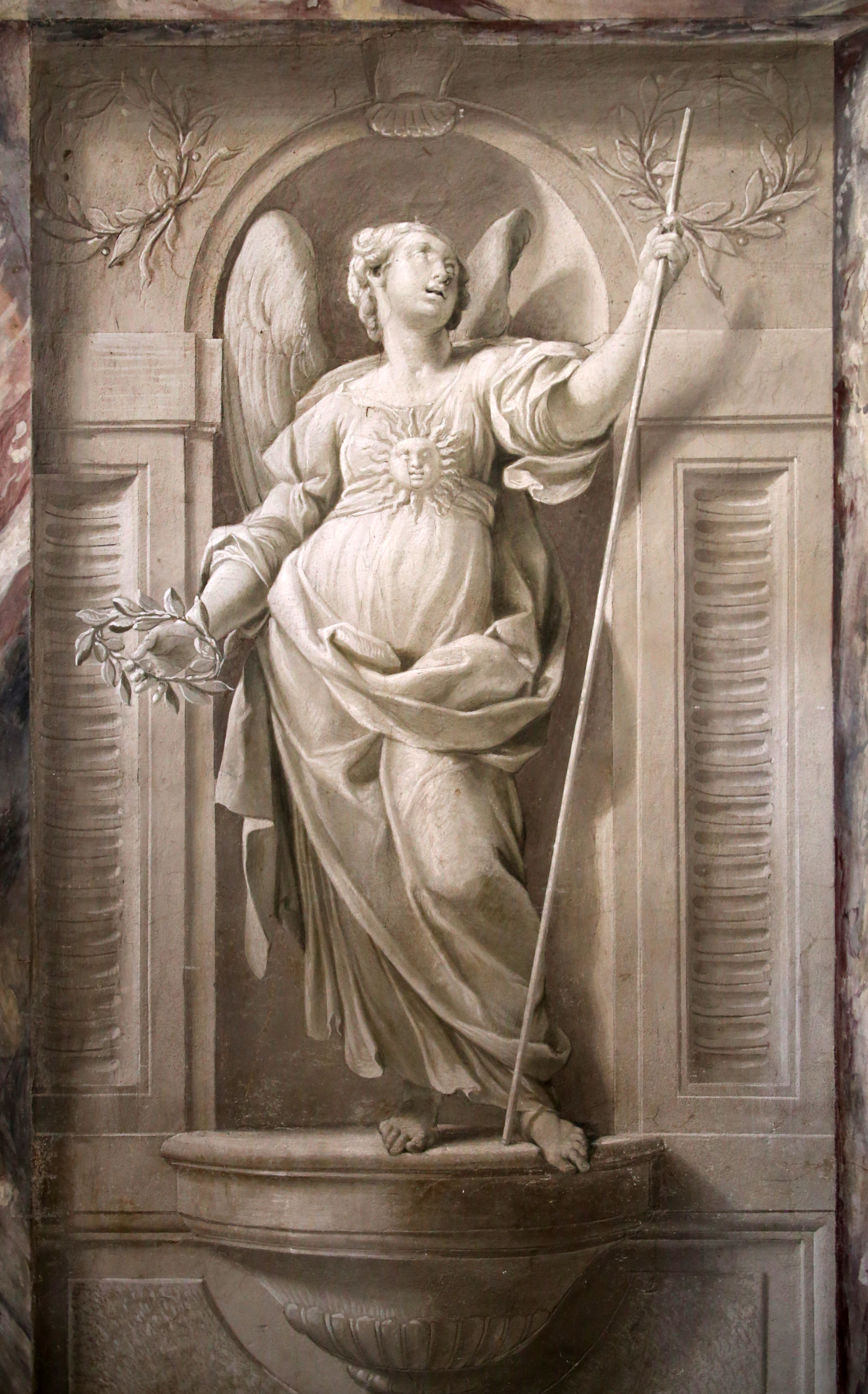
Allegory of Fame, fresco in the Sala dell'Udienza Privata, Palazzo Pitti, Florence

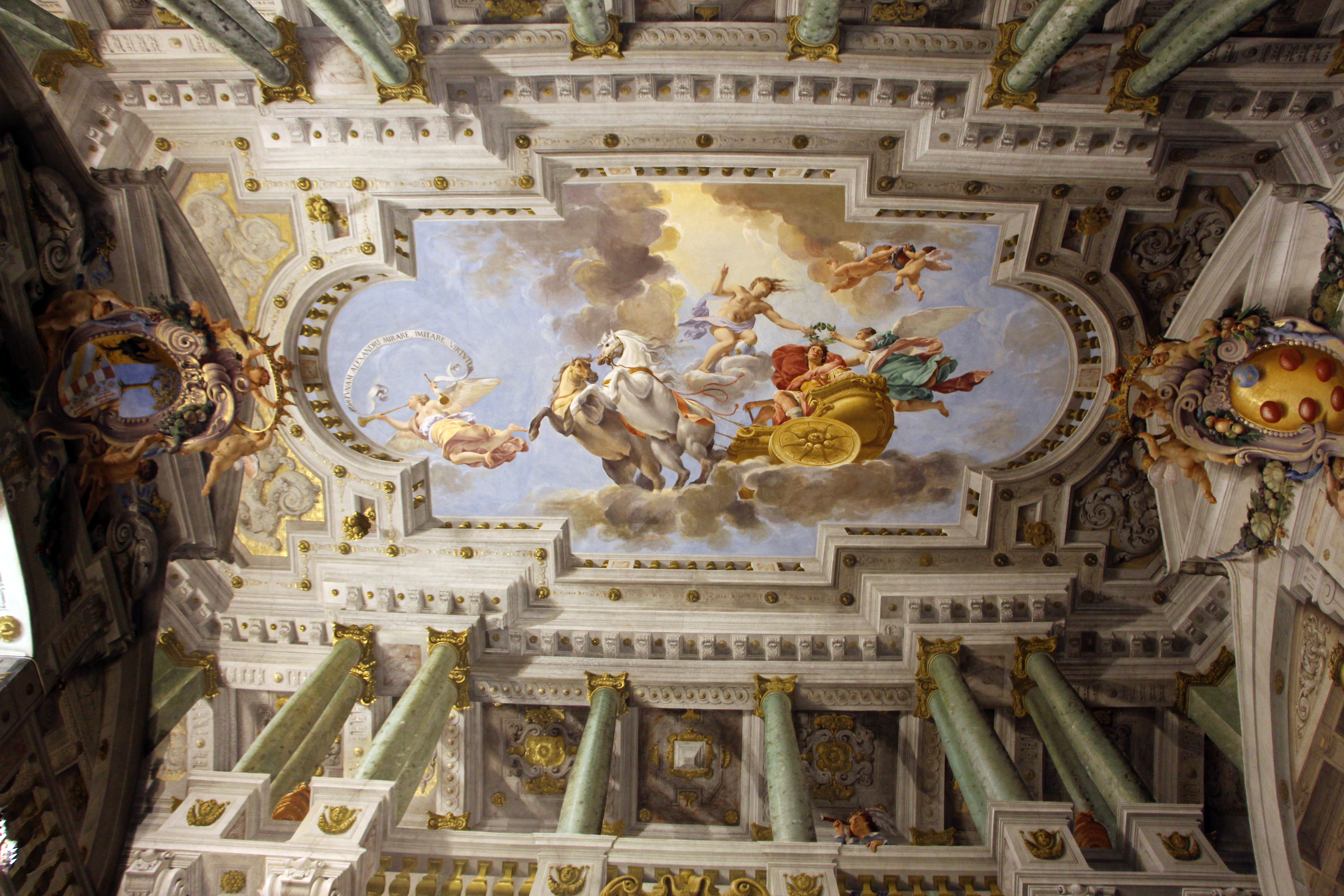
Apotheosis of Alexander the Great, ceiling of the Sala dell'Udienza Privata, Palazzo Pitti, Florence

== Sources ==
- Farquhar, Maria (1855). Ralph Nicholson Wornum (ed.). Biographical catalogue of the principal Italian painters. London: Woodfall & Kinder. p. 48.
- Anales de Historia del Arte ISSN 0214-6452 1998. 8:197-222; Angelo Michele Colonna: sus aportaciones à la pintura barroca decorativa en Italia by Aida Anguiano de Miguel.
- Marchese Antonio Bolognini Amorini (1843). "Parte Quinta". Vite de Pittori ed Artifici Bolognesi. Tipografia Governativa alla Volpe, Bologna. pp. 324–344.
