= Gioseffo =

Gioseffo is an Italian given name. Notable people with the name include:

- Gioseffo Maria Bartolini (1657–1725), Italian painter of the late-Baroque period
- Gioseffo Danedi (1618–1689), Italian painter of the late-Renaissance period
- Gioseffo Guami (1542–1611), Italian composer, organist, violinist and singer
- Gioseffo Mazzoni (1678–1763), Italian painter, active in a late-Baroque style
- Gioseffo Maria Rolli (1643–1695), Italian painter active during the Baroque period
- Giovanni Gioseffo dal Sole (1654–1719), Italian painter and engraver in the late-Baroque period
- Gioseffo Vitali (active 1700), Italian painter of the late-Baroque period
- Gioseffo Zarlino (1517–1590), Italian music theorist and composer of the Renaissance
