= Luca Antonio Bistega =

Italian painter (1672–1732)

Luca Antonio Bistega or Luca Bestega (21 October 1672 – 8 June 1732) was an Italian painter of quadratura, active mainly in Bologna, Italy.

== Biography ==
He initially trained with a little-known painter, Barlamo Castellini, but soon moved to work with the team of Giacomo Antonio Mannini and Marcantonio Chiarini. In 1702–1705, he painted a large hall and various rooms in the Palazzo Martinenghi of Brescia. He returned to Bologna where he was employed in the Casa Agucchi. In 1706, alongside Gaetano Bertuzzi, he painted in the church of the Padri Camaldolesi of Faenza. In Piacenza, he painted alongside Marcantonio Franceschini and Luigi Quaini. Along with Francesco Monti he painted the main chapel of the parish church of Santa Maddalena, and then beginning with Giacomo Boni, and later with Giacinto Garofalini, they decorated the Church of the Celestini. With Boni he had painted quadratura for San Bernardino del Lavino.

With Garofalini, he painted for a fresco of Venus caressing Love for Casa Ghisilieri. With Gioseffo Roli, he painted in the monastery of the Carita. He painted quadratura for one of the chapels of the Portico di San Luca; the figure painter Gioseffo Mazzoni painted the Virgin presenting the infant Jesus to Simon the Elder. Along with Garofalini, a figure painter, he painted the chapel in San Tommaso del Mercato, Bologna. In the main chapel of the church of Madonna di Galliera, he painted alongside Giuseppe Marchesi. Other works are seen in Imola, in Forlì, in Ravenna, and Fano.

Like many a ceiling fresco artist, Luca suffered a number of severe falls from scaffolds. After one of the falls, he developed a stroke, from which he died. His son Giuseppe was also a painter.
