= Giovanni Battista Grati =

Italian painter (1681–1758)

Self-portrait, Floeence, Uffizi

Giovanni Battista Grati (8 August 1681 – 1758) was an Italian painter from Bologna, Papal States, active in the late-Baroque period.

== Biography ==
Grati apprenticed with Giovanni Gioseffo Dal Sole. After traveling to various cities, including Bolzano and Cortona, he returned to Bologna in 1719, and was named Prince of the Accademia Clementina. His election followed the death of the first Prince of this Academy, the by-then elderly Carlo Cignani. The young Grati nominated Marcantonio Franceschini as vice-prince, and had a board of directors consisting of Antonio Burrini, Felice Torelli, Donato Creti, Angelo Michele Cavazzoni, Andrea Ferreri, Giuseppe Carpi, Ferdinando Bibiena, and Luca Bistega. He taught figure painting for many years.
