= Comi =

Comi is a surname. Notable people with the surname include:

- Anne Comi, American pediatric neurologist
- Antonio Comi (born 1964), Italian footballer
- Francesco Comi (1682–1769), Italian painter
- Gianmario Comi (born 1992), Italian footballer
- Girolamo Comi (1507–1581), Italian painter
- Lara Comi (born 1983), Italian politician
- Paul Comi (1932–2016), American actor
