= Dionigi =

Dionigi is both a masculine Italian given name and a surname. Notable people with the name include:

- Dionigi di Borgo San Sepolcro (c. 1300 – 1342), Augustinian friar
- Dionigi Bussola (1615–1687), Italian sculptor
- Dionigi Donnini (1681–1743), Italian painter
- Dionigi Galletto (1932–2011), Italian mathematician
- Dionigi da Palacenza Carli, 17th-century Capuchin missionary
- Dionigi Tettamanzi (1934–2017), Italian cardinal
- Dionigi Valesi (c.1730–c.1780), Italian printmaker
- Davide Dionigi (born 1974), Italian footballer and manager
- Marianna Candidi Dionigi (1756-1826), Italian painter, writer and salonnière
