= Giovanni Antonio Burrini =

Italian painter

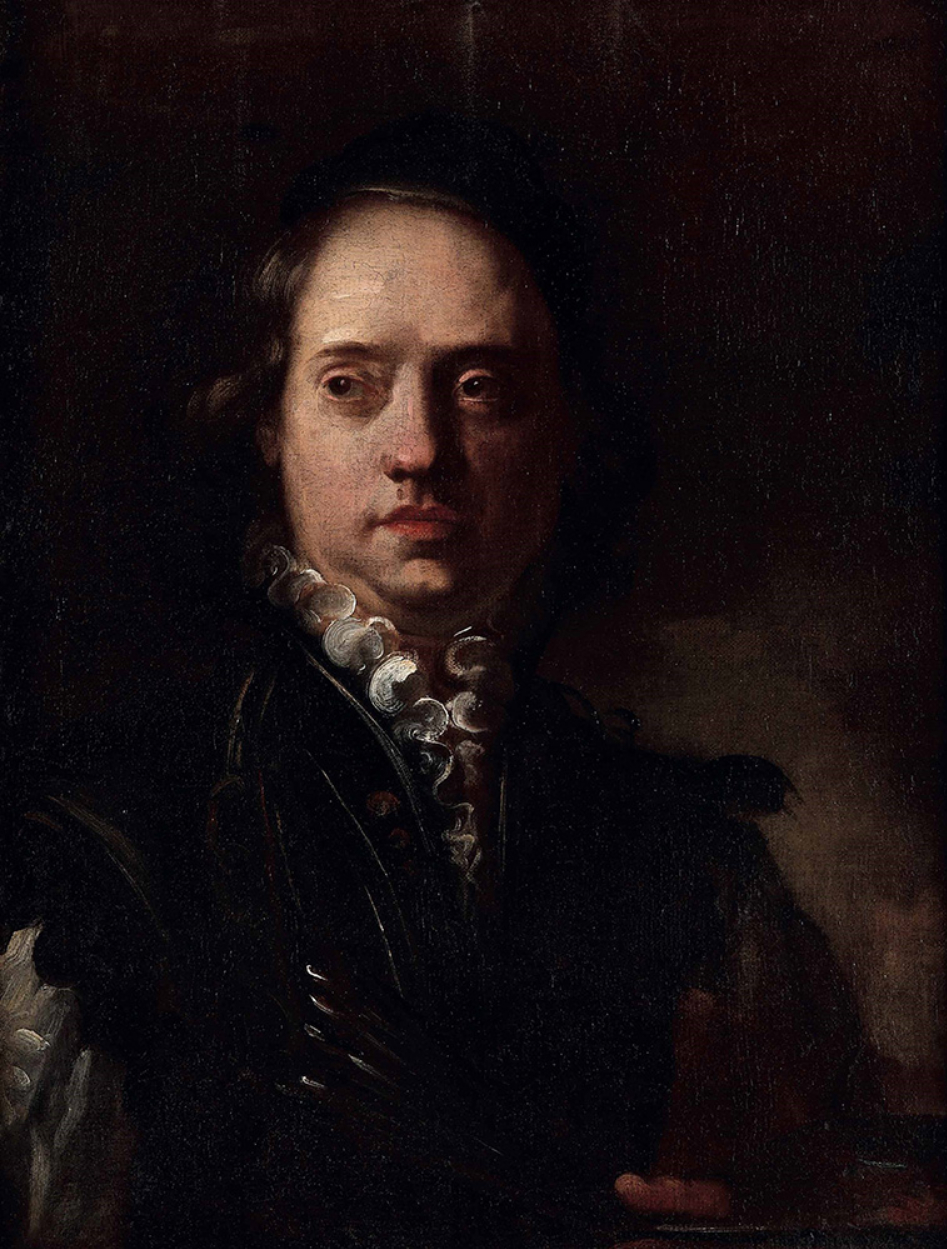
- Self-portrait
- Born: 25 April 1656; Bologna, Papal States
- Died: 5 January 1727 (aged 70); Bologna, Italy
- Known for: Painting
- Movement: Late-Baroque; Rococo

Giovanni Antonio Burrini (25 April 1656 – 5 January 1727) was a Bolognese painter of Late-Baroque or Rococo style. He was one of the founding members of the Accademia Clementina in Bologna. Burrini was a rival and competitor of Sebastiano Ricci.

== Biography ==
=== Early life and education ===
After an apprenticeship with Domenico Maria Canuti, he went to work under Lorenzo Pasinelli with fellow student, Giovanni Gioseffo dal Sole. He became an early friend and often close collaborator with Giuseppe Maria Crespi, with whom he shared a studio. Burrini received generous help from his patron, Giulio Cesare Venenti, himself an amateur engraver, who supported these studies for several years and also offered his protégé lodging in his residence. Around 1672, he visited Venice, where he studied the paintings of Titian and Paolo Veronese.

=== Early career ===
Burrini began as a fresco decorator; he usually collaborated with a quadratura specialist, and his earliest work of this type, a frieze of small wall paintings in the Casa Marchesini, Bologna, was carried out with the assistance of the quadraturista Marcantonio Chiarini. Among his earliest known works are his most brilliant surviving frescoes: the ceiling decorations (1681–4) for six rooms in the Villa Albergati at Zola Predosa, near Bologna, again with quadratura settings by Chiarini. These frescoes show mythological scenes, including the Fall of the Giants, and are distinguished by their bold and brilliant Baroque illusionism and rich colouring.

=== Maturity ===
In 1688 Burrini decorated the Franchi Chapel in the Bolognese church of San Giorgio in Poggiale and in the same year, on the invitation of Emmanuel Philibert, Prince of Carignano, went to Turin accompanied by the quadraturista Tommaso Aldrovandini, though nothing now remains of their work there.

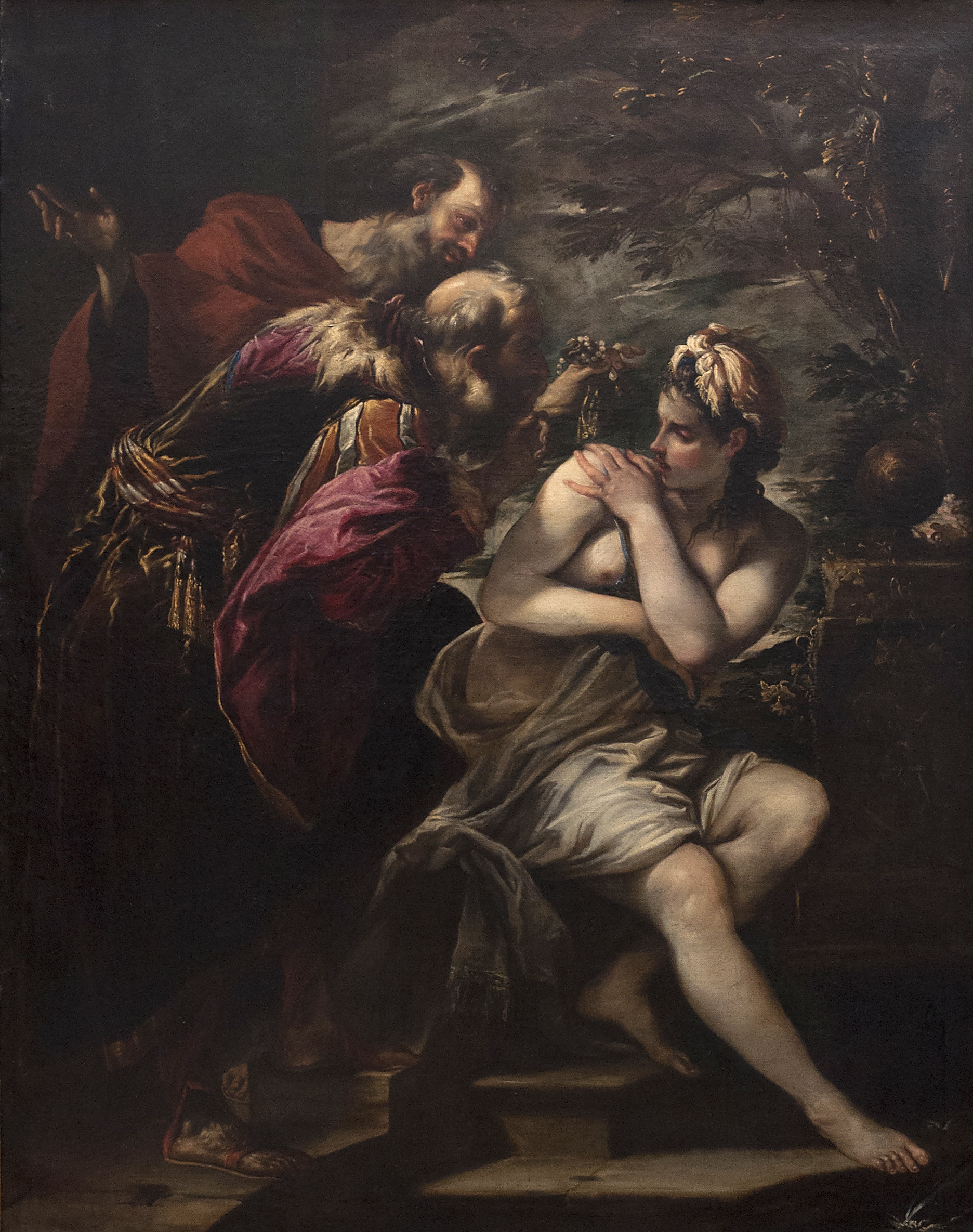
Susanna and the Elders, Pinacoteca Nazionale di Bologna

Burrini’s paintings of the late 1680s and early 1690s are extraordinarily free and spontaneous in execution and markedly Venetian in style. They show a variety of subjects from biblical history, such as Susanna and the Elders (c. 1686–90; Paris, priv. col.), and scenes from mythology and epic poetry, such as Erminia and the Shepherds (c. 1686–90; Pinacoteca Nazionale di Bologna) and Diana and Endymion (c. 1690; York Art Gallery). The Erminia and a Bacchus and Ariadne (early 1690s; priv. col.) have landscape settings loosely brushed with liquid impastos that reveal Burrini’s unusual capacity in this regard. In the Landscape with St. Jerome, where a small figure of St. Jerome is seen in a vast landscape panorama, he developed the landscape more extensively. Zanotti noted that this picture was inspired by Titian’s St. Jerome (Paris, Louvre).

Burrini also executed zestful oil sketches of heads in genre-like groupings, such as the Genre Scene (Pinacoteca Nazionale di Bologna). In 1690, with Chiarini, Burrini executed huge wall paintings and a ceiling painting in the salone of the Palazzo Pini Alamandini, Bologna, with scenes from the Myth of Phaeton and representations of the Continents and the Elements. These are less daring and less Baroque than his earlier frescoes, and closer to the Bolognese classical tradition.

The period 1680–95 was the most felicitous and productive of Burrini’s career. In 1696, at the age of 40, he married and was thereafter weighed down with the responsibility of a large family. Zanotti, who knew him well, said that this caused him to paint with less thought. He was further demoralized by his estrangement from his daughter Barbara, whom he had taught to be a painter. Letters survive that pathetically reflect this dissension in the artist’s family (Bologna, Biblioteca comunale dell'Archiginnasio, Autografi XI no. 3424).

=== Later career ===
Zanotti’s assertions about Burrini’s decline are unverifiable as little survives of the artist’s later work. His Martyrdom of St. Catherine (Bologna, Santa Caterina di Saragozza), however, is a vigorous work, described as ‘una delle ultime opere’ in Malvasia/Zanotti Le pitture di Bologna (1732). Burrini was among the artists who founded the Accademia Clementina in Bologna in 1709. He took an active part in its affairs and was its seventh director (1723–4). Among his pupils was Bartolomeo Mercati.

== Partial anthology of works ==
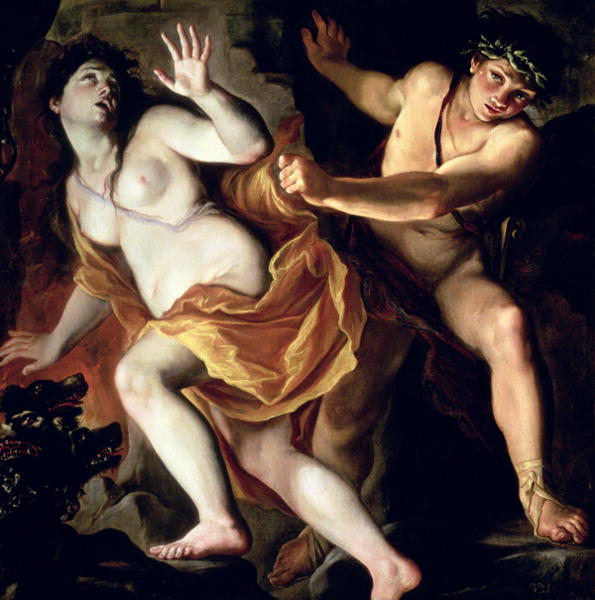
Orpheus and Eurydice, Kunsthistorisches Museum, Vienna

- Joseph Interpreting Dreams (Muzeum, Warsaw)
- Samson and Delilah
- Martyrdom of Saint Victoria
- Fresco Cycle (Villa Albergata, Zola Predosa)
- Martyrdom of Saint Euphemia (1686, Chiesa Saint Euphemia, Ravenna)
- Frescoes (Palazzo Ruini, Bologna)
- Frescoes (San Giovanni Battista dei Celestini, Bologna)
- Susannah and the Elders (Pinacoteca, Bologna)
- Sacrifice of Isaac (Louvre, Paris)
- Orpheus and Eurydice (1697)
- Frescoes (1695, San Bartolomeo, Bologna)
- Martyrdom of Saint Catherine (Santa Caterina di Saragozza, Bologna)
- Immaculate Virgin with Saints Petronius & Dionysius the Areopagite (1684, Chiesa Parrocchiale, Monghidoro)
- Adoration of the Magi (Fogg Art Museum, Cambridge, Massachusetts)
- Bacchus and Ariadne (Private Collection)
- Herminia and the Shepherds (Pinacoteca, Bologna)
- Infant Jesus, Saint Joseph, and three saints (Louvre)
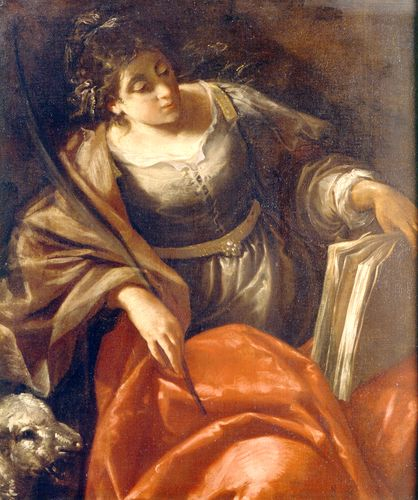
St. Agnese, Pinacoteca Nazionale di Bologna

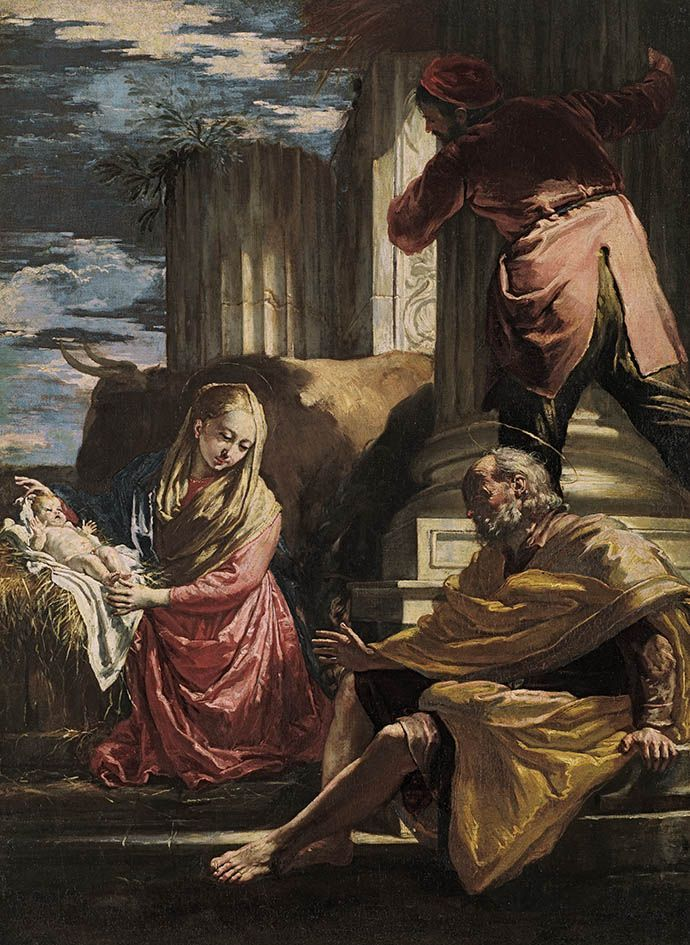
Birth of Jesus, Bavarian State Painting Collections

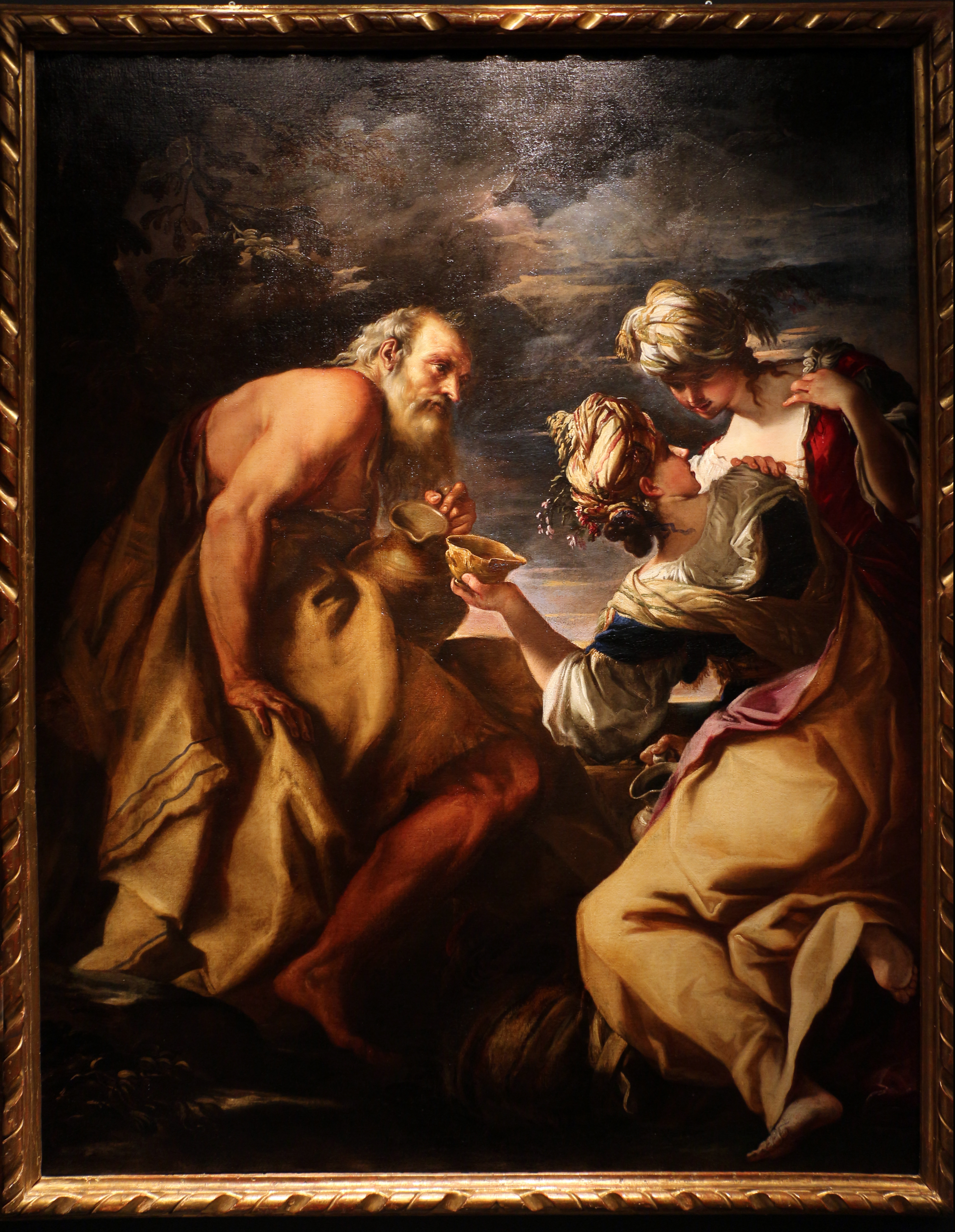
Lot and His Daughters, priv. col.

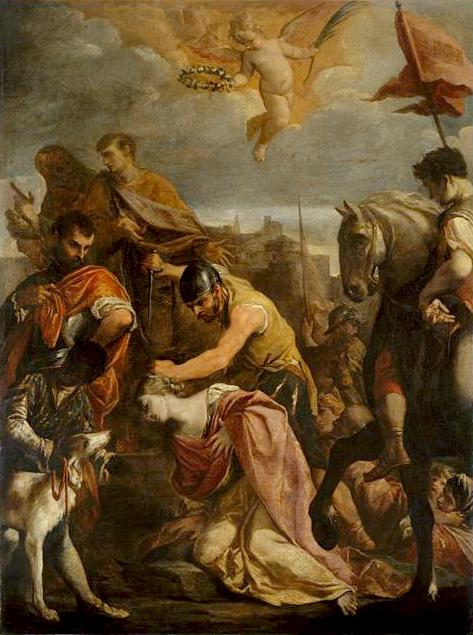
The Martyrdom of St. Victoire, priv. col.

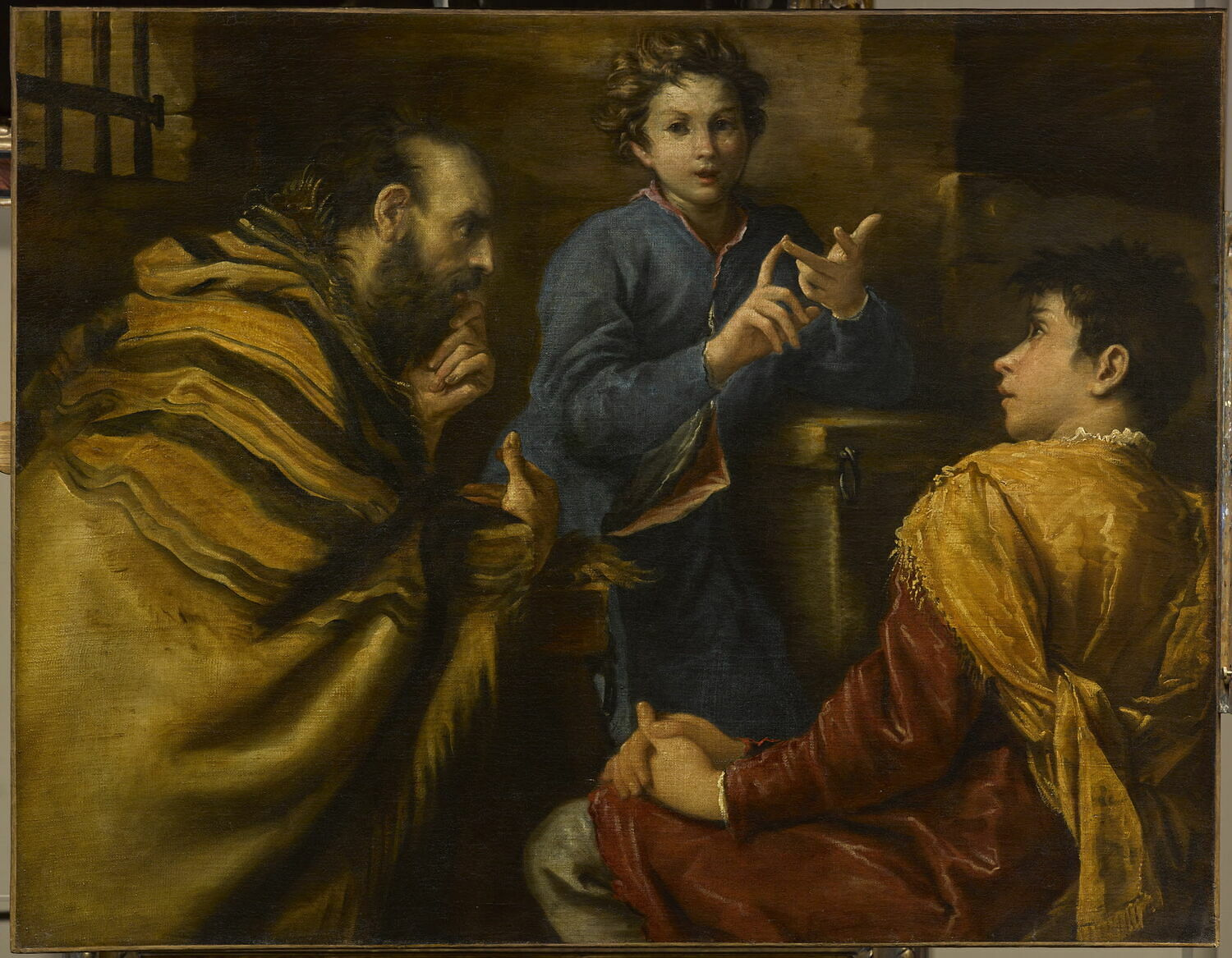
Joseph Interprets Pharaoh's Dreams, Louvre, Paris

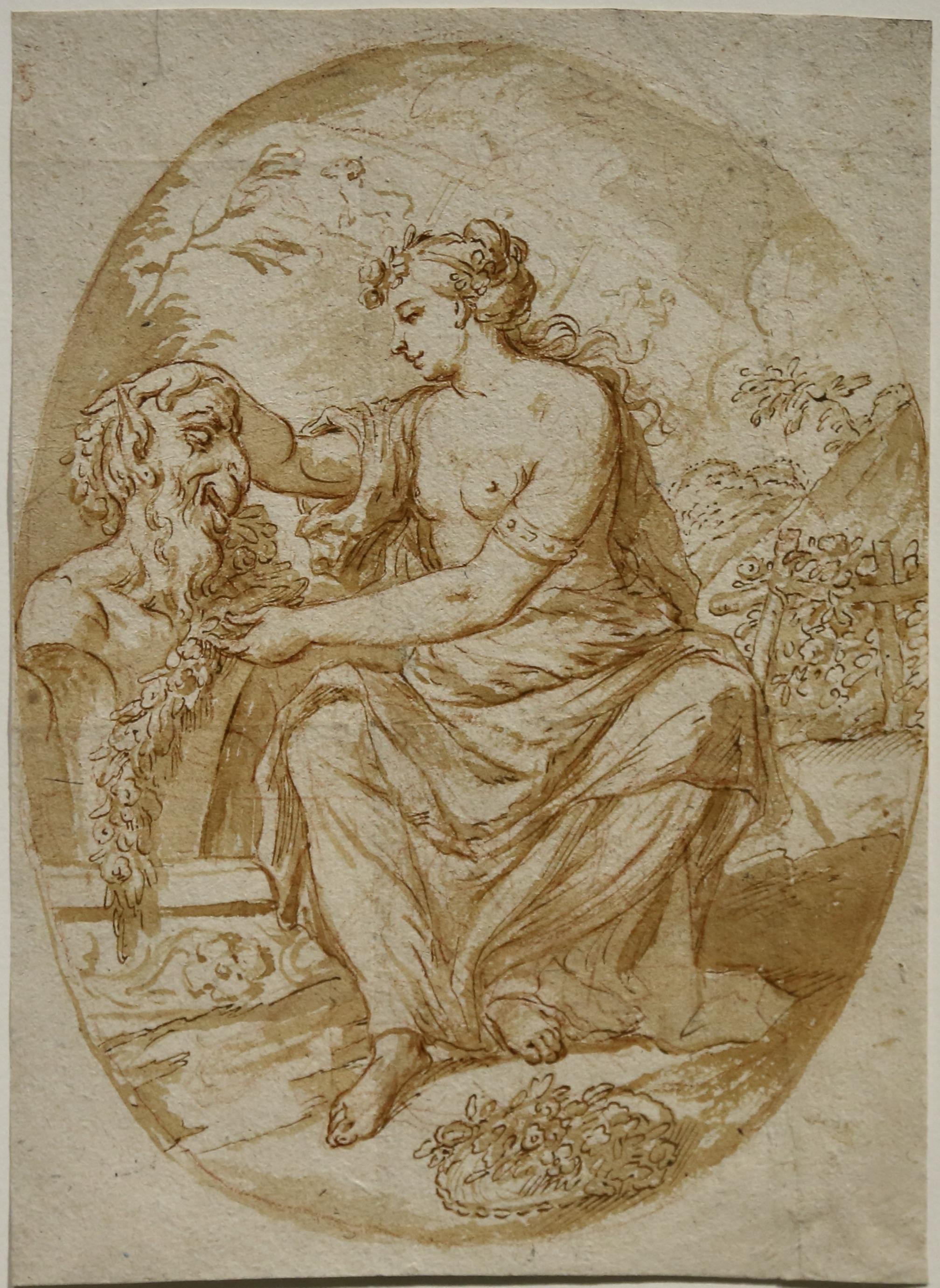
Woman sitting next to a bust of a Satyr, priv. col.

== Bibliography ==
- Francis P. Smyth; John P. O'Neill, eds. (1986). The Age of Correggio and the Carracci: Emilian Painting of the 16th and 17th Centuries. National Gallery of Art, Washington, D.C. pp. 385–391.
