= Gioseffo Maria Bartolini =

Italian painter (1657–1725)

Bartolini, Gioseffo Maria (1657–1725) was an Italian painter of the late-Baroque period.

He was born at Imola. He painted a Miracle of St. Biagio and other works for the church of San Domenico and in other churches. He opened a school at Imola, and painted throughout Emilia-Romagna. He painted in the style of his first teacher, Lorenzo Pasinelli.
