= San Barnaba, Modena =

Church building in Modena, Italy

Coordinates: 44°38′44.3″N 10°55′19.5″E

San Barnaba is a Baroque architecture, Roman Catholic parish church in Modena, Italy.

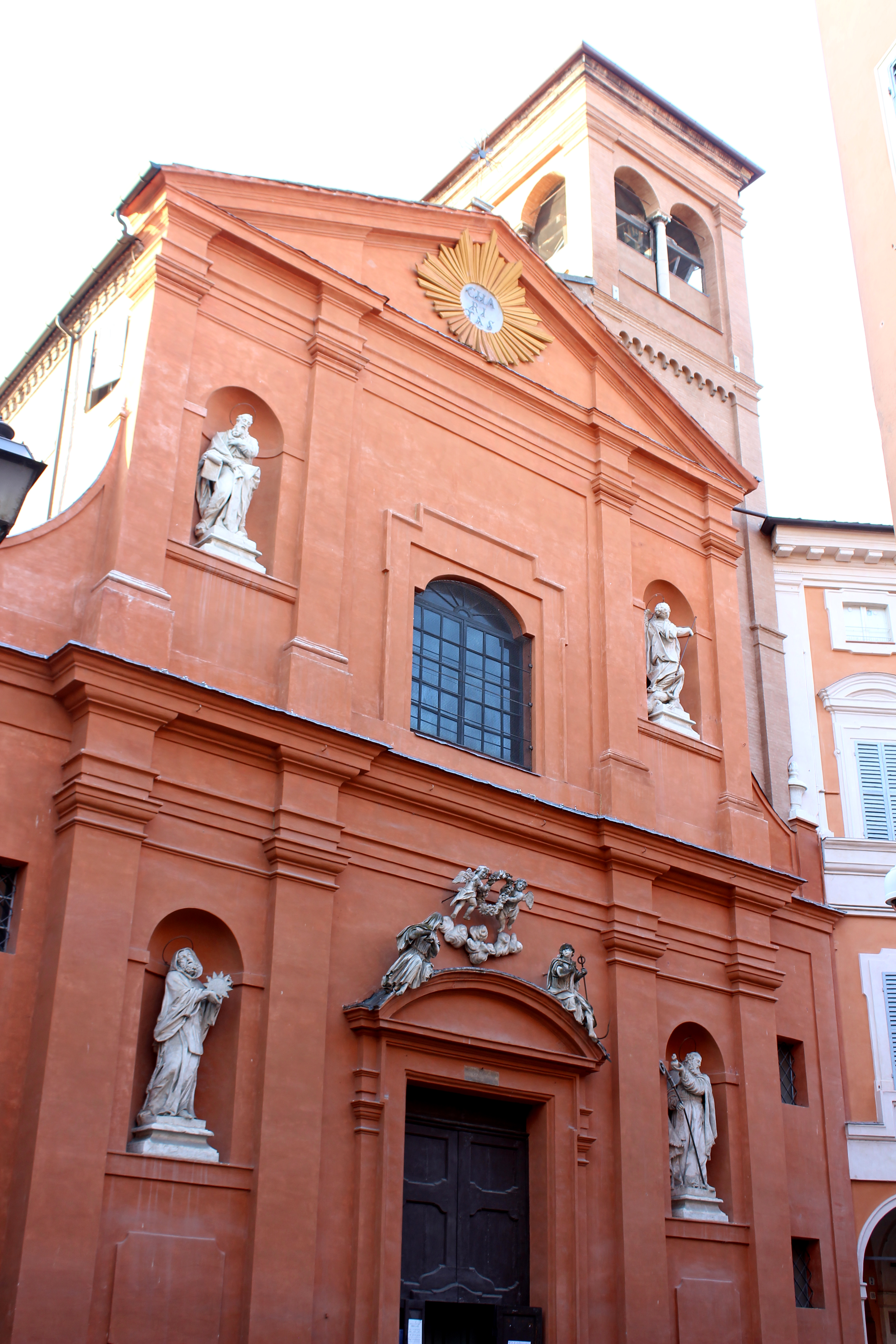
The facade of the church

Construction of the present church began in 1660, on the site of a former church from the 10th century. It underwent restoration in 1838. The ceiling has framed paintings by Sigismondo Caula and Jacopo Antonio Manini.
