= Andrea Monticelli =

Italian painter (1640–1716)

Andrea Monticelli (1640–1716) was an Italian painter of the Baroque period. He was also known as the Pittore da San Damiano for living and having his studio next to this church in Bologna.

== Biography ==
He was born in Bologna and learned to paint quadratura from Agostino Metelli and Matteo Borbone. He gained fame for painting still life and landscapes. He traveled through France, Savoy, and Florence. His brother Giacomo and son Teodoro were also painters. Giacomo Antonio Mannini was one of his pupils.
