= Francesco Pavona =

Italian painter (c. 1695 – c. 1777)

Francesco Pavona (c. 1695, Udine – c. 1777, Venice) was an Italian painter of the Baroque period. He was peripatetic, and became best known throughout Europe for pastel portraits, similar in style to Rosalba Carriera.

Pavona first studied in Udine with the pastel painter Carneo, then moved to Bologna to work with Giovanni Gioseffo dal Sole, and afterwards studied at Milan, and thence proceeded to Genoa; next Spain, Portugal, and Germany. He married and kept a family at Dresden, where he painted for the court. He returned to Bologna, but left in the course of a few years for Venice, where he was one of the founding professors of the Accademia di Belle Arti of Venice. He died shortly afterwards.

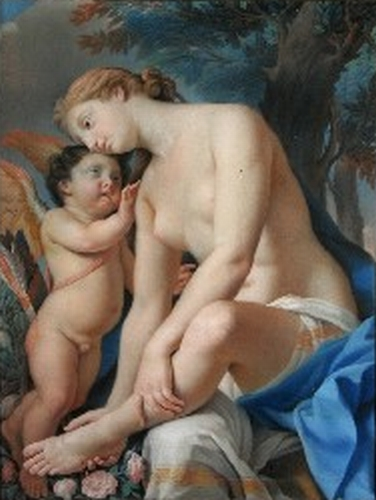
Cupid comforts the wounded Venus

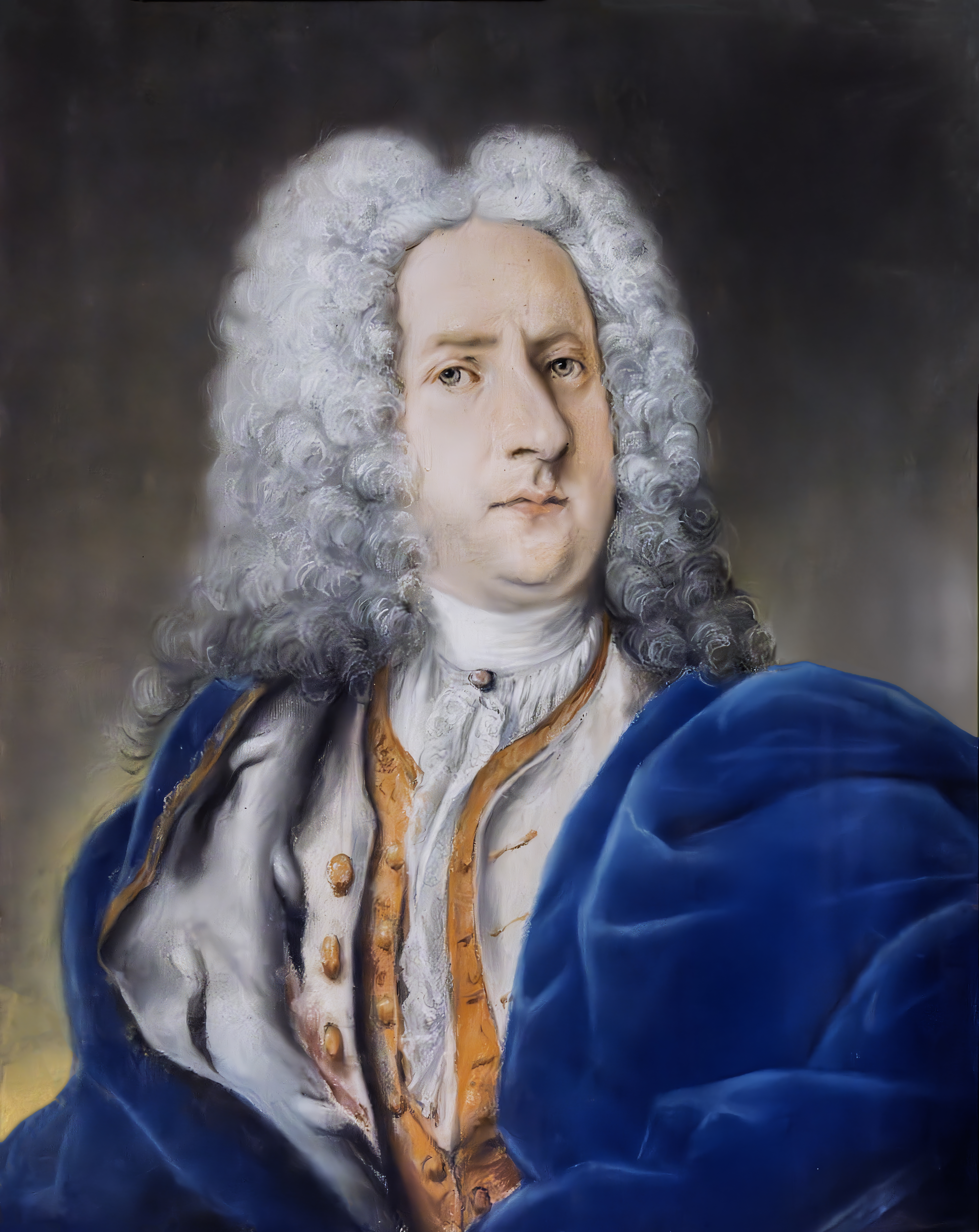
Portrait of Prosecutor Mocenigo - Pastel - Palazzo Mocenigo in Venice

== Sources ==
- Media related to Francesco Pavona at Wikimedia Commons
