= Jacopo Antonio Mannini =

Italian painter

Jacopo Antonio Mannini or Giacomo Antonio Manini (August 23, 1646 – February 10, 1752) was an Italian painter of the late Baroque period. He mainly painted quadratura.

He twas born in Bologna. He trained first with Andrea Monticelli, then with Domenico Santi. Along with the figure painter Sigismondo Caula, Mannini painted the ceiling frescoes (1702) of the church of San Barnaba in Modena. The work was restored in 1858. He also painted the ceiling of the Oratory of St Sebastian. He also painted, along with Marcantonio Chiarini, temporary decoration for festivities sponsored by the court of the Duke of Modena. His brother Angelo Michele helped him complete the decoration of San Bartolomeo in Modena.
