= Gioseffo Vitali =

Italian painter

Gioseffo Vitali (active 1700) was an Italian painter of the late-Baroque period. He was born in Bologna. He trained under Giovanni Gioseffo dal Sole. In Bologna, he painted an Annunciation for the church of Sant' Antonio; a S. Petronio for SS. Sebastiano e Rocco; and a Martyrdom of St. Cecilia in the church of that saint.
