= Anne Comi =

American pediatric neurologist

- Other name: Anne Marie Spalding Comi
- Education: College of the Holy Cross (BA); University of Buffalo (MD)
- Scientific career
- Fields: Pediatric neurology, Sturge–Weber syndrome, vascular malformation
- Workplaces: Johns Hopkins School of Medicine; Kennedy Krieger Institute

Anne Marie Spalding Comi is an American pediatric neurologist specializing in the treatment of Sturge–Weber syndrome. She is a professor of neurology and pediatrics at the Johns Hopkins School of Medicine and director of the Hunter Nelson Sturge-Weber Center at the Kennedy Krieger Institute.

== Life ==
Comi graduated from the College of the Holy Cross with a Bachelor of Arts, summa cum laude, in biology in 1989 with membership in Phi Beta Kappa. She then earned her Doctor of Medicine (M.D.) with highest honors from the University of Buffalo School of Medicine in 1993. She completed a residency in neurology at the Women & Children's Hospital of Buffalo in 1996 and the Johns Hopkins School of Medicine in 1999. She specializes in the treatment of Sturge–Weber syndrome and disorders due to vascular malformation.

Comi has served as the director of the Hunter Nelson Sturge-Weber Center at the Kennedy Krieger Institute since 2002. She is a professor of neurology and pediatrics at the Johns Hopkins School of Medicine.

In 2013, Comi and her research team identified a somatic mutation on the GNAQ gene as the cause of Sturge-Weber Syndrome, a discovery that significantly advanced the understanding of the disease and potential treatments.
