= Francesco Comi =

Italian painter

Francesco Comi, also known as il Muto da Verona or il Fornaretto (1682 – 1 January 1769), was an Italian painter of the Baroque Period. Born in Balogna, he was a pupil of Giovanni Gioseffo dal Sole. He was deaf and was active mainly in Verona, Republic of Venice.
