= Dionigi Donnini =

Italian painter

Dionigi Donnini (8 April 1681 – 1743) was an Italian painter, who was active at Modena.

Born into a noble family in Correggio, he began as a pupil of Francesco Stringa. He then moved to Bologna where he worked under Carlo Cignani, then became a pupil under Giovanni Giuseppe dal Sole. He was also active in Forlì, Pescia, Turin, Rimini, Bergamo, Faenza and Tivoli. He painted with Gasparo Bazzani a great hall in the Palazzo Milano a fresco commemorating the marriage of Ferdinand of Austria and Maria Beatrice.
