= Cesare Mazzoni =

Italian painter (1678–1763)

Cesare Giuseppe Mazzoni or Gioseffo Mazzoni (15 April 1678, in Bologna – 8 February 1763) was an Italian painter, active in a late-Baroque style.

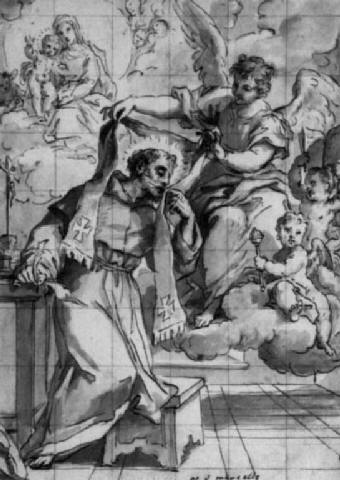
St Marcellus receives the stigmata.

== Biography ==
He was tall, and born with a cleft lip. His father was described as a rigattiere (or ragpicker) by Crespi, but as a seller of used furniture by other sources. Cesare studied under Lorenzo Pasinelli and then under Giovanni Gioseffo dal Sole. In Bologna, he received encouragement from Felice Torelli.

He worked the marchese Spada in Montiano, along with Gaetano Bertuzzi. He also painted the main altarpiece depicting San Colombano, for the Oratory of the Madonna of San Colombano in Bologna associated with the Church of the latter saint. He was soon to join the oratory.

He traveled to Turin for three years, where he painted for the Conte Galeano de Barbaresco. Returning to Bologna, he painted for the Senator Calderini and the Principe Ercolani. He became a member of the Clementine Academy of Fine Arts.

He worked in Vinegia, Faenza, in the Palazzo Leonida Spada near Ravenna, and Rome. He was never highly successful in gaining major commissions. His last work was a St Peter in Chains for the church of San Giovanni in Monte. He died of an illness with jaundice and was buried in the church of San Colombano, Bologna.
