= Lorenzo Pasinelli =

Italian painter (1629–1700)

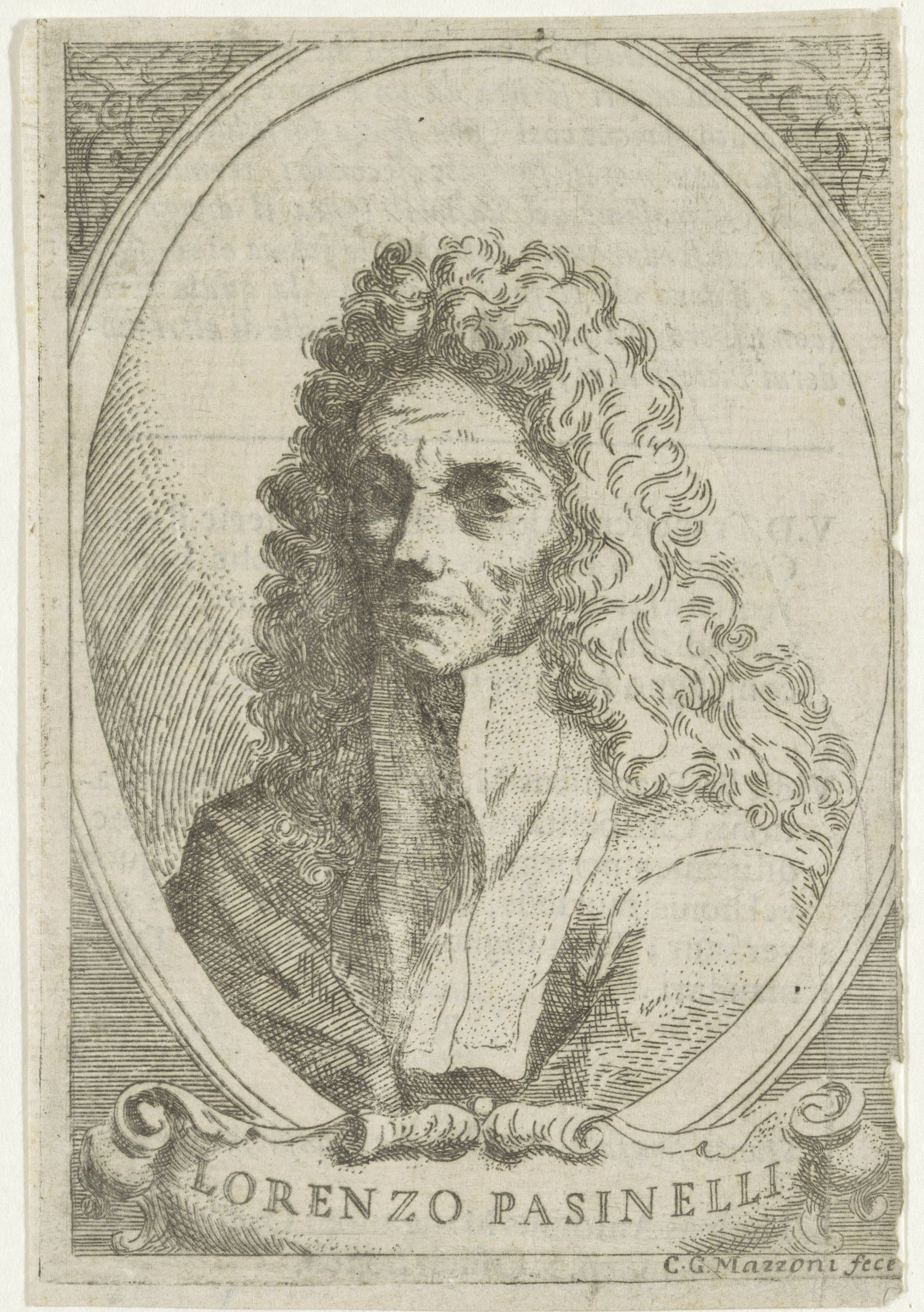
- Engraved portrait of Pasinelli by Cesare Giuseppe Mazzoni
- Born: 4 September 1629; Bologna, Papal States
- Died: 4 March 1700; Bologna, Papal States
- Known for: Painting
- Movement: Baroque

Lorenzo Pasinelli (September 4, 1629 – March 4, 1700) was an Italian painter active mainly in Bologna during the late Baroque period.

== Biography ==
=== Early career ===
Lorenzo Pasinelli was born in Bologna, and initially trained in the studio of Simone Cantarini. He then pursued studies in Rome. Despite that training, his works have an air of Mannerism. Pasinelli established his reputation as an independent master with a Samson and Delilah, commissioned by Senator Caldrini as a companion piece for a picture by Giovanni Andrea Sirani. Both Sirani and his daughter, Elisabetta Sirani, praised the picture. Important public commissions followed, among them an Entry of Christ into Jerusalem and a signed and dated Christ Appearing to the Virgin after his Resurrection (1657) for San Girolamo della Certosa, Bologna. These scenes are thronged with ponderous and richly vested figures, and this, together with the unusual richness of colouring, suggested to his public the art of Paolo Veronese.

Around 1660, in collaboration with the quadratura specialist Andrea Seghizzi, he painted two scenes from the lives of Urban VIII and Gregory XV in the Sala Farnese of the Palazzo d'Accursio. In 1661 he was called to Mantua to execute decorations in the Gonzaga residence at Mamirolo and in 1663 returned from decorating rooms in the royal residence at Turin, again with Seghizzi. Nothing has survived of these enterprises. In 1663 he spent many months of study in Rome, where he stayed in the palace of his compatriot, Senator Campeggi. His only picture executed in Rome was a large group portrait of members of the Campeggi family.

=== Mature career ===
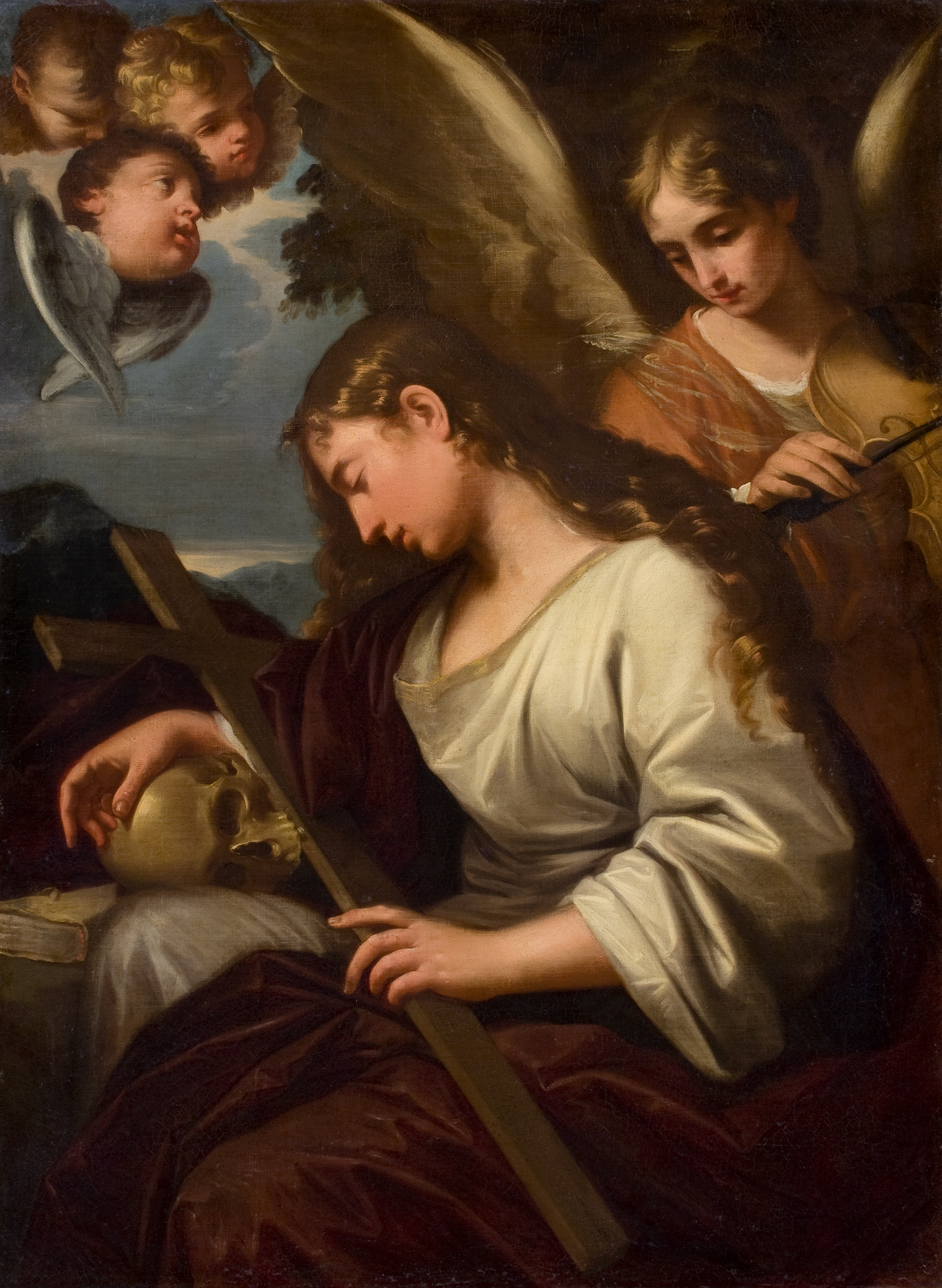
Penitent Magdalene, Museo Civico di Modena

On his return to Bologna he established himself, with Carlo Cignani, as the leading master in the city. He painted many history paintings for patrician collectors, not only in Bologna, but as far afield as central Europe and England. He chose affecting and dramatic subjects from the Old Testament and from ancient history. Among them are Susanna and the Elders, painted in Vienna for Karl Eusebius, Prince of Liechtenstein, Pompey’s Wife Swoons at the Sight of his Bloody Garments (1672–6) and an impressive Martyrdom of St. Ursula (before 1685; both Pinacoteca Nazionale di Bologna), painted for the Marchese Zambeccari. A St. John the Baptist Preaching was exhibited in the church of San Martino, Bologna, in 1686, before being sent to Germany. It aroused some criticism of the painter’s ‘excessive zeal’ in imitating Paolo Veronese (Zanotti).

His huge canvas of Mars Receiving Weapons from Jupiter and Athena, painted for the ceiling of the Viennese palace of Raimondo Montecuccoli, was his most ambitious work, and was engraved by his pupil Giovanni Gioseffo dal Sole. These pictures were perceived as events of some significance in the art life of the city, and local poets dedicated verses to them. His mythological subjects, executed with exceptional poetic warmth, include Diana’s Nymphs Clipping Wings of Cupid’s Amorini (London, priv. col.).

He also received commissions for altarpieces from Bologna and from elsewhere in Emilia, Romagna and the Marche. The huge Miracle of St. Anthony of Padua (1689; San Petronio, Bologna) and the Martyrdom of the Three Jesuit Missionaries in Japan, painted for Santa Lucia, the Jesuit church in Bologna, are especially noteworthy.

Pasinelli’s pupils included some of the most conspicuous artists in Bologna in the later years of the 17th and early 18th centuries; dal Sole, Giovanni Antonio Burrini, Aureliano Milani, Giuseppe Maria Mazza and Donato Creti. His biographer, Giampietro Zanotti, was also a favourite pupil; his writings present an unusually vivid picture of Pasinelli’s studio, and of the artist’s character and opinions.

== Legacy ==
In an overview of two major Bolognese painters circa 1700, one author describes that Pasinelli:

Lorenzo liked the design of Raphael joined with the charm of Paolo Veronese; while Carlo (Cignani) liked the grace of Correggio united to the erudition of Annibale (Carracci) ... while Pisanelli did not attain a fullness of correct design, which (Veronese) had advanced ... no one will fail to recognize in Pisanelli large picturesque fire and great new ideas, but sometimes is a tad forced in his movements, and using new and bizarre clothes.

== Gallery ==
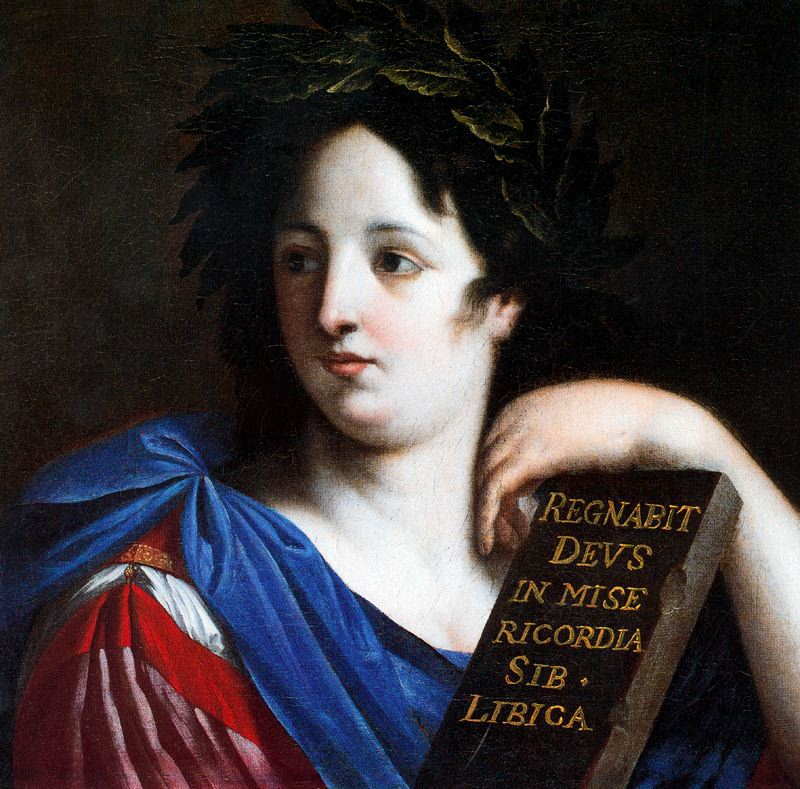
Libyan Sibyl

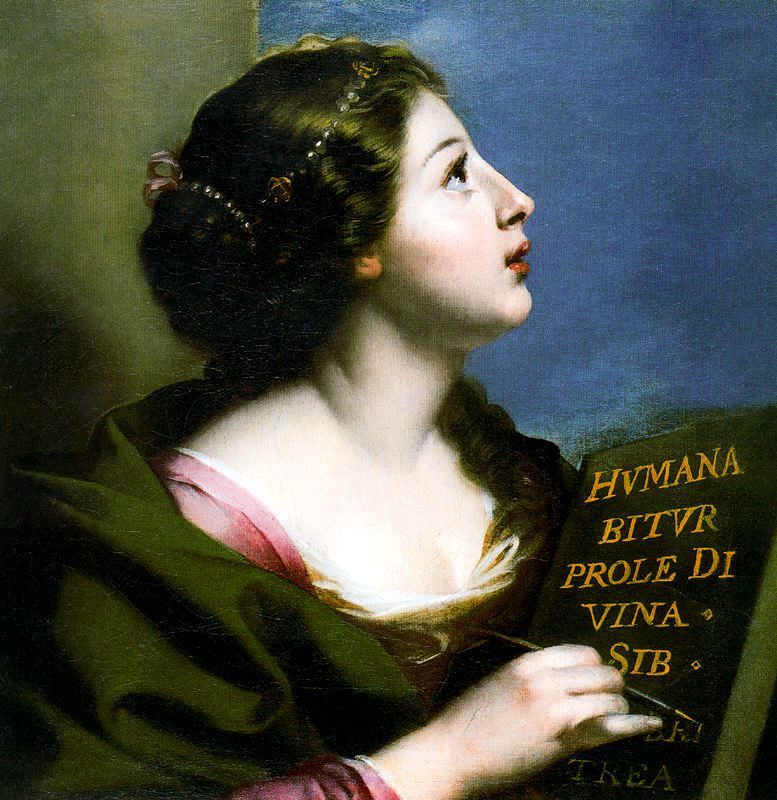
Erythraean Sibyl

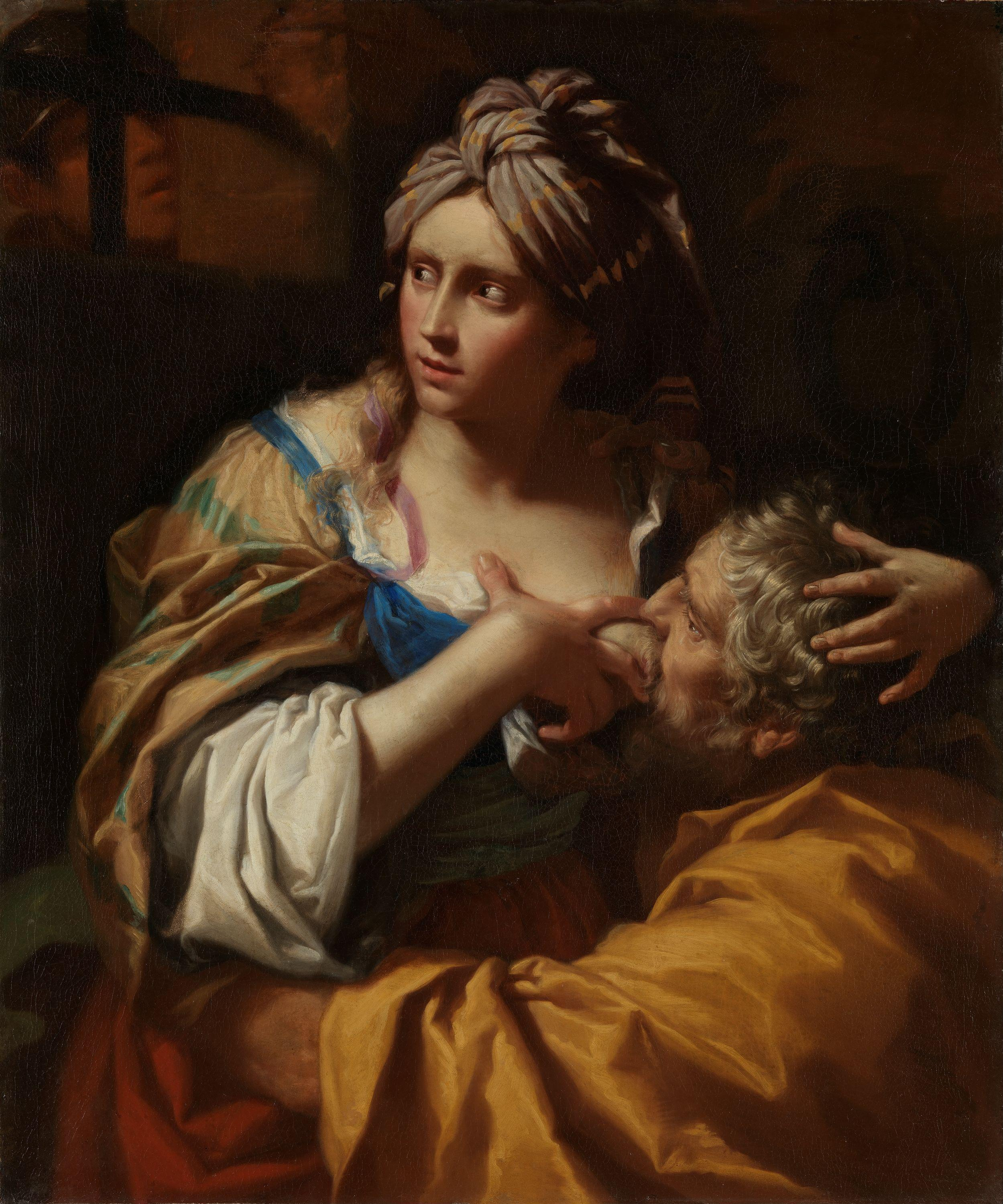
Roman Charity (ca. 1670)

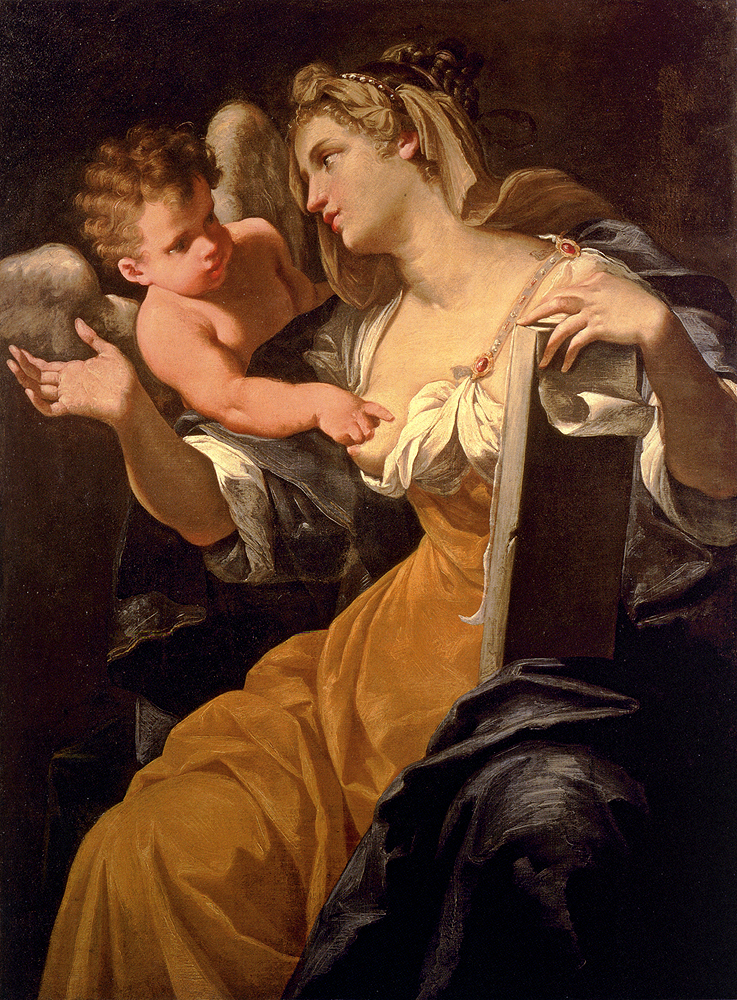
Sibyl inspired by Putto (Budrioli Family Sibyl)

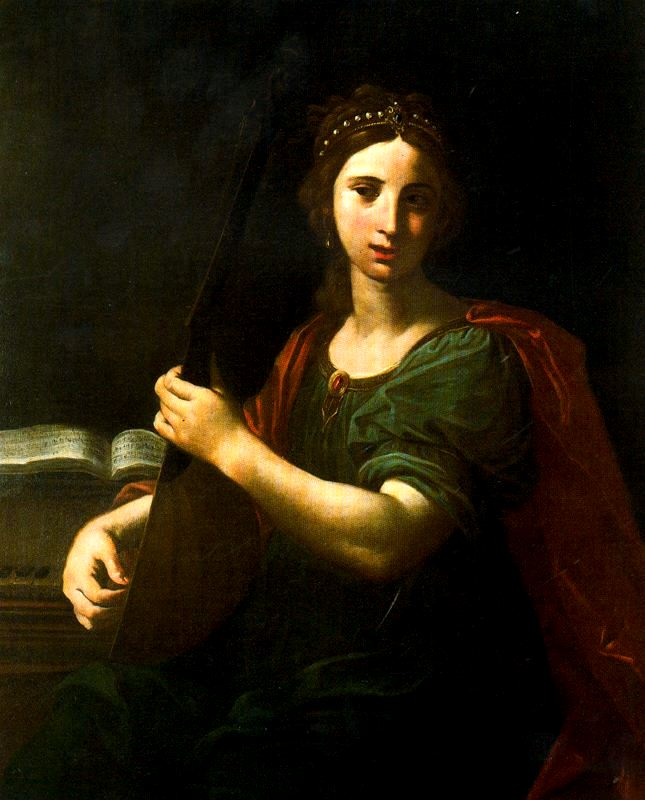
Lute Player

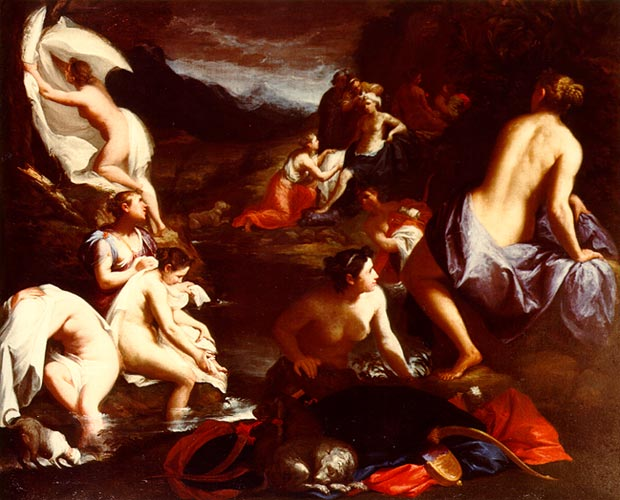
Diana and Nymphs

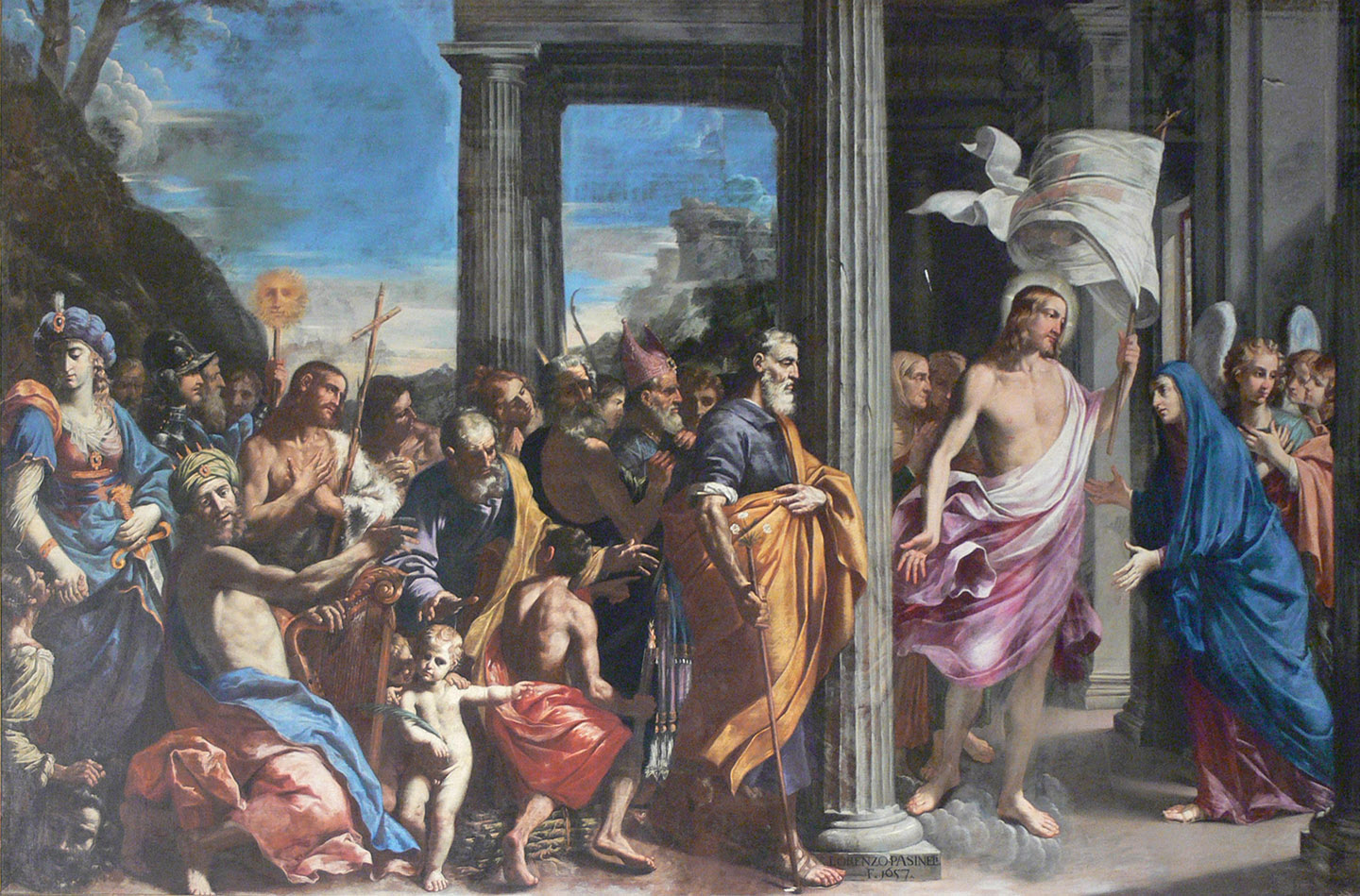
Resurrected Christ and Fathers of Church visit his Mother Mary

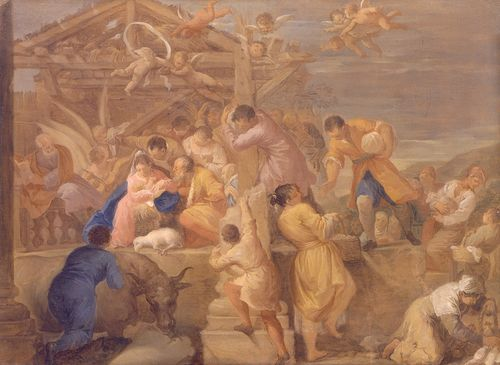
Adoration by Shepherds

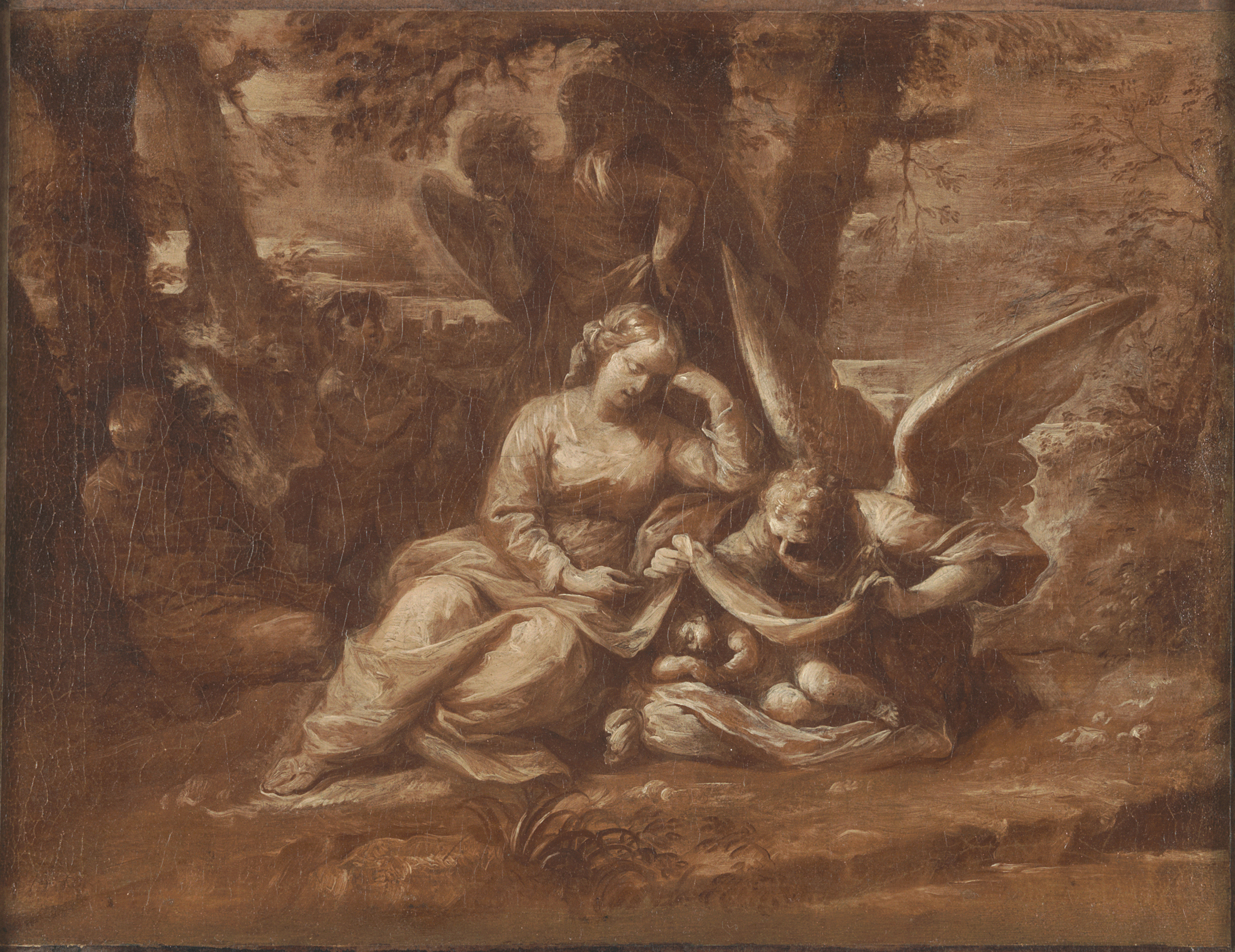
The Rest on the Flight into Egypt

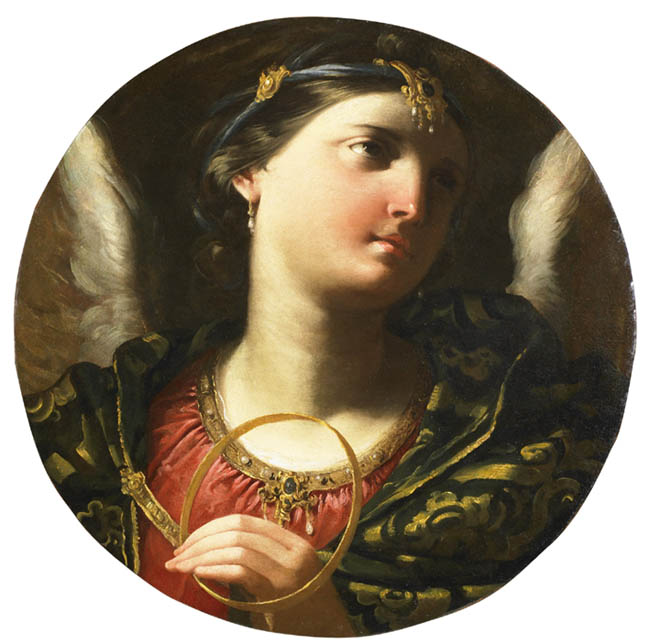
Allegory of Eternity

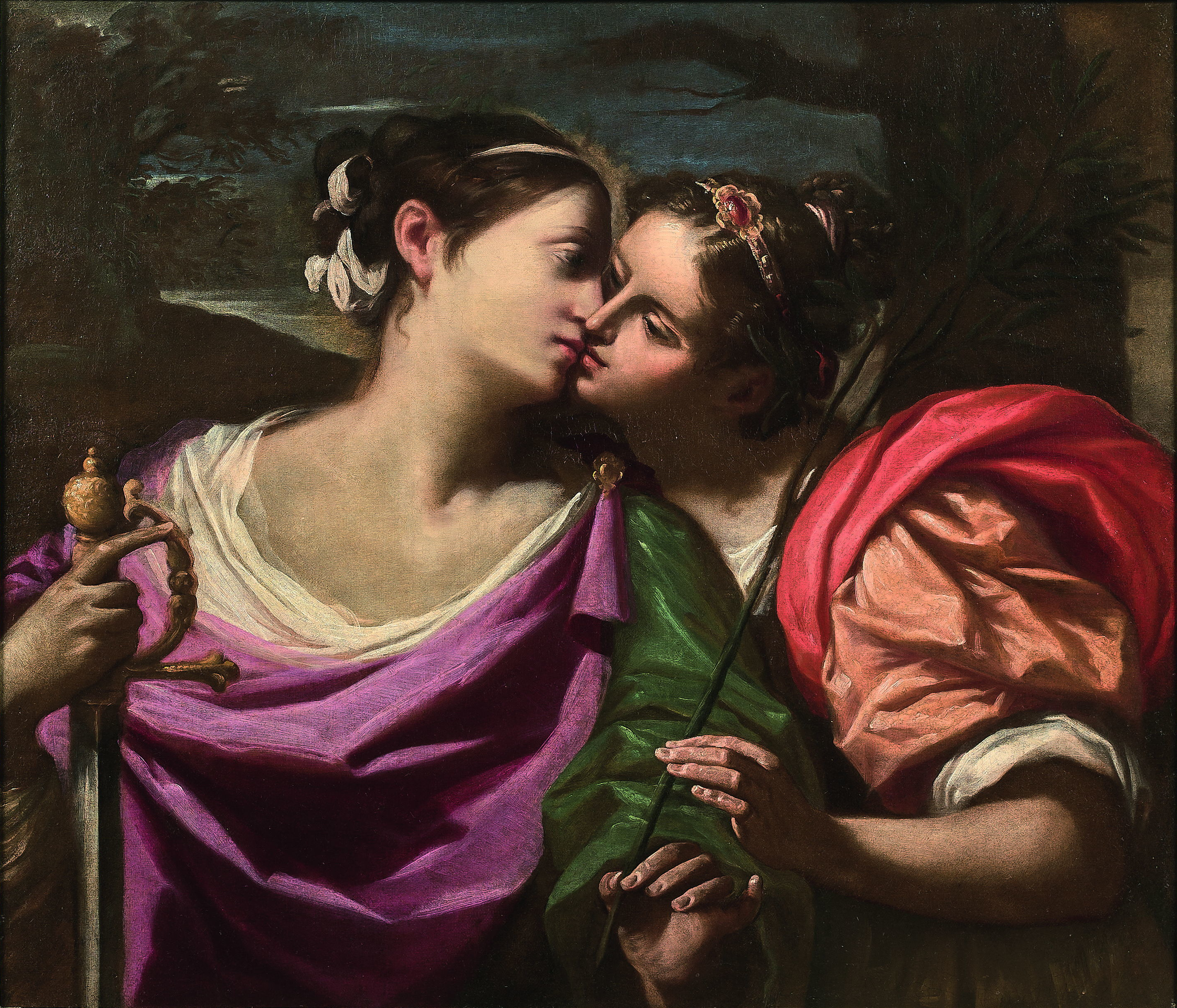
Allegory of Justice and Peace

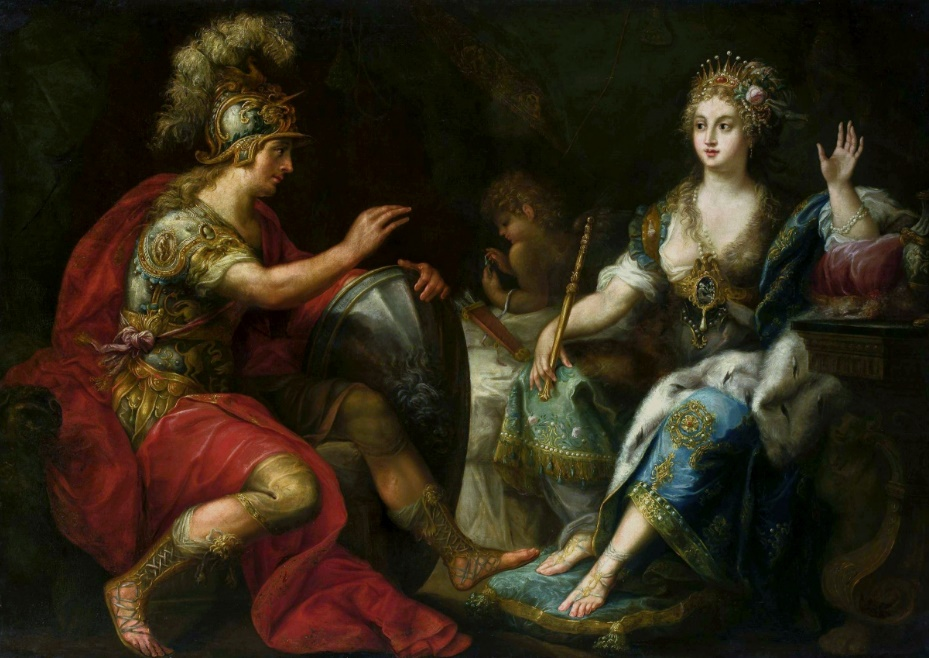
Aeneas and Dido

== Bibliography ==
- Wittkower, Rudolf (1993). Art and Architecture Italy, 1600-1750. Pelican History of Art. 1980. Penguin Books. p. 343.
- Farquhar, Maria (1855). Ralph Nicholson Wornum (ed.). Biographical catalogue of the principal Italian painters. London: Woodfall & Kinder. pp. 120–121.
