= Giovanni Gioseffo dal Sole =

Italian painter (1654–1719)

Giovan Gioseffo Dal Sole
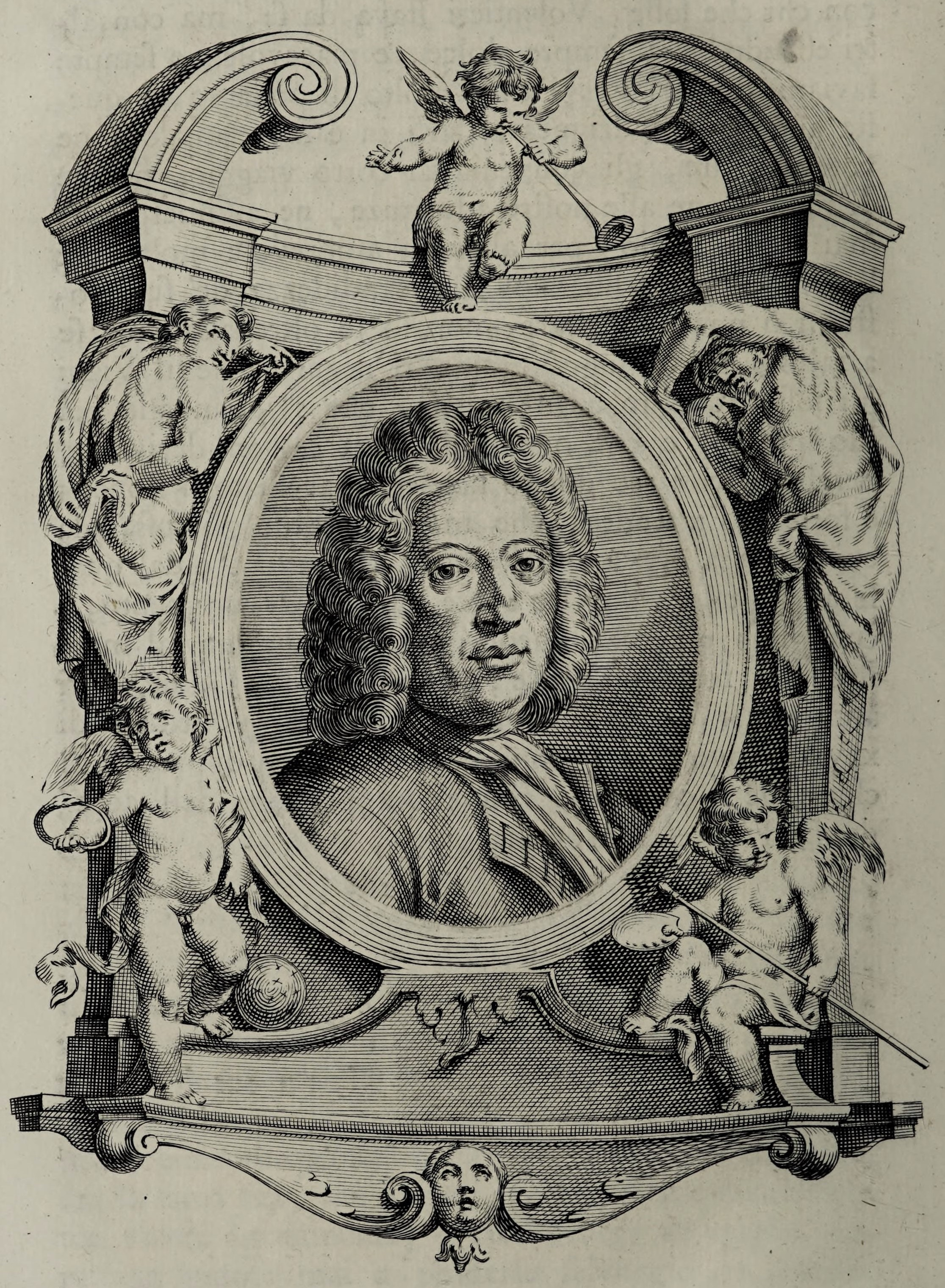
- Portrait of Giovan Gioseffo Dal Sole
- Born: 10 December 1654; Bologna, Romagna, Papal States (modern Bologna, Emilia-Romagna, Italy)
- Died: 22 July 1719 (aged 64); Bologna, Romagna, Papal States (modern Bologna, Emilia-Romagna, Italy)
- Education: Domenico Maria Canuti; Lorenzo Pasinelli
- Occupation: Painter
- Movement: Baroque

Giovanni Gioseffo dal Sole (10 December 1654 – 22 July 1719) was an Italian painter and engraver from Bologna, active in the late-Baroque period. Upon the death of Carlo Cignani, Gioseffo dal Sole became among the most prominent painters in Bologna, described as the Guido Moderno.

== Biography ==
=== Early life and education ===
His father, Giovanni Antonio Maria, also called Mochino de' Paesi due to his ambidextrous dexterity, was a landscape painter who trained with Francesco Albani. Giovanni Gioseffo first apprenticed with Domenico Maria Canuti, and then in 1672; he entered the Roman studio of Lorenzo Pasinelli. Pasinelli’s art united the traditions of Bolognese classicism with a tendency towards Venetian painterliness and rich colour, and through it dal Sole absorbed the work of Guido Reni and of Reni’s most gifted pupil, Simone Cantarini. Dal Sole soon became his master’s favourite and executed two fine engravings after Pasinelli’s compositions, the most important of which was the print he made of Mars Receiving Weapons from Jupiter, Juno and Athena, a ceiling painting made for Raimondo Montecuccoli’s palace in Vienna and now known only through the engraved version.

Through his friendship with Conte Alessandro Fava (recorded on a drawing by dal Sole of a Standing Peasant, 1672; New York, Metropolitan Museum of Art) dal Sole had the chance to study the frescoes by the Carracci in the Palazzo Fava. As a mature artist dal Sole’s predilection for the art of Reni and of Ludovico Carracci became more apparent.

=== Early career ===
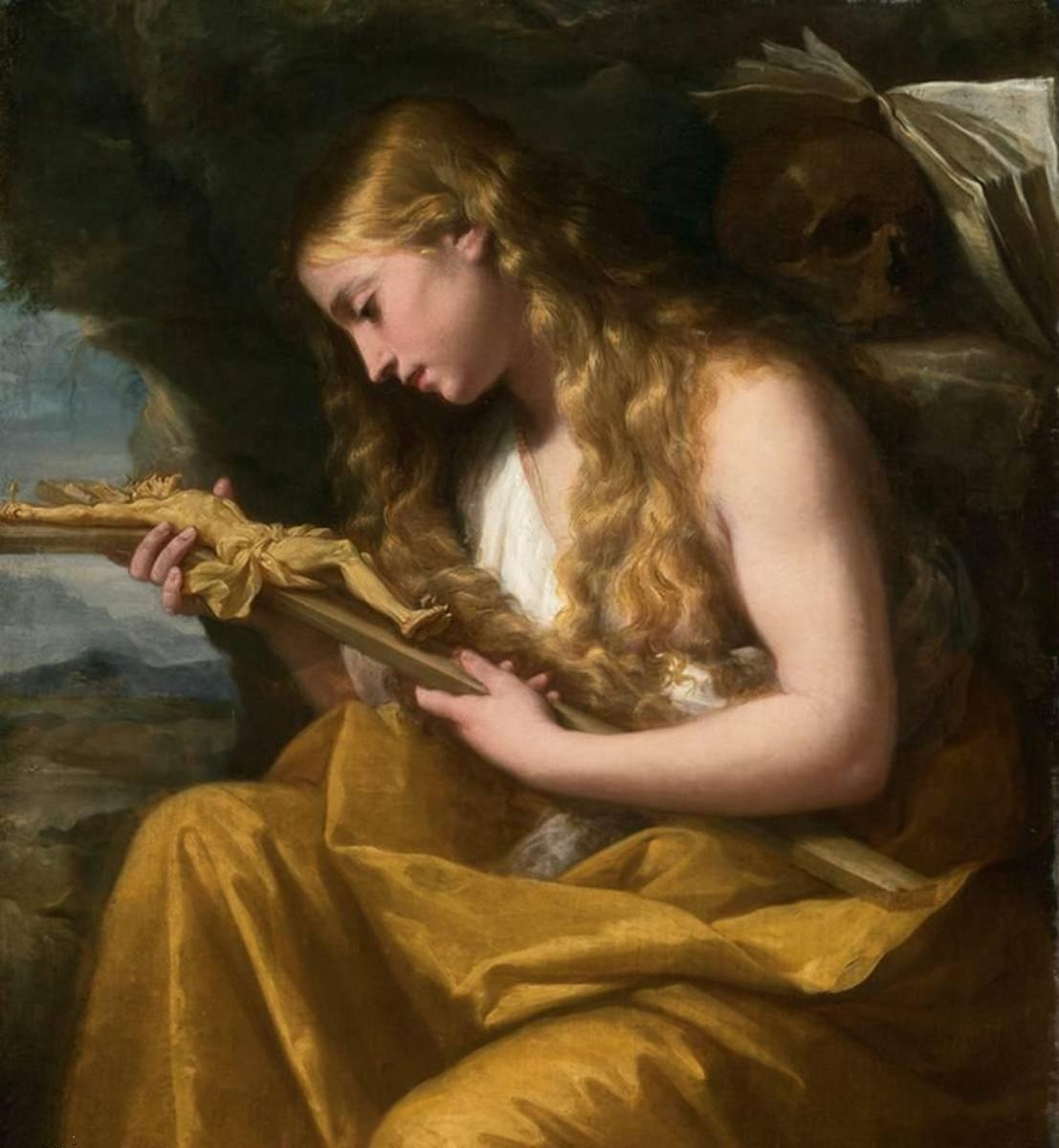
Mary Magdalen, priv. col.

After establishing himself as an independent master dal Sole undertook a series of large-scale fresco decorations that soon brought him fame. He worked with the most distinguished specialists in quadratura painting, and in 1686 decorated the bay before the high altar of San Biagio, Bologna, with Ercole Graziani il vecchio (1651–1726) and a ceiling in the Marchese Giandemaria’s palace in Parma with Tommaso Aldrovandini. His most impressive work, done in collaboration with the best of the Bolognese quadratura specialists, Marcantonio Chiarini, was in the Palazzo Mansi at Lucca, where they created elegant and refined ceiling paintings (c. 1686–8) – the Banquet of the Gods, the Judgement of Paris and the Burning of Troy – that reinterpreted the pastoral idylls of Francesco Albani.

In the vault of the Palazzo Bianconcini in Bologna, dal Sole painted the handsome Triumph of Bacchus and Ariadne, which is indebted in colour and tonality to Paolo Veronese. For a chapel in the church of Santa Maria dei Poveri in Bologna he created the brilliantly illusionistic cupola decoration, Heavenly Glory (finished 1692), for which he again collaborated with Aldrovandini and with the sculptor Giuseppe Mazza.

Dal Sole by no means confined his activity to fresco decoration, and on his return from Lucca to Bologna he began to paint, with considerable originality, large easel pictures of scenes from ancient history or taken from epic poetry – Virgil’s Aeneid and Tasso’s Jerusalem Delivered. In this period, for Senator Bovio, he painted Artemesia Drinking the Ashes of her Husband (version, Palazzo Corsini, Rome). His grand and elevated interpretation of a dramatic subject, the Death of Priam (New York, priv. col.), painted for the Marchese Durazzo of Genoa, which is described in careful detail by Zanotti, must have made a particularly strong impression. Zanotti declared that with this work, ‘veramente all’antica effigiato’, the artist moved to the forefront of serious history painters of his time.

=== Mature work ===
Dal Sole’s history paintings were chiefly responsible for the reputation that he began to enjoy beyond his native Emilia, where his name was already established. The range of his high-born clientele soon extended to central Europe, particularly to Vienna. For Johann Wilhelm, Elector Palatine, he painted the Rape of the Sabines (untraced; an engraving (1729) by Hamlet Winstanley records a painting then at Knowsley Hall, which was probably a second version of this subject); for Aeneas de Caprara, Rinaldo in the Arms of Armida; for Joseph Johann Adam, Prince of Liechtenstein, the Sacrifice of Jeptha; for the city palace of Prince Eugene of Savoy several pictures based on imposing ancient subjects, among them the pendants Dido Beholds the Spectre of Sichaeus in a Dream (1697; Vienna, Kunsthistorisches Museum) and Hercules and Omphale (1697; Dresden, Gemäldegalerie Alte Meister). According to Zanotti, dal Sole received but declined an invitation to become court artist to the King of Poland.

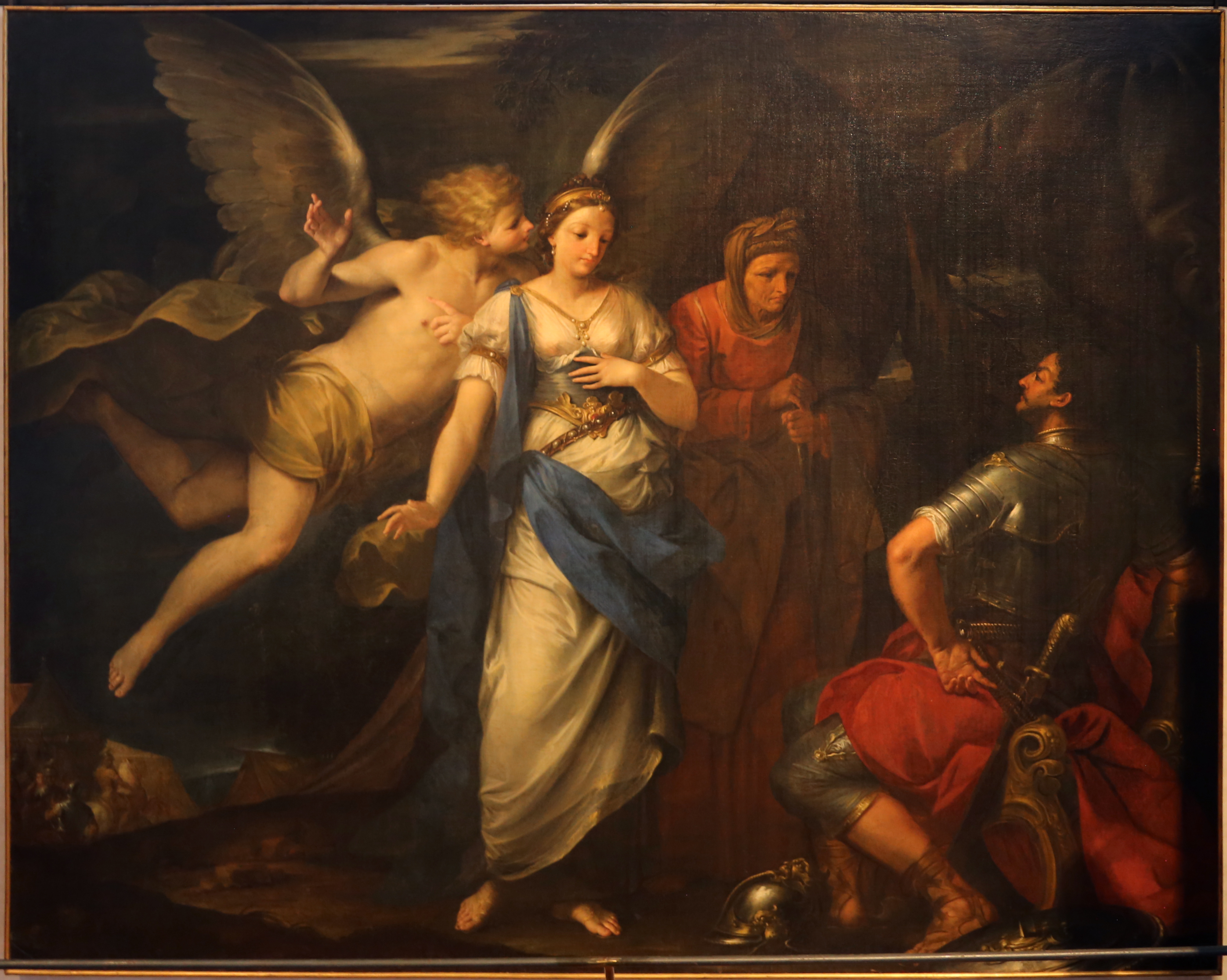
Judith before Holofernes Inspired to Act by an Angel, Padua, priv. col.

Among dal Sole’s distinguished Italian patrons, Conte Ercole Giusti of Verona was of particular importance. He was so impressed with the artist that he offered him the hospitality of his palace for an extended sojourn in that city. Dal Sole stayed in Verona for a brief period c. 1697 and painted several pictures for the Conte, among them Lucretia and Tarquinius, Venus Urging Bacchus to Take Ariadne as his Wife and Diana and Endymion. For a relative, Conte Gomberto Giusti, he painted a large, impressive work, showing an unusual episode from the book of Judith: Judith before Holofernes Inspired to Act by an Angel (Padua, priv. col.).

Zanotti recounts how Veronese painters who had criticized dal Sole’s slow manner of working were treated to a demonstration of bravura execution in the presence of Conte Ercole Giusti: the artist rapidly blocked out a large Bacchus and Ariadne and proceeded to finish the composition in a few days. Then he painted it out and re-created it in his preferred, more painstaking manner, thus putting an end to the petty criticism. He returned to the subject of Judith with Portrait of a Woman as Judith (Minneapolis Institute of Art), which may be the portrait of Conte Silvio Marsili’s wife that Zanotti cited as an example of dal Sole’s exceptional skill in portraiture.

Among the most notable works of dal Sole’s later period are the large Worship of the Trinity by Saints Cassian of Imola and Peter Chrysologus (1700; Imola, church of the Suffragio), one of his regular ecclesiastical commissions, and Andromache Weeping before Aeneas (1714; Macerata, Palazzo Buonaccorsi), which was commissioned by Raimondo Buonaccorsi and is one of the few securely dated late works. It is recorded that dal Sole went to Macerata expressly to see Francesco Solimena’s Dido and Aeneas (1714; Macerata, Palazzo Buonaccorsi), a work that had been painted for the same series.

In 1716 dal Sole visited Rome for purposes of study. His host, Cardinal Lorenzo Casoni, and Pope Clement XI both offered him generous hospitality. The only painting he appears to have done was a portrait of the Pope’s nephew. A subsequent study visit to Venice resulted in the last illness of a career that had been dogged by constant ill-health.

Among his many pupils were Felice Torelli, Lucia Casalini (Torelli's wife), Antonio Beduzzi, Francesco Monti, Bastiano Galleoti, Gioseffo Vitali, Donato Creti, Giovanni Battista Grati (Batistino Grati), of Bologna Cesare Mazzoni, Bernardino Norsini, Giacomo Pavia, Antonio Lunghi, Carlo Salis, Francesco Pavona, Dionigi Donnini (Girolamo Donini), Francesco Comi (il Fornaretto), and Jacopo Saeta. He also played some role as a mentor to a pupil of Pasinelli and Sirani (though unclear father or daughter Elisabetta), Teresa Muratori Scannabecchi, and his Giovanni Gioseffo's granddaughter Francesca Fantoni.

== Gallery ==
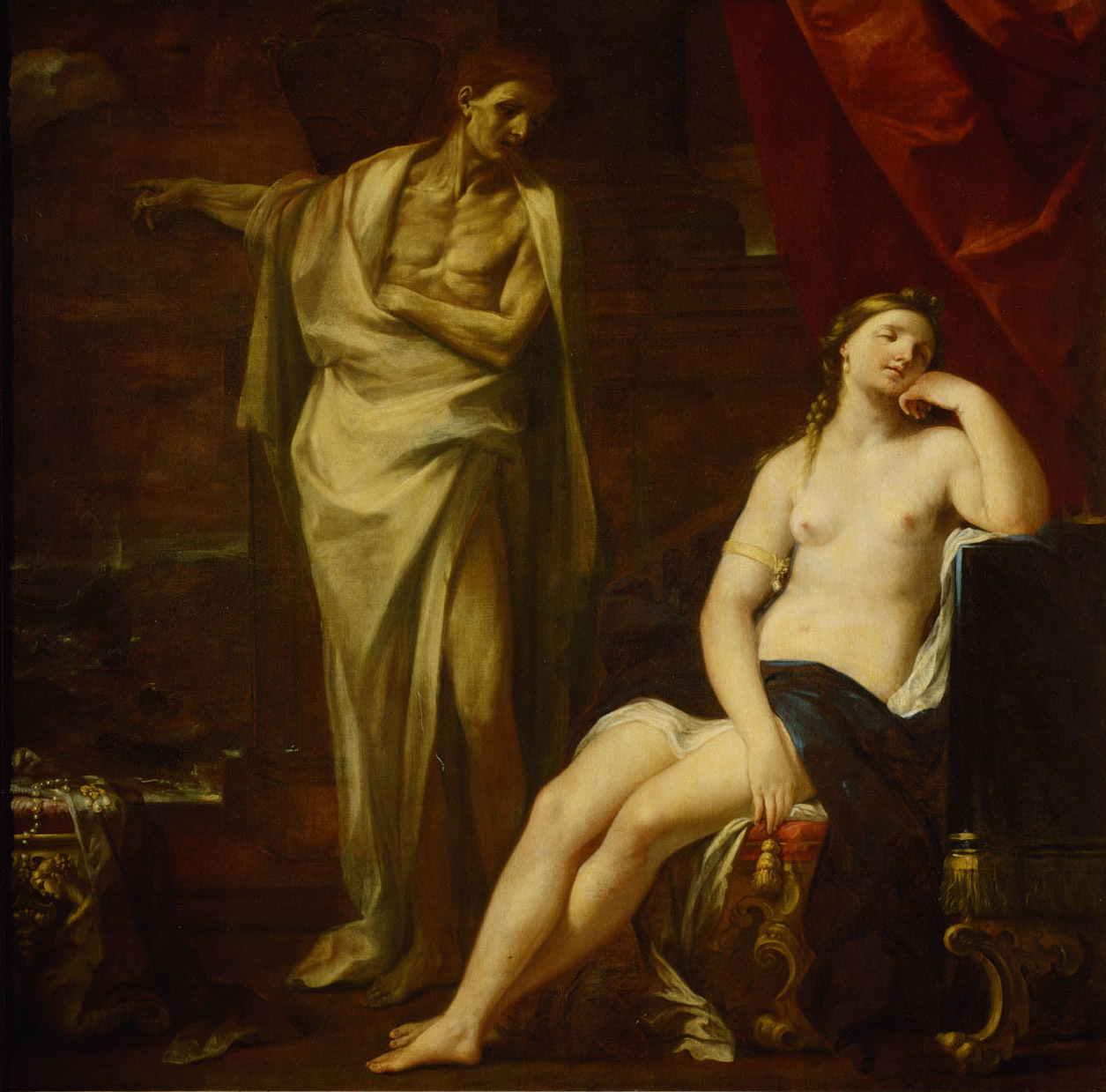
The dream of Dido

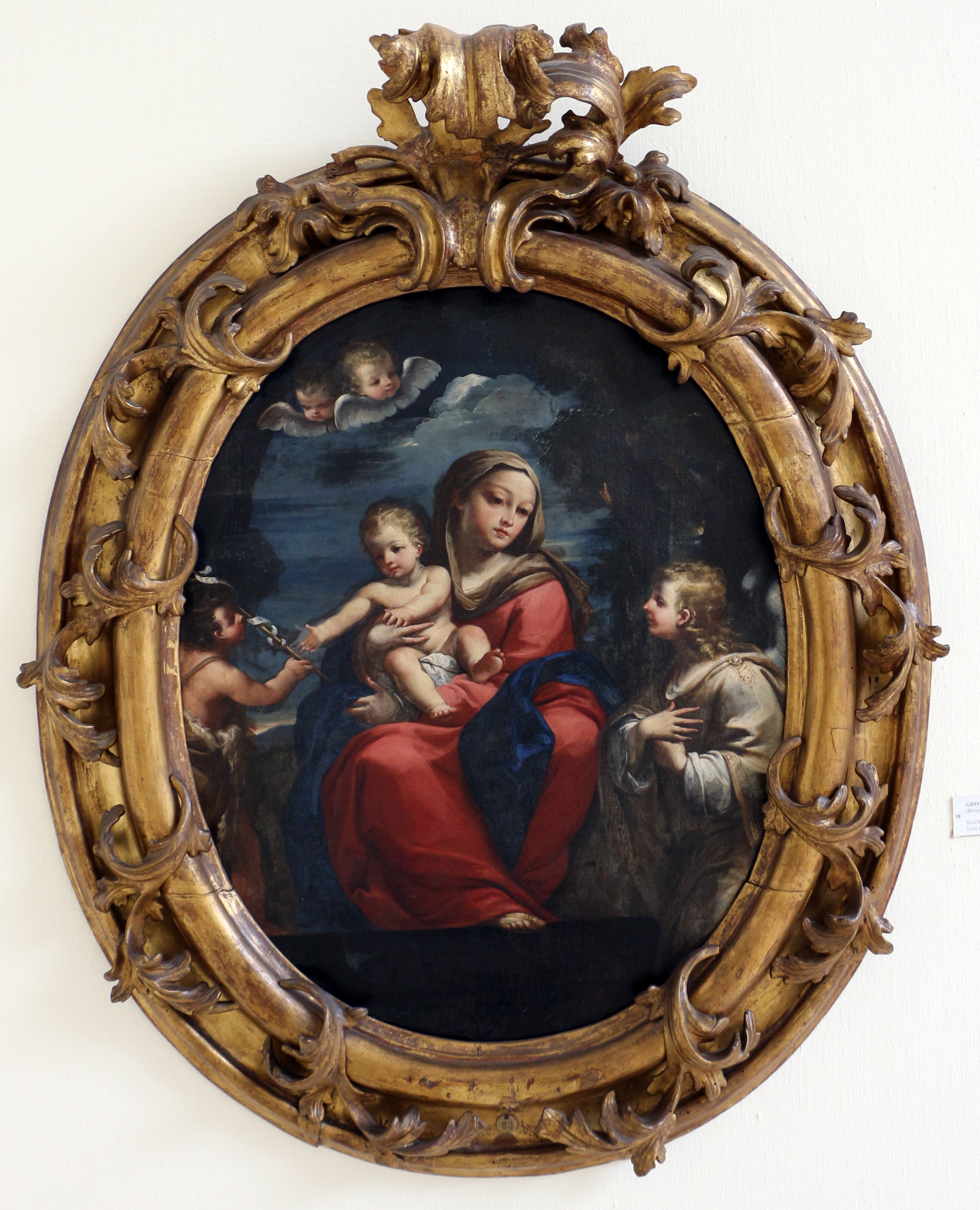
Madonna and Child with St. John and Angels

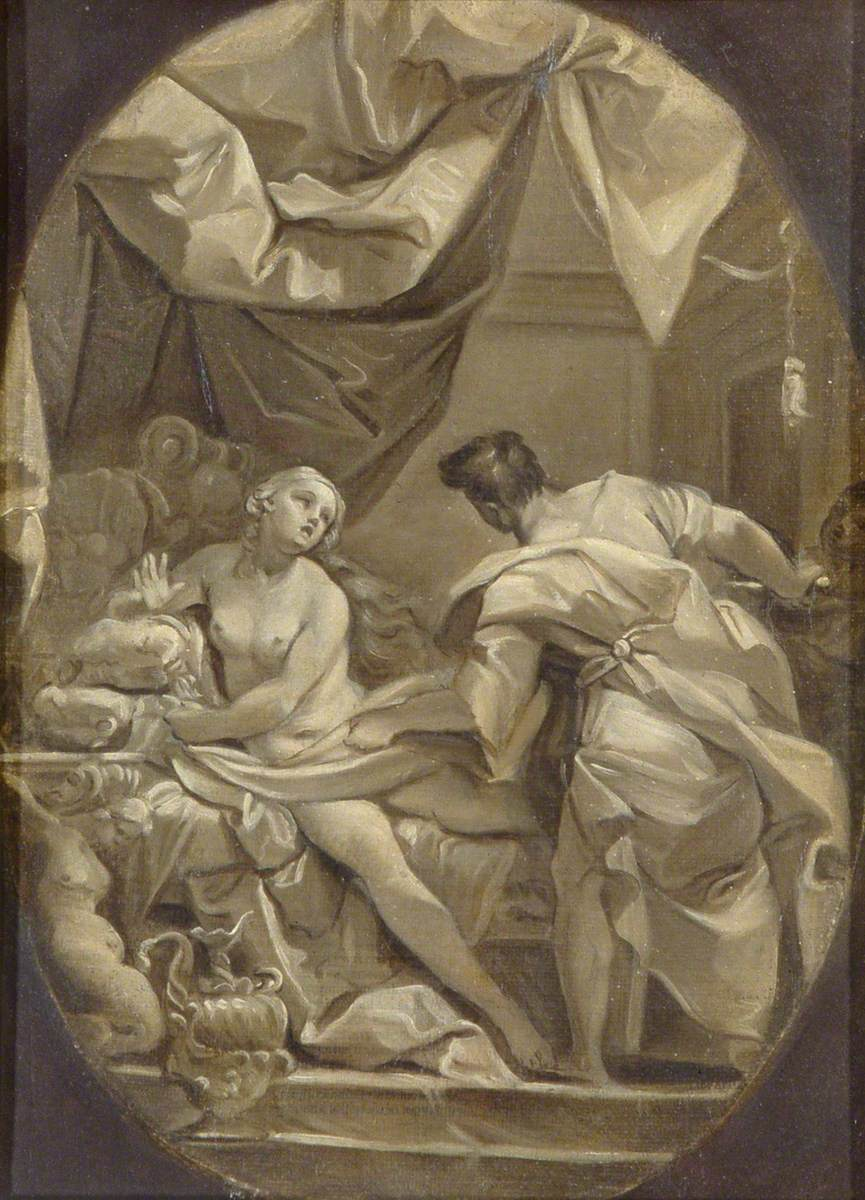
Rape of Lucretia

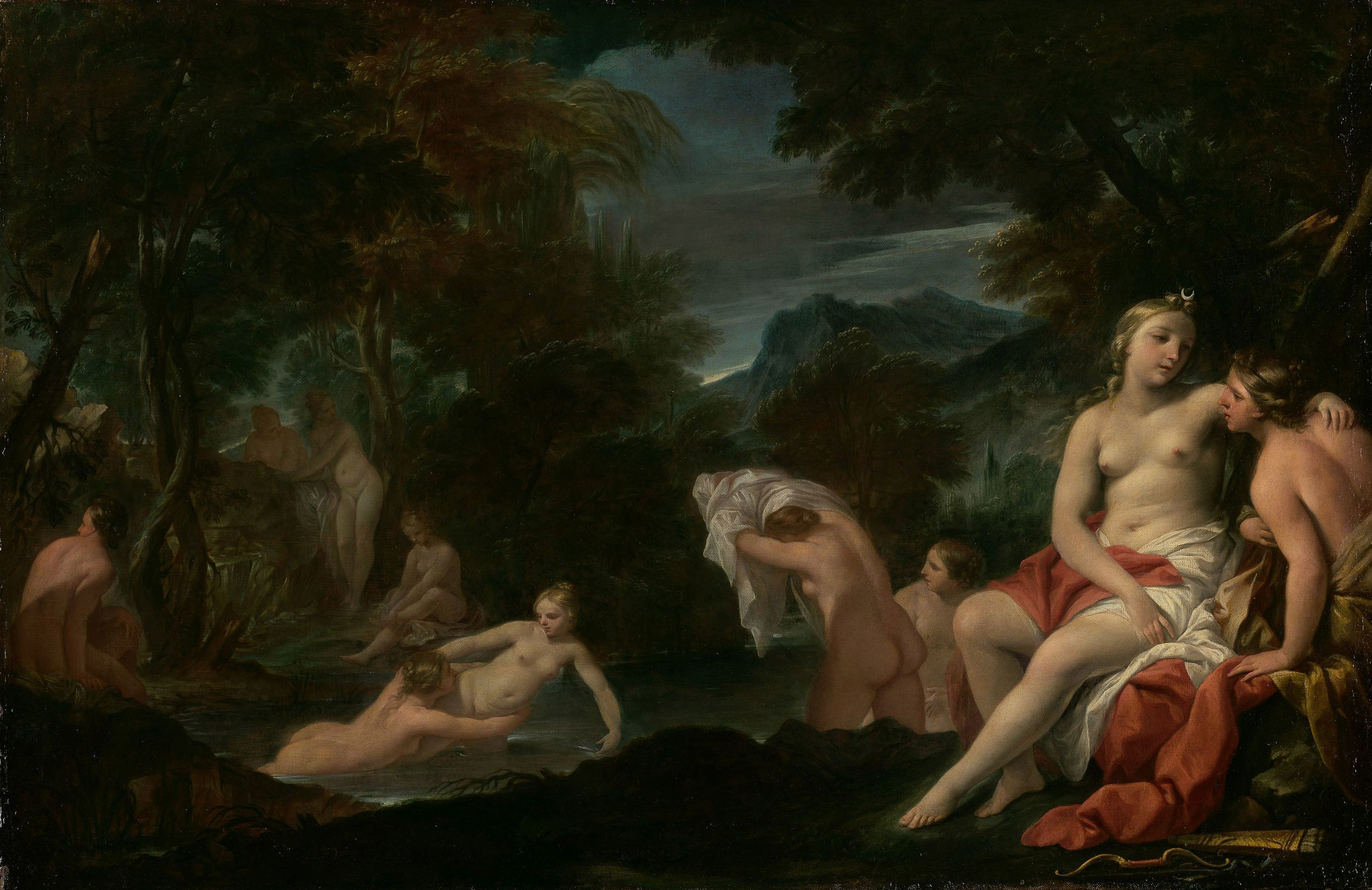
The bath of Diana

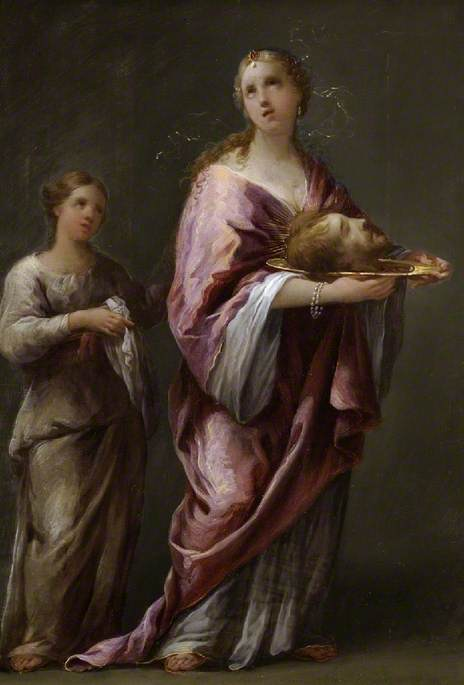
Salome with the Head of Saint John the Baptist

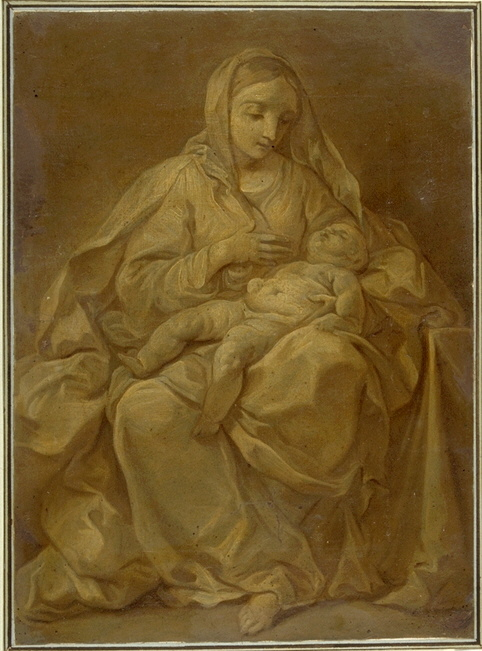
Madonna and Child

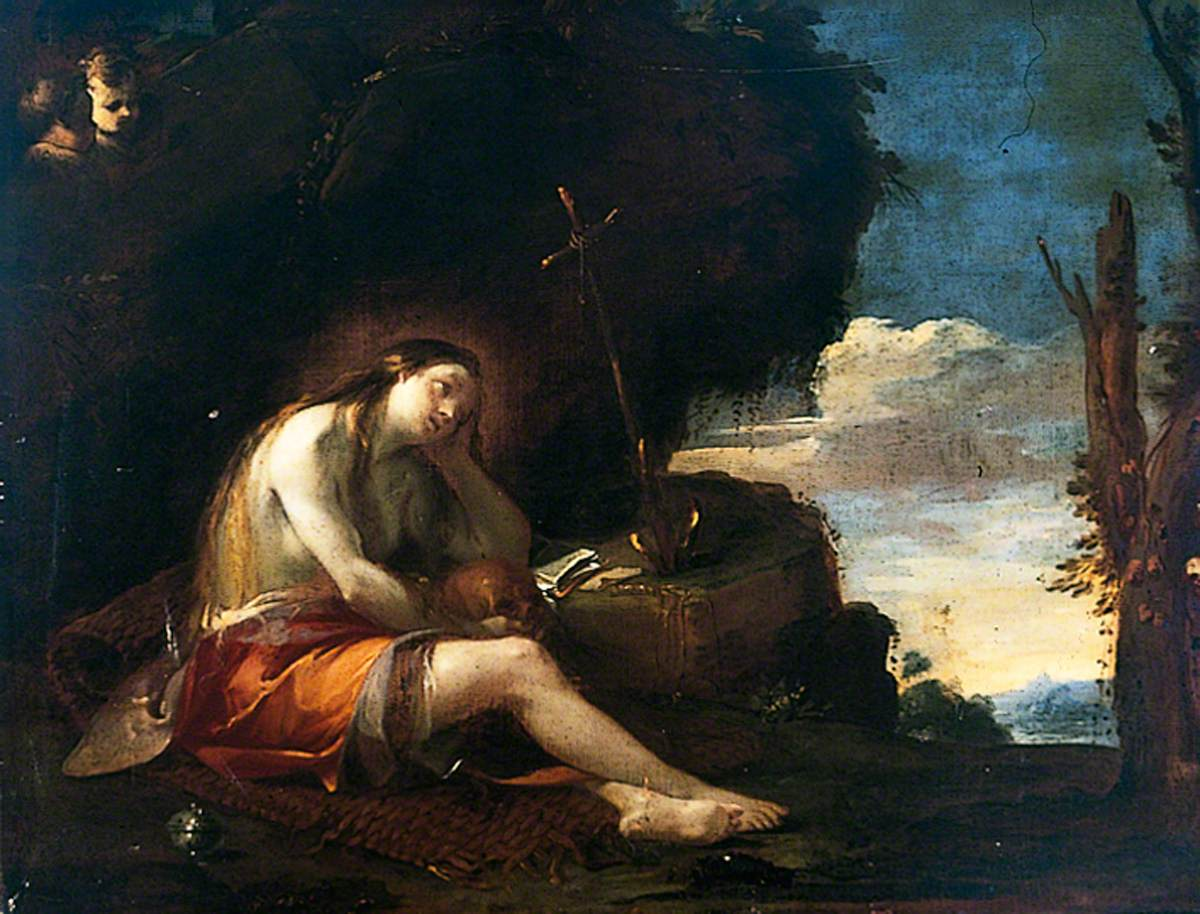
The Penitent Magdalen

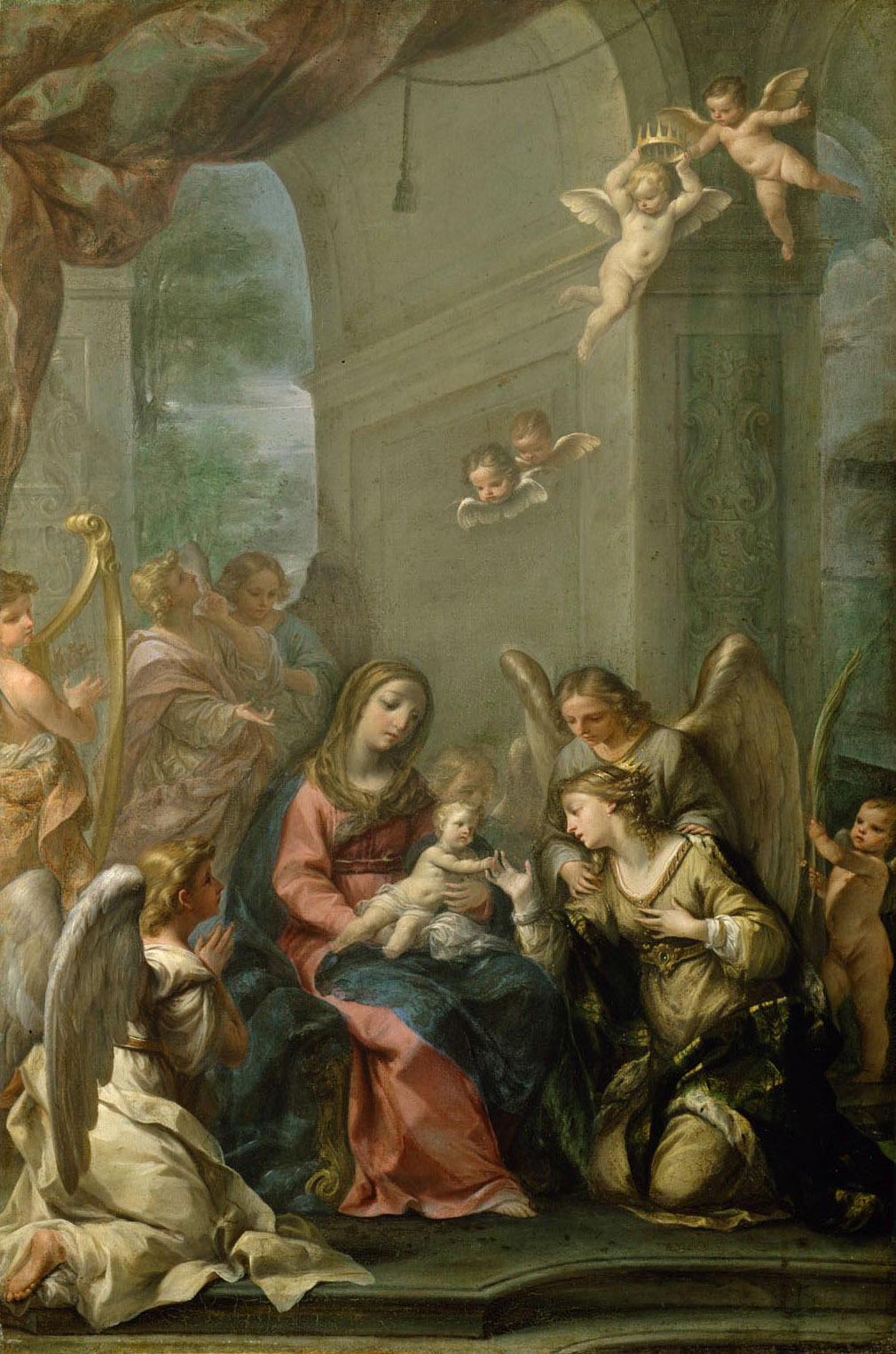
Mystische Verlobung der Hl. Katharina

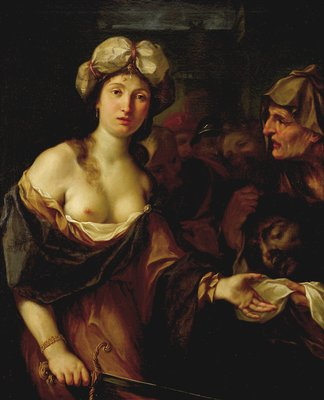
Judith with the Severed Head of Holofernes

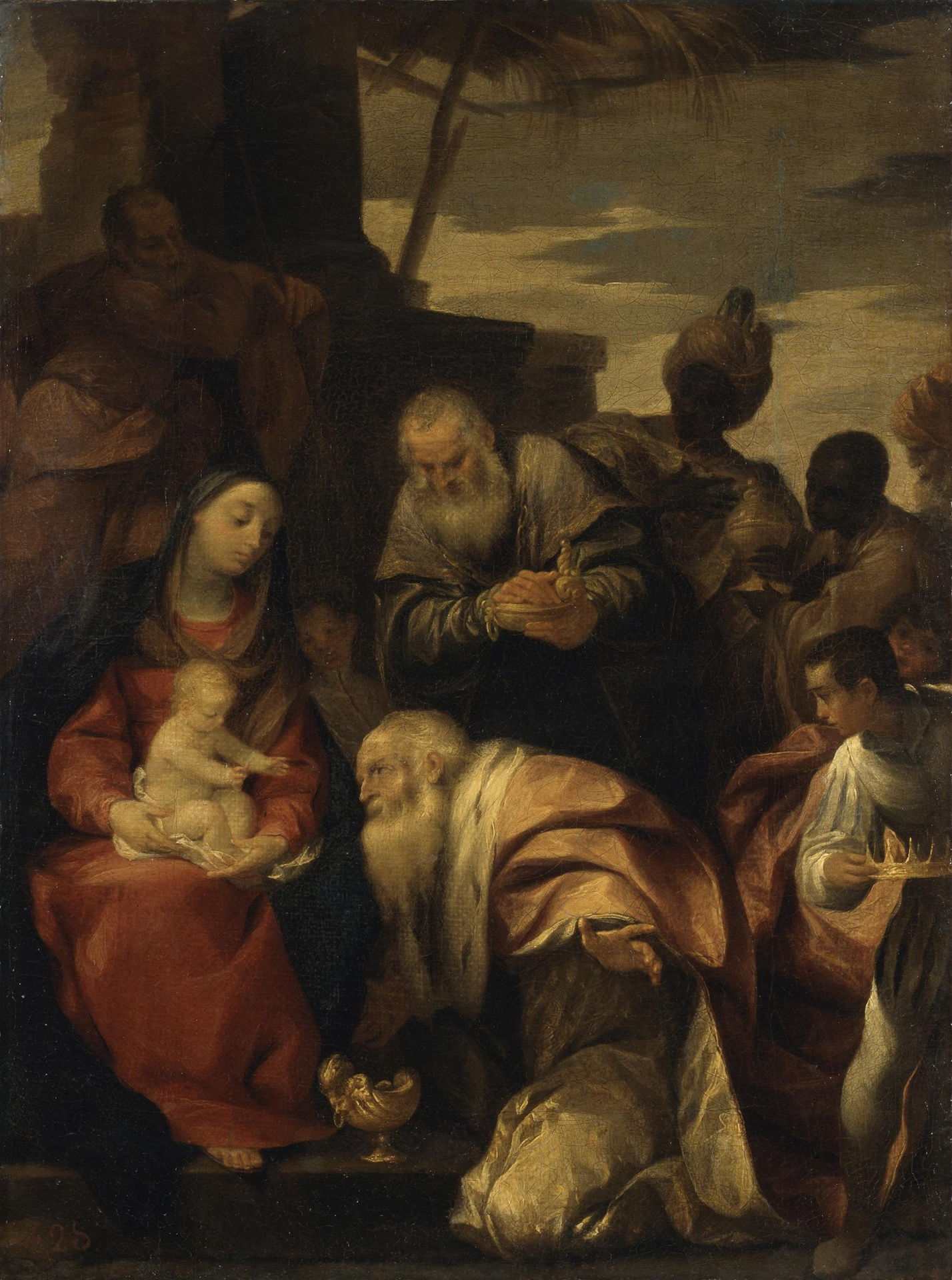
Adoration of the Magi

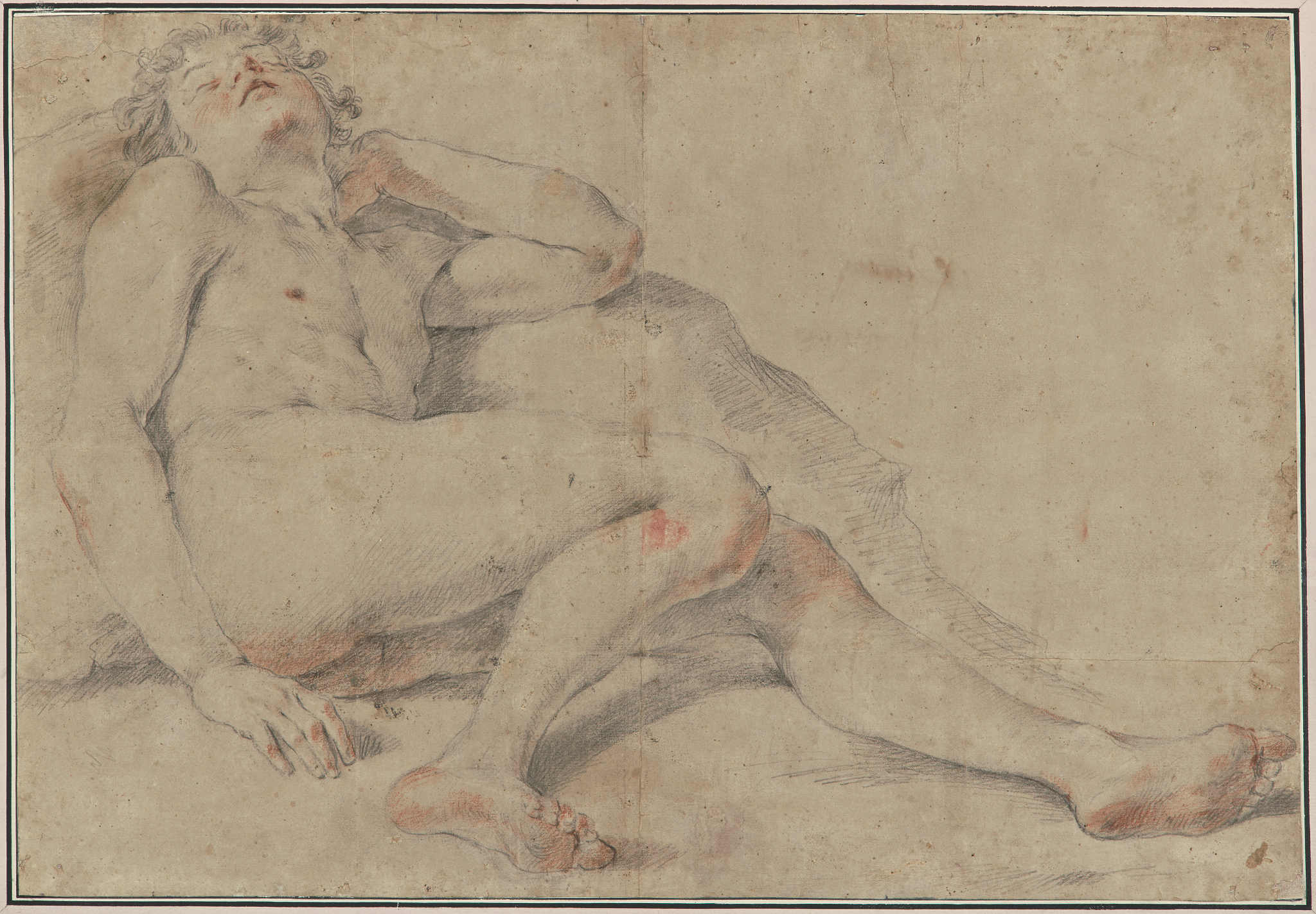
Lying Naked Youth

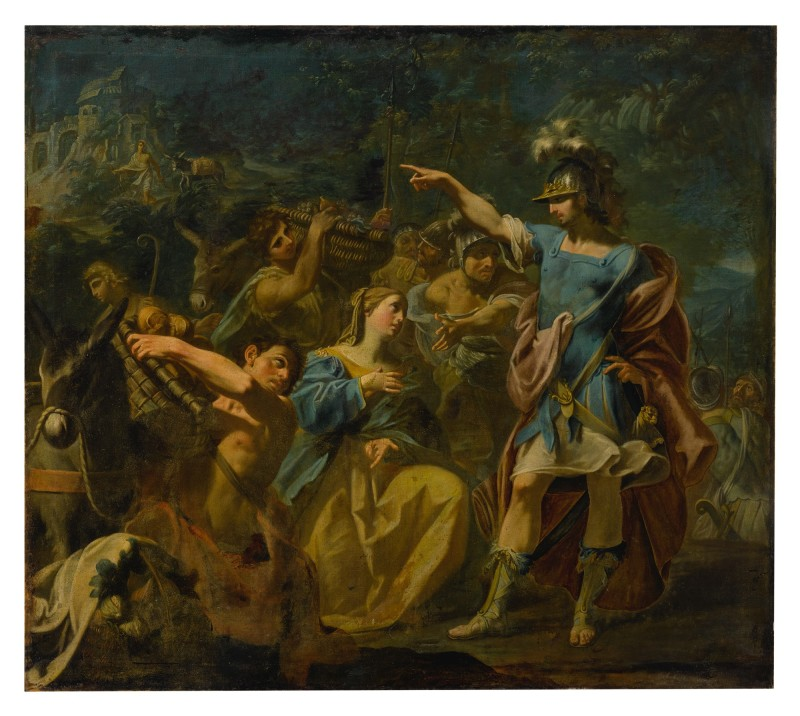
David meeting Abigail

== See also ==
- Lucia Casalini Torelli

== Bibliography ==
- Orlandi, Pellegrino Antonio; Guarienti, Pietro (1719). Abecedario pittorico. Naples.
- Muzzi, Salvatore (1846). Annali della città di Bologna dalle sua origine al 1796. Vol. 8. Bologna: Pe' Tipi di S. Tommaso d'Aquino.
- Scrase, David (1992). "Giovan Gioseffo dal Sole". The Burlington Magazine. pp. 257–258.
