= Marcantonio Chiarini =

Italian painter

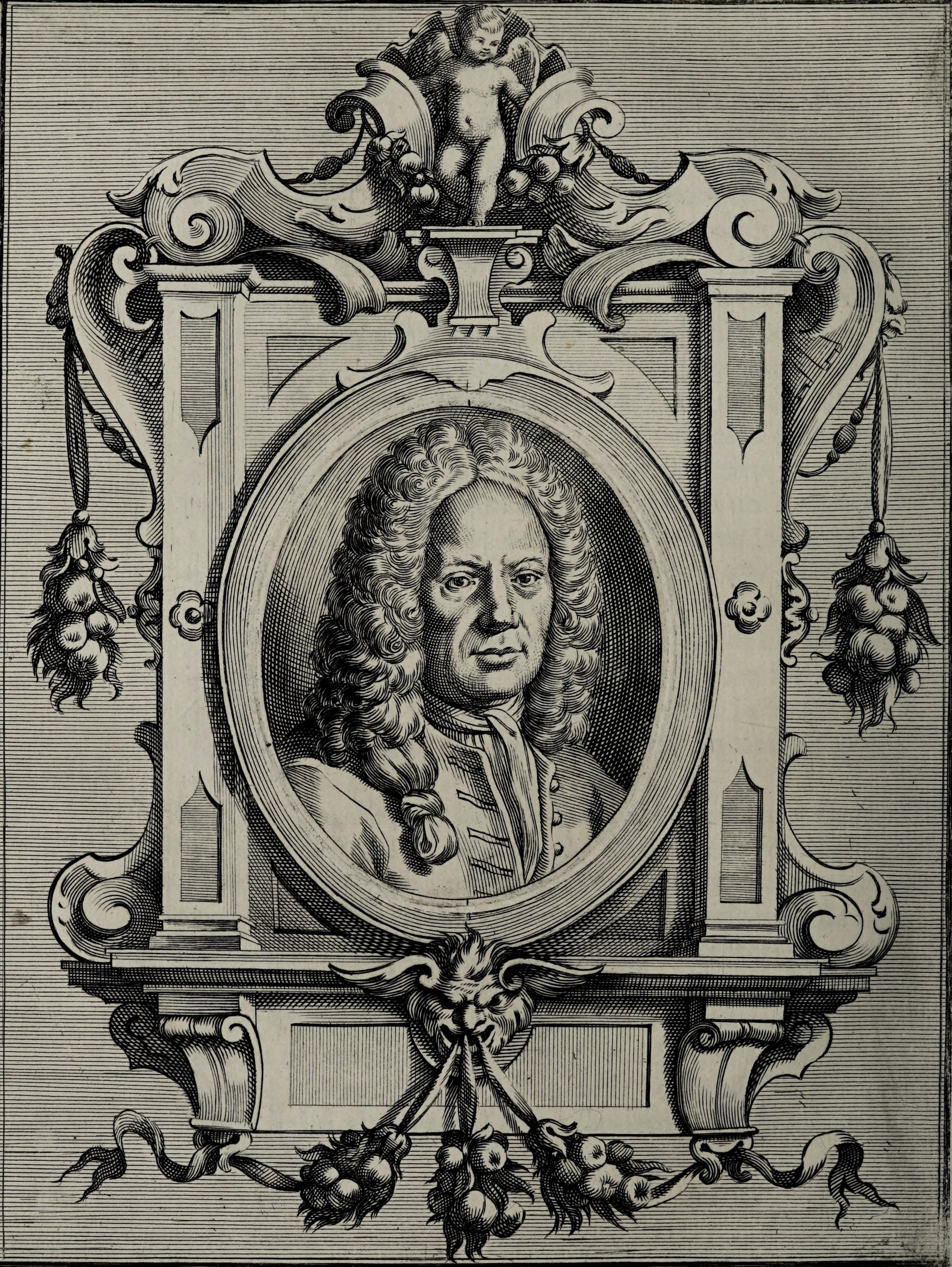
Portrait of Marcantonio Chiarini

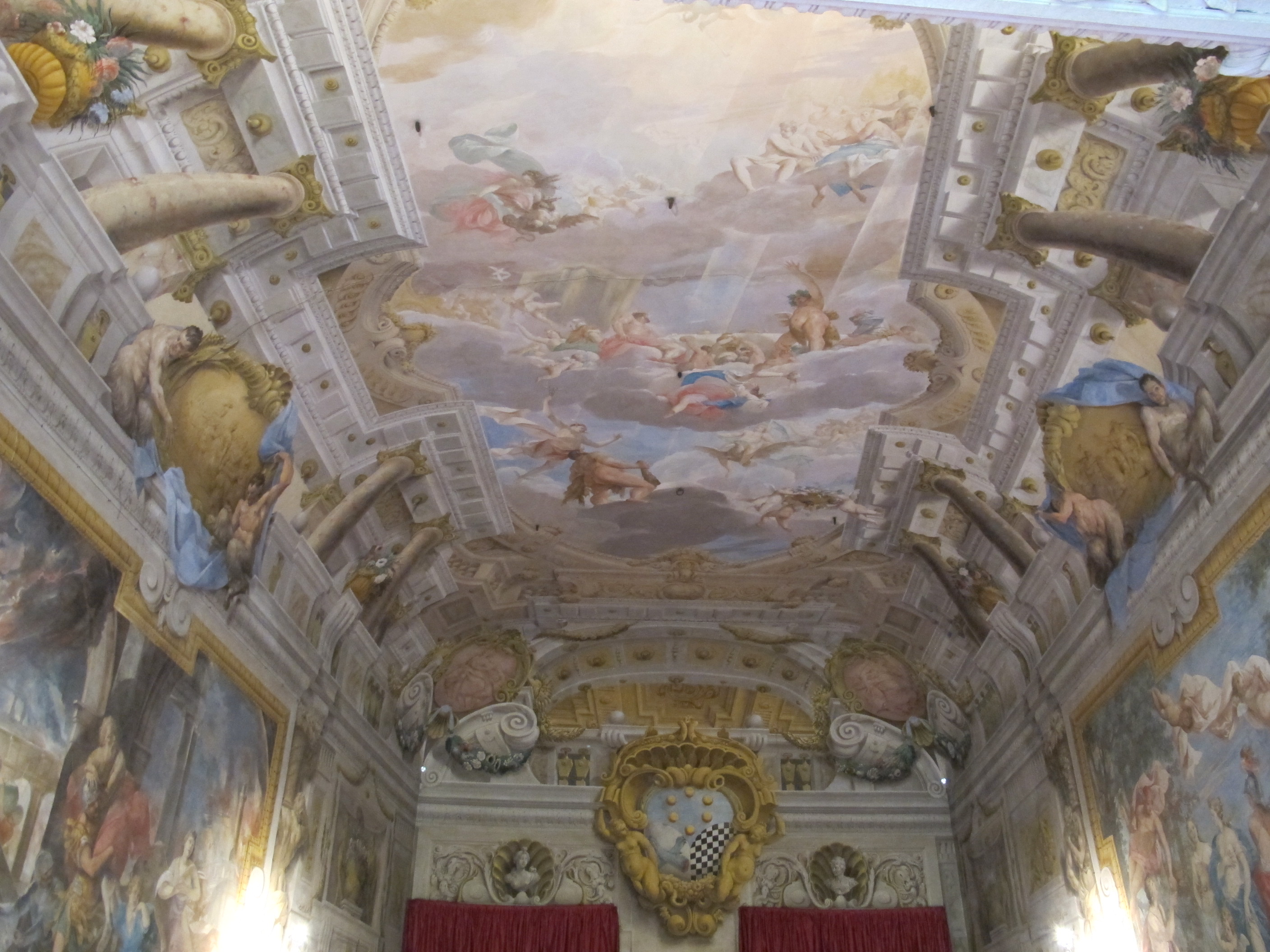
Ceiling quadratura for Palazzo Mansi in Lucca.

Marcantonio Chiarini (c. 1652–1730) was an Italian painter of the late-Baroque period. Born near Bologna, he trained with Francesco Quaino and Domenico Santi. He painted scenography for plays as well as quadratura in which Sigismondo Caula inserted figures. Active in Bologna and Milan, he also painted the quadratura of the Palazzo Mansi in Lucca, for which Giovanni Gioseffo dal Sole painted the main frescoes. Chiarini was employed by the architect Johann Lukas von Hildebrandt in the fresco decoration of the upper and lower Belvedere palaces near Vienna, work shared with Martino Altomonte, Gaetano Fanti, and Carlo Carlone.
