= Lucia Casalini Torelli =

Italian artist (1677–1762)

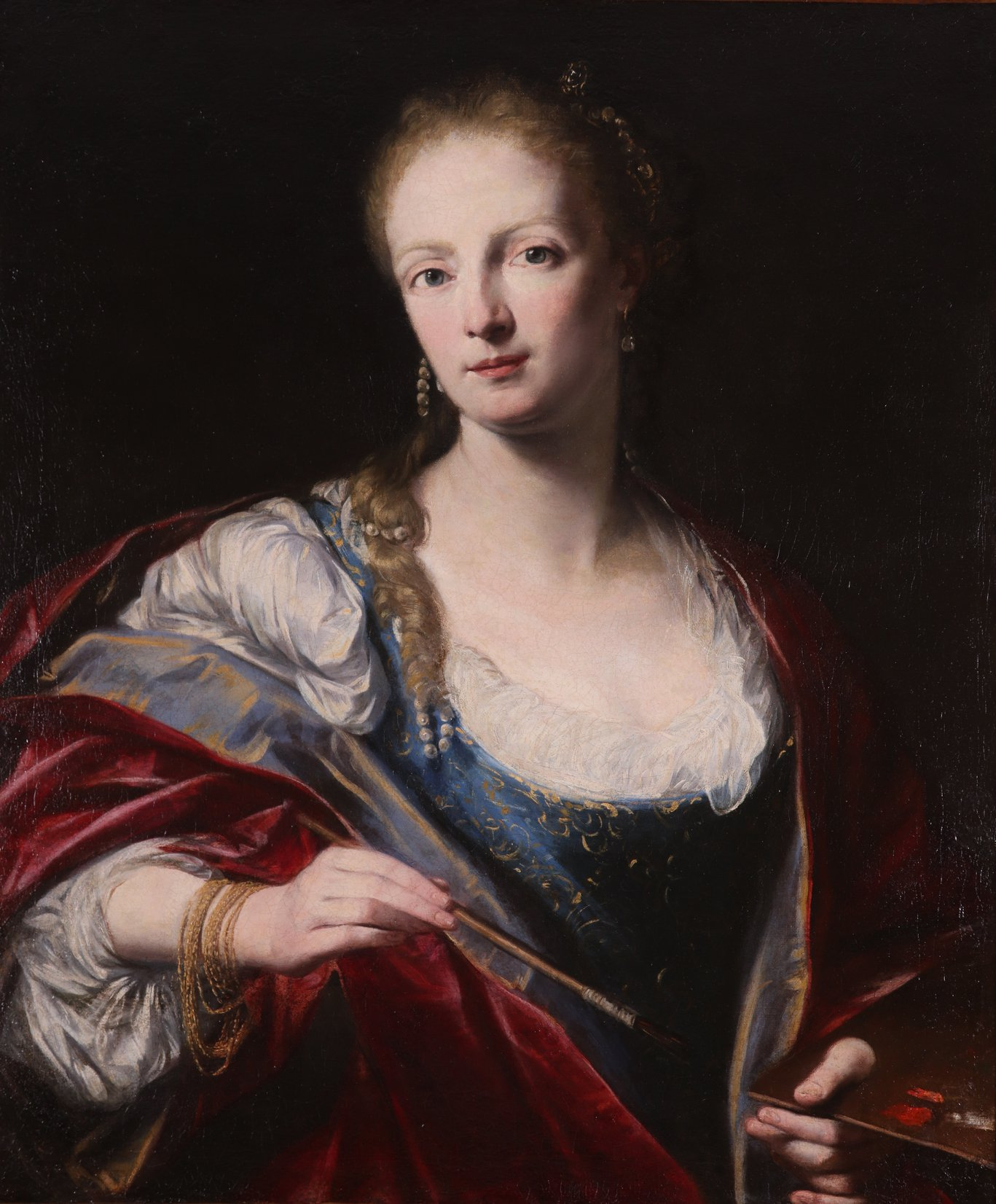
- Self-Portrait
- Born: Lucia Casalini; 1677; Bologna, Papal States
- Died: 1762 (aged 84–85); Bologna, Papal States
- Known for: Painting
- Spouse: Felice Torelli
- Awards: Italian

Lucia Casalini Torelli (1677–1762) was an Italian painter, active in Bologna. The wife of painter Felice Torelli (and, through him, sister-in-law of violinist and composer Giuseppe Torelli), she was the mother of painter Stefano Torelli. She was born in Bologna, where she trained under Giovanni Gioseffo dal Sole.

== Life and works ==
Daughter of Antonio Casalini and Antonia Bandiera, she began studying painting with her cousin, Carlo Casalini. However at the age of thirteen she entered the atelier of the prominent Bolognese painter, Giovanni Gioseffo Dal Sole. Here she met her future husband, also a successful painter Felice Torelli, who was regularly sent by the master to the young girl's home to bring her drawings to copy. The two married in 1701, and soon opened their own studio with students. They had seven children, two of whom, Anna and Stefano, became artists. In 1706, Felice Torelli was one of the founders of the Accademia Clementina; Lucia was elected an honorary member in 1726, a few years after Rosalba Carriera became a member of the Academy. The active participation of Lucia and Felice in the Academy contributed to their artistic and social success in Bologna.

Casalini Torelli's works were mostly of sacred subjects, but she also specialized as a portrait painter, creating portraits of the prominent Bolognese families of the era. Among others, she painted various ecclesiastical portraits such as Cardinals Ruffo, Spinola, Doria, Gozzadini. In Vite de' Pittori Bolognesi, non descritte nella Felsina Pittrice (1769), the author, Luigi Crespi makes note that:

Ma qual Dama, qual Cavaliere, non ha ella ritratto questa indefessa pittrice?

Translation:

But what Lady, and what Lord, has this indefatigable artist not portrayed ?

The Emilian artist was widowed in 1748 and died in Bologna May 18, 1762, at the age of 85. Many of her works are lost. The church of San Domenico, in Imola, conserves an altarpiece painted by her which depicts Saint Thomas Aquinas.

== Bibliography ==
- Bice Viallet, Gli autoritratti femminili delle RR. Gallerie degli Uffizi, Roma 1911.
- Timon Henricus Fokker, Catalogo della Galleria Doria Pamphili in Roma, Roma 1954.
- Lisa Laffi, Cento passi di donne, Bacchilega editore, Imola 2017.
- Grazia Badino, in Giovanna Giusti (a cura di), Autoritratte. Artiste di capriccioso e destrissimo ingegno. ‘I Mai Visti X', catalogo della mostra (Firenze, Sala delle Reali Poste, 17 dicembre 2010-30 gennaio 2011), Firenze, Polistampa, p. 52.
- Jane Fortune - Linda Falcone(Advancing Women Artists Foundation), Invisibile women. Forgotten artist of Florence, Florence: The Florentine, 2010, p. 216.
- Jane Fortune - Linda Falcone (Advancing Women Artists Foundation), Art by Women in Florence. A guide through 500 years, Florence: The Florentine, 2012, p. .
