= James Pearn =

British art expert and auctioneer

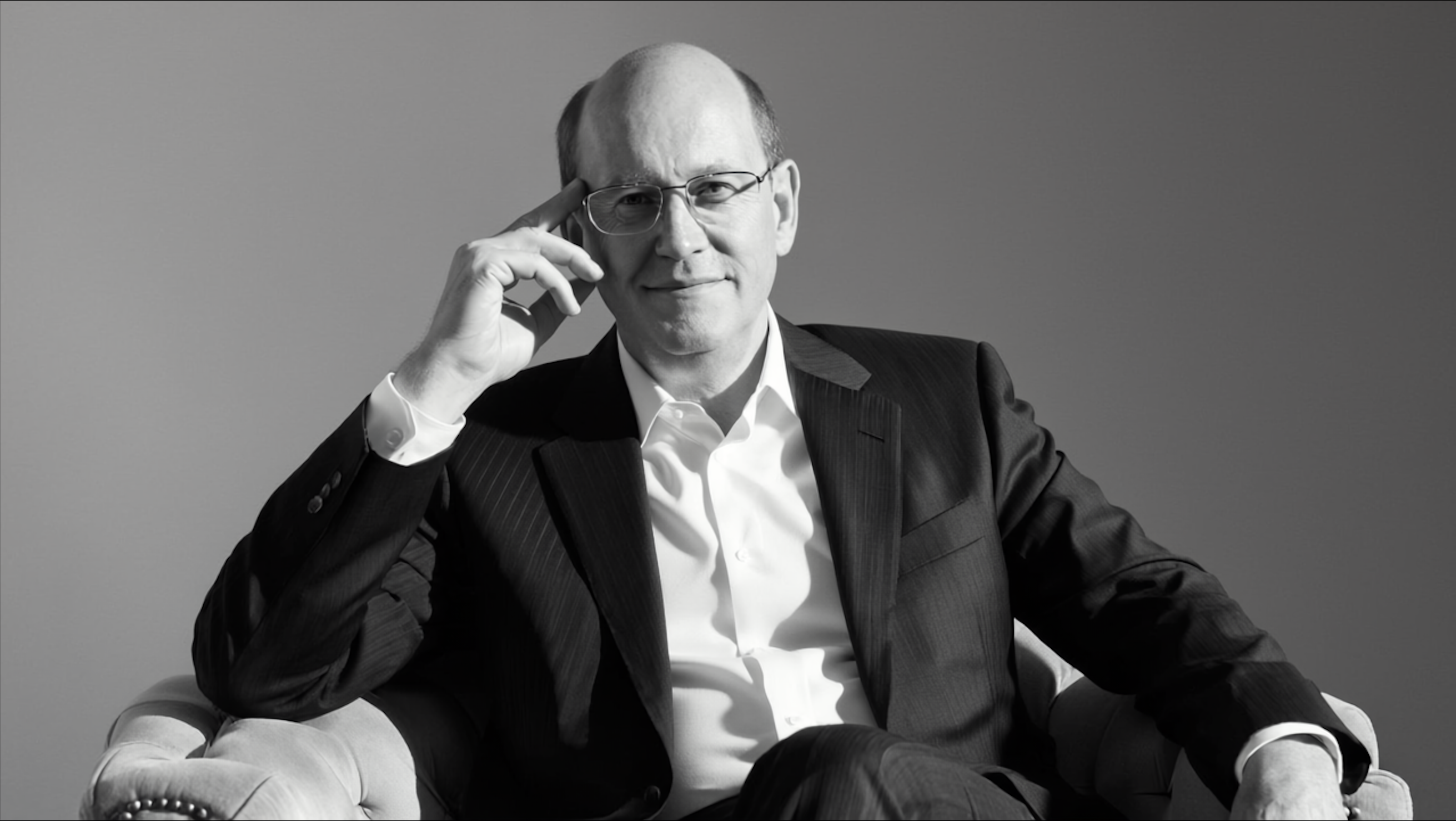
- Occupations: Appraiser; Auctioneer
- Known for: Discovery of lost Turner watercolor (2024)
- Website: jamespearnfineart.com

James Pearn is a British art expert, appraiser, and auctioneer specialising in British and European paintings from the period c. 1650–1950. In 2024 he attributed a previously lost watercolour by J. M. W. Turner. Pearn operates an independent fine art consultancy based in the West Midlands of England and also serves as a specialist picture consultant for various auction houses.

== Career ==
Pearn has worked as a picture auctioneer in both London and regional auction houses. He has also been associated with Halls Fine Art in Shrewsbury, where he served as a judge for the firm's Young Artist competition.

As a consultant, he advises UK auctioneers. He also serves as a specialist picture consultant for Minster Auctions in Leominster, Herefordshire.

In addition to his work with auction houses, Pearn runs his own private consultancy, James Pearn Fine Art. The firm is based in the Midlands and serves the counties of Shropshire, Worcestershire, and Herefordshire. It offers services including specialist picture research, acting as an agent for clients at auction, and arranging private treaty sales. His professional website states that during his career, he has personally catalogued and auctioned paintings with a combined hammer total exceeding £12 million.

== Turner Watercolour Discovery ==
In 2024, Pearn identified unsigned watercolour by Joseph Mallord William Turner, one of Britain's most renowned artists. The discovery was widely reported by news organisations including the BBC, Smithsonian Magazine, and Artnet News.

=== Discovery and attribution ===
The painting was discovered in the attic of Kinsham Court, a country estate in Herefordshire, by descendants of the Arkwright family. It had been stored for decades among what Pearn described as "mid-19th century watercolours and hunting prints which were nothing very exciting". Upon examining the contents of the file, Pearn identified the work as a potential Turner. He told the BBC, "I have to say, I had a pretty good idea of what it was. This is the excitement of my job, every day something new comes in".

As the work was unsigned, its attribution rested on an expert eye. Pearn convinced art authorities by identifying the artist's distinctive style, stating that "the signature is in the style". He elaborated on the specific technical markers he identified: "The style, the composition and the way he painted the foliage and the brushwork are the signatures of Turner". He also pointed to Turner's "little idiosyncrasies about his technique—the way in which he drew the trees, the way he filled in the shadow, the way he put various combinations of animals together," noting they were "quite comparable to other examples of his work at this time".

=== Provenance and auction ===
The watercolour depicts Hampton Court Castle, Herefordshire, and is dated to approximately 1796, when Turner was about 21 years old. It was commissioned by George Capell-Coningsby, Viscount Malden, the 5th Earl of Essex, who owned the estate at the time. In 1810, the estate and its contents were sold to industrialist Richard Arkwright. The painting remained with the Arkwright family, eventually moving with them to Kinsham Court, where it was later rediscovered.

The painting was consigned for auction with a pre-sale estimate of £30,000–£50,000. At the sale on 6 March 2024, the watercolour sold for a hammer price of £96,000, significantly exceeding its estimate.

== Other notable attributions ==
According to his professional website, Pearn has discovered and attributed works by several other notable artists during his career. These include paintings by Philip Wilson Steer, Henry Scott Tuke, Gaetano Gandolfi, Nicholas Berchem, and C. R. W. Nevinson.
