= Serafino Viani =

Italian painter

Sebastiano Viani (26 July 1768 – 1 July 1803) was an Italian painter, who distinguished himself as a patriot during the French occupation of the Duchy of Parma and his native Reggio-Emilia.

As a young man, he studied painting and design in Bologna under Gaetano Gandolfi, and briefly in Modena under Giuseppe Maria Soli. While wishing to travel to Florence and Rome to continue his craft, his circumstances forced him to seek work in Reggio by 1790. Here he painted a San Francesco di Paola for the church of San Pellegrino. After the revolutionary French armies arrived to Reggio in July 1796, he joined the newly formed National Guard. He was captured in 1799 by the Austrio-Russian, but escaped from prison when he was to be transferred to Germany. When there was a renewed occupation by French army, he regained military honors. However, his patriotic ideals clashed with Napoleonic ambitions, and he left the command of the National Guard. He died at a young age of epilepsy.
