= Giuseppe Maria Soli =

Italian architect (1747–1822)

Adeodato Malatesta, Portrait of Giuseppe Maria Soli, c. 1840, Civic Museum of Modena

Giuseppe Maria Soli (23 June 1747 – 20 October 1822) was an Italian Neoclassical architect.

== Biography ==
Giuseppe Maria Soli was born in Vignola on 23 June 1747, to a peasant family. After taking note of his talent, Count Carlo Malvasia patronized his education at the Academy of Fine Arts of Bologna. From there, the city of Modena awarded him a scholarship to study in Rome. He returned to Modena to found and direct their Academy of Fine Arts. he was made architect to the court of Modena.

Upon the Napoleonic reorganization of northern Italy into the Cisalpine Republic, he was named professor of design for the Military Academy of Modena. He was recruited to design various defensive works in Milan, Mantua, and Venice. Upon the Ducal restoration, he remained at his court position.

He designed the Palazzo Bellucci in Vignola; the church in Carbognano near Rome; the bridges across the Panaro river between Modena and Bologna and a bridge in Rimini; and three of the façades and two staircases of the Ducal Palace of Modena. He also lent himself to painting. He helped edit the Manuale di architettura del Branca (1789, Modena). He putatively played a role in the plans for the west end of Piazza San Marco. One of his pupils was Serafino Viani.

== Bibliography ==
- Vandelli, Vincenzo (2019). "SOLI, Giuseppe Maria". Dizionario Biografico degli Italiani (in Italian). Vol. 93: Sisto V–Stammati. Rome: Institute of the Italian Encyclopaedia. ISBN 978-88-12-00032-6.
