= Mauro Gandolfi =

Italian painter and engraver

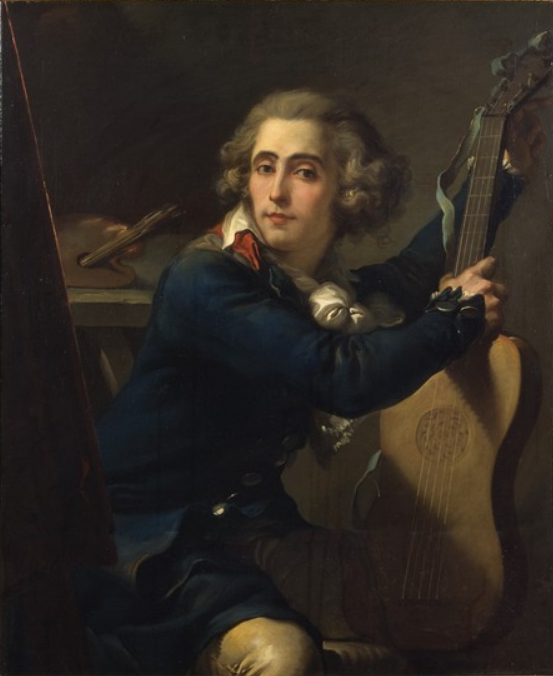
Self-portrait by Mauro Gandolfi, Pinacoteca Nazionale di Bologna, 1785

Mauro Gandolfi (18 September 1764 – 4 January 1834) was an Italian painter, water colorist and engraver of the Bolognese School.

== Life ==
Gandolfi was born in Bologna as the son of Gaetano and Giovanna Spisani. The Gandolfi family were a family of artists. His father and uncle Ubaldo Gandolfi were prominent painters and sculptors of the Bolognese school. They are considered to be the last representatives of the grand manner of the Bolognese school of painting, which had established itself almost two centuries earlier with the group of painters trained by the Carracci. The Bolognese school of painting focused on realistic depictions of human anatomy and drawing from live models.

Mauro had six younger brothers, who all became artists. As a child, he was often used as a model by his father who also taught him the art of drawing. His restless nature led him to leave home and join the Corsican Royal Regiment in Marseille. He spent time in Strassbourg and Arras and was able to support himself with his drawing skills.

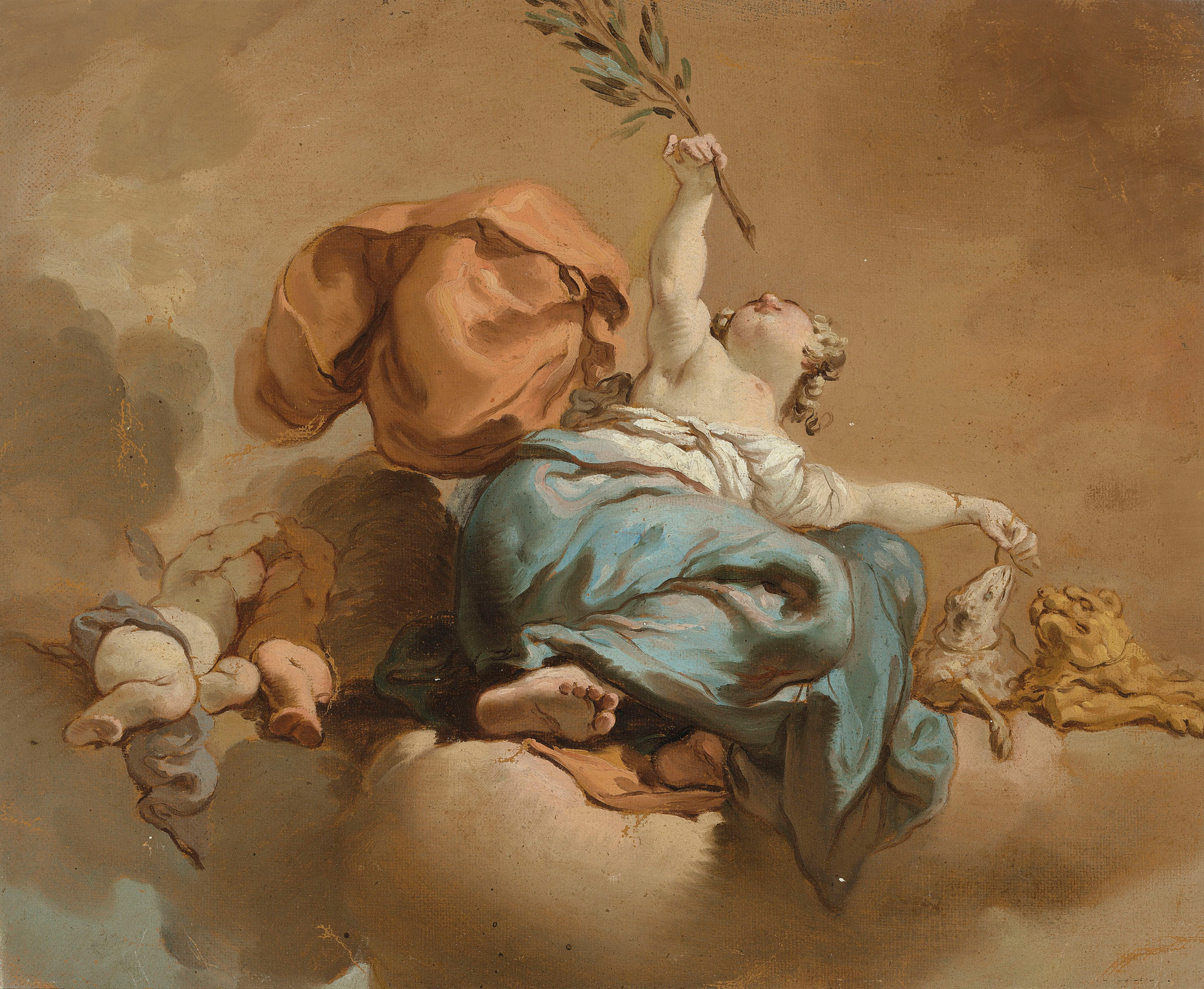
Allegory of Peace, 1790s

In 1791 he returned to Bologna and started his studies at the Accademia Clementina. He was professor in figure drawing from 1794 to 1797. At the same time he worked in his father's workshop and realised some of his best-known works. In 1792 he married Laura Maria Zanetti, with whom he had two children Clementina, a painter, and Raphael, who died at age 19 in the Napoleonic War in Spain. His first wife died in 1895. Democrito, a sculptor. Hi remarried the next year with Caterina Delpino, with whom he would have a stormy relationship. Their son Democrito, was born on 28 October 1796 and became a sculptor.

After the turn of the century he switched to engraving and watercolors. In 1801, he moved to Paris where he specialized as an engraver. He made engraved reproductions of the works in French museums and of his father's works. After returning to Italy, he worked as an engraver in Bologna. In April 1816, he traveled with his mistress to the United States where they visited New York City, Philadelphia and Niagara Falls. He sailed back home in September 1816. Six years after his return to Italy, he wrote an account of his American travels in the form of a series of letters addressed to a (possibly imaginary) friend. It appears that one of his objectives was to look for patrons in America but he failed to do so.

In 1833, he wrote his autobiography in which he lists his works from the period he described as his most prolific: between 1786 and 1796. He died in Bologna in 1834. At the time of his death, he had created more than 80 works of art.
