= Felice Torelli =

Italian painter (1667–1748)

- Self-portrait, Uffizi, Florence
- Born: 9 September 1667
- Died: 11 June 1748; Bologna
- Occupation: Painter
- Spouse: Lucia Casalini Torelli
- Children: Stefano Torelli, Anna Torelli

Felice Torelli (9 September 1667 – 11 June 1748) was an Italian Baroque painter active mainly in Bologna, Papal States.

== Biography ==
=== Early life and education ===
He was born to a family of artists in Verona, including his brother, Giuseppe Torelli, a noted violinist and composer of concerti. Both Felice's wife, Lucia Casalini (1677–1762), and their son, Stefano Torelli, were painters.

Felice began his study of painting in Verona under Santi Prunati. He also pursued an interest in music and moved to Bologna with his older brother Giuseppe, who had been appointed violinist at the Cappella di San Petronio. Felice frequented the studio of Giovanni Gioseffo dal Sole in Bologna and at the same time followed the conventional training of 17th-century Bolognese painters, studying the wall paintings by the Carracci family in the Palazzo Fava and Palazzo Magnani in Bologna. During the last decade of the century he became an important member of the artistic community in Bologna.

=== Early work ===
Torelli's early work shows the strong influence of dal Sole in facial types and the style of figures and drapery; for example St. Sebastian (Bologna, Maccaferri Col.) has been assigned to both dal Sole and Torelli, the former attribution being more likely.

However, Torelli's style evolved towards a more ponderous, dark-toned, astringent manner of considerable power, clearly inspired by the work of Ludovico Carracci. Torelli's work seems anomalous in comparison with the light-hearted and fluent Italian late Baroque art of the period. However, his style bears some relationship to that of Giuseppe Maria Crespi, who was a colleague at the Accademia Clementina, Bologna, which Torelli co-founded in 1710. Torelli's pupils at the academy included two of the most brilliant Bolognese painters of the second half of the 18th century, Ubaldo Gandolfi and his younger brother Gaetano Gandolfi.

=== Maturity ===
Torelli was chiefly involved with the creation of huge, sombre altarpieces depicting characteristic themes of the Counter-Reformation, including popular saints of the time, in ecstasy, being martyred or ascending to Heaven. These works, with their intense discourses between massive figures with darkly impassioned features, were painted for churches in Bologna (e.g. the Ecstasy of St. Camillus de Lellis, San Gregorio) and other Emilian cities (e.g. the Martyrdom of St. Maurelius, Ferrara Cathedral).

However, his reputation was sufficiently widespread also to bring him important commissions from such cities as Turin, Milan, Pisa and Verona (e.g. the Martyrdom of St. Peter Martyr, Verona, Sant'Anastasia). His biblical history painting is represented most impressively in two large horizontal works, Christ and the Canaanite Woman and Christ and the Adulteress (both now Bologna, Santa Maria delle Grazie). Torelli's portraits, which he painted apparently only rarely, are extremely striking, for example the series of four large oval portraits of members of the Malvezzi family of senators (c. 1711–13; Dozza, Rocca). Torelli also painted a Self-portrait (Florence, Uffizi). He married Lucia Casalini (1677–1762), also a pupil of dal Sole and a notable painter, by whom he had five children. His pupils included his nephew, Giovanni Giorgi; Mariano Collina (died 1780); and Antonio Magnoni.

== Gallery ==
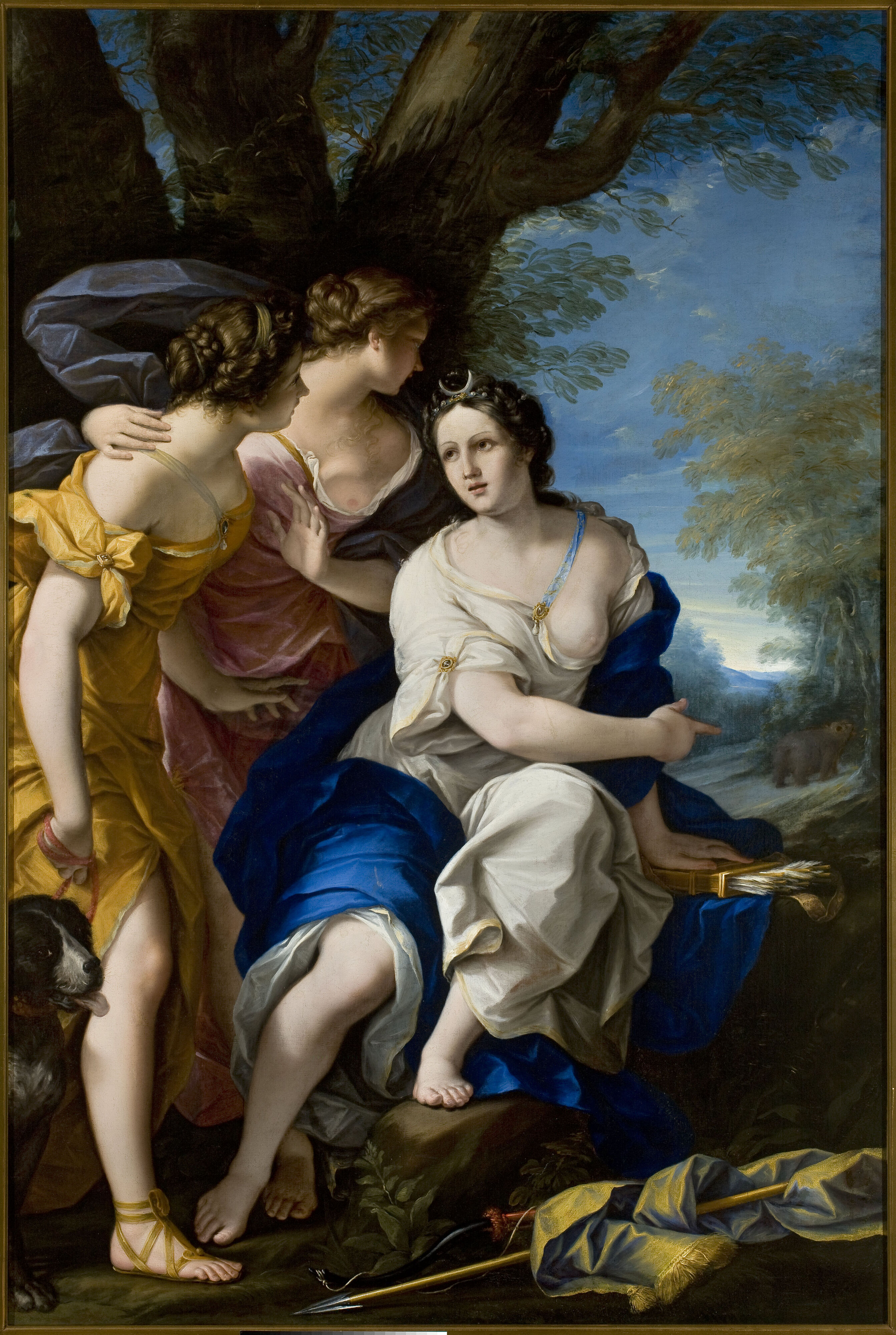
Diana with nymphs

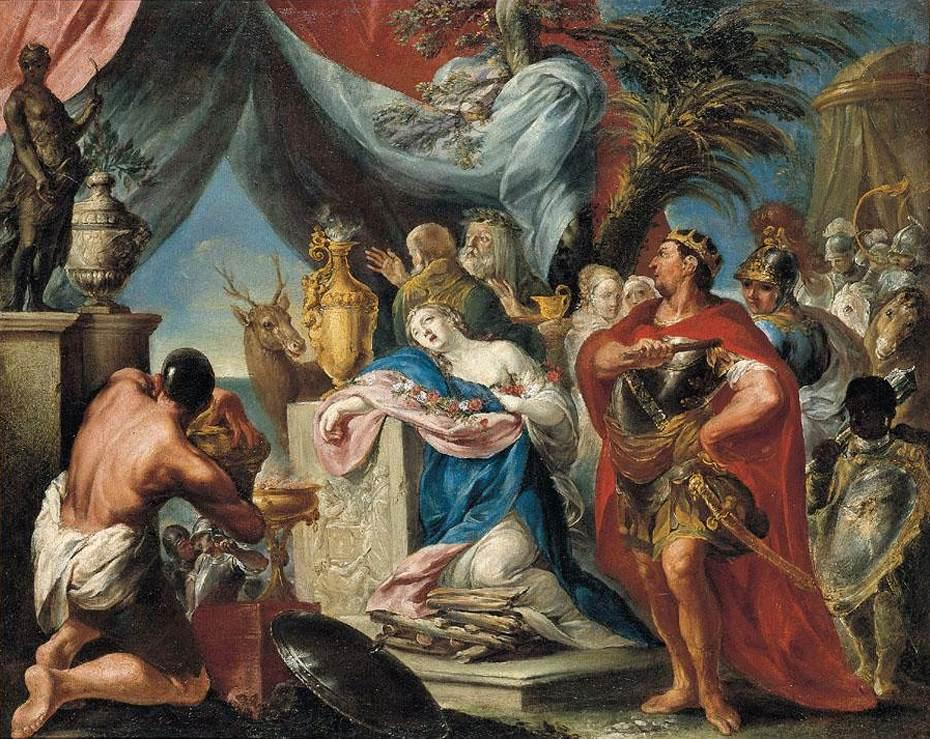
The Sacrifice of Iphigenia

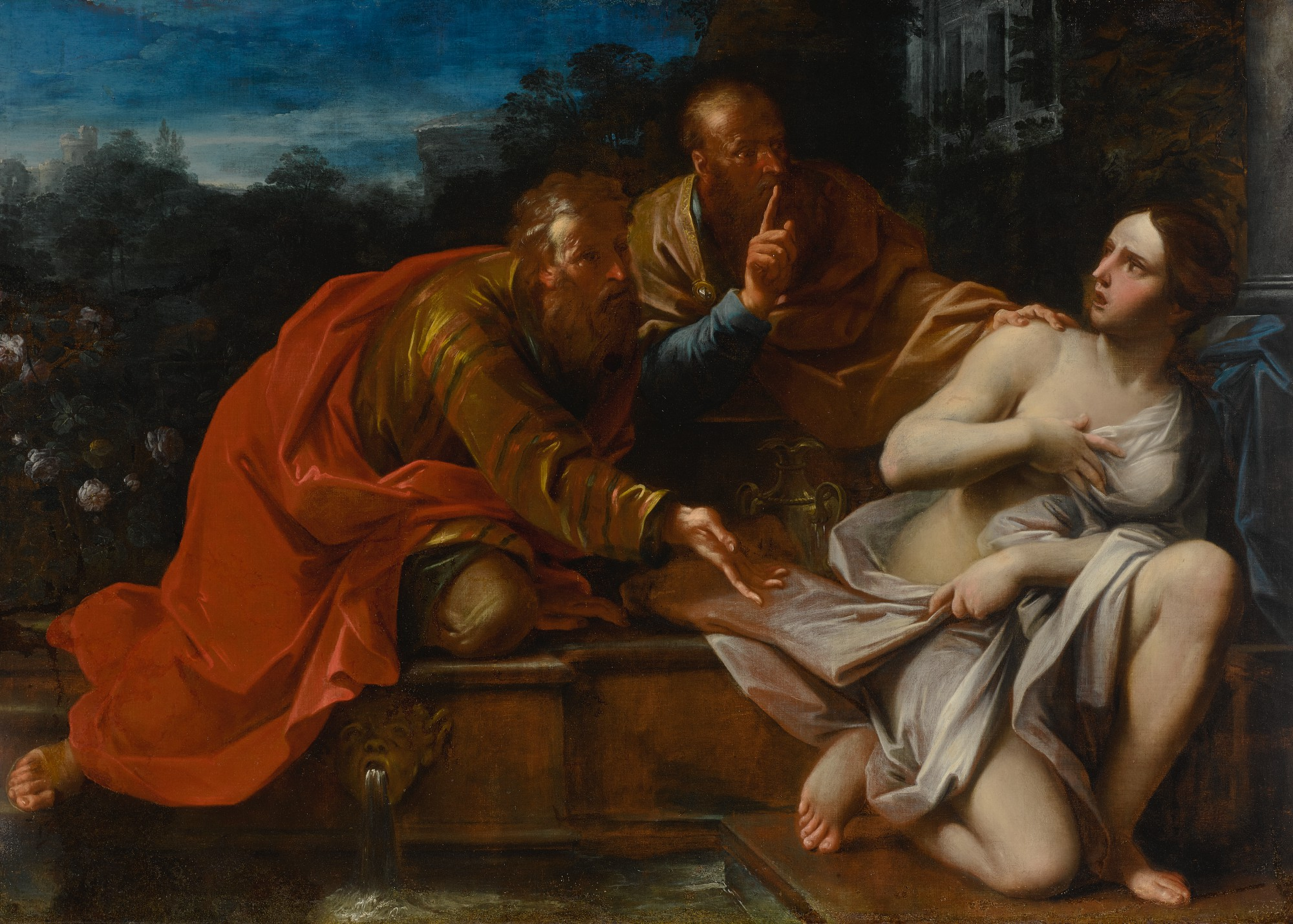
Susanna and the Elders

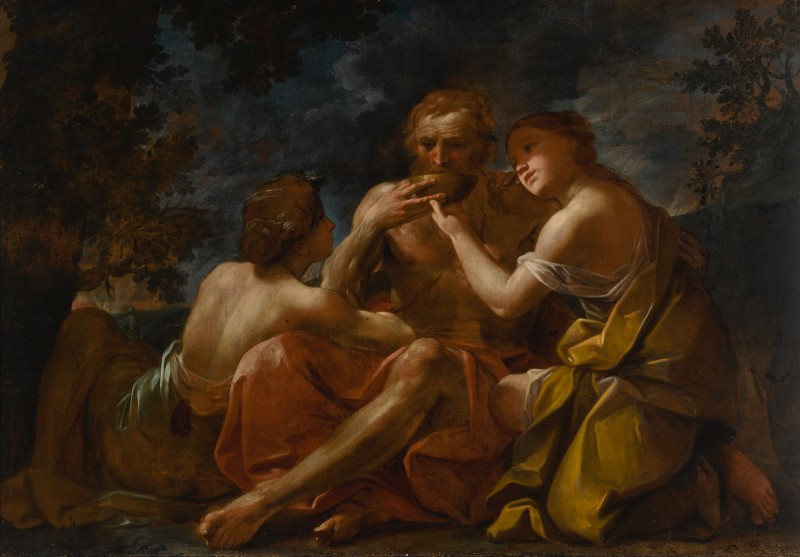
Lot and His Daughters

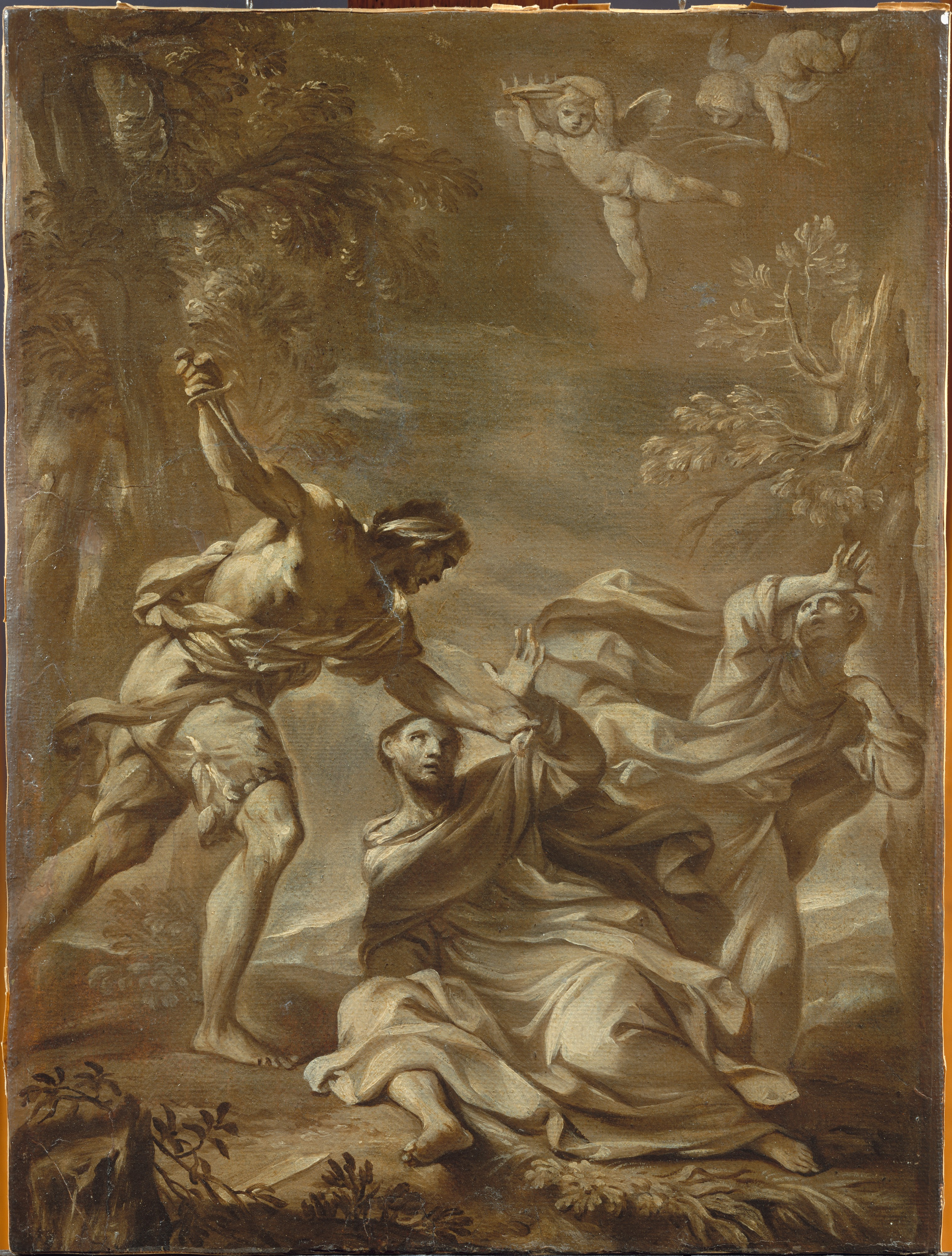
Death of Saint Peter Martyr

== See also ==
- Lucia Casalini Torelli

== Bibliography ==
- Miller, Dwight C. (2003). "Torelli, Felice". Grove Art Online. Oxford University Press. doi:10.1093/oao/9781884446054.013.90000372648.
- Bryan, Michael (1889). Walter Armstrong; Robert Edmund Graves (eds.). Dictionary of Painters and Engravers, Biographical and Critical. Vol. II L-Z. London: George Bell and Sons. pp. 579–580.
