= Nicola Levoli =

Italian painter

Nicola Levoli (1728 – February 21, 1801) was an Italian painter and an Augustinian friar. His name prior to entering the Augustinan order was Remigio Enrico Policarpo.

Levoli was born in Rimini. He was a pupil of Ubaldo Gandolfi, director of the Accademia Clementina in Bologna since 1761. Levoli is noted for painting still-life works and depictions of flowers. The Pinacoteca of Rimini has one of his works. He entered mendicant life on January 29, 1747, in Bologna, in the convent of San Giacomo Maggiore. However, he always leaned to painting, and by 1762 was a member of the Accademia Clementina di Bologna. He won a contest in 1765 for painting flowers and collaborated with Gandolfi on some canvases, painting the flowers and objects. Levoli also painted some altarpieces and sacred works, now lost. By 1769, he had been associated with the convent of San Agostino in Rimini, where he lived till the suppression in 1797 after the French occupation. He was sent to the Convent of Minori Osservanti till his death in 1801.

Zauli Naldi (1961) attributed three still lifes in the Ongaro collection of Milan to Levoli, but the attribution was changed to a follower of Levoli's style, the nobleman from Rimini, Ludovico Soardi, (born 1764). In 1964, further still lifes were discovered, one of these is in the Pinacoteca civica of Faenza. Since then, over half a dozen attributions have been made. Some of them had been previously assigned to Arcangelo Resani. Later paintings resemble the style of Carlo Magini.
