= Giovanni Lipparini =

Italian sculptor

Giovanni Lipparini, Rosolino (died 1788) was an Italian sculptor, active in Bologna. He worked under the painter Ubaldo Gandolfi, but trained under the brothers Fillipo and Giacomo Antonio Scandellari. He completed a bust of the physicist-academic Laura Bassi for the University of Bologna, and a bas-relief for the arch of the church of the Madonna del Baraccano.
