= Ubaldo Gandolfi =

Italian painter (1728–1781)

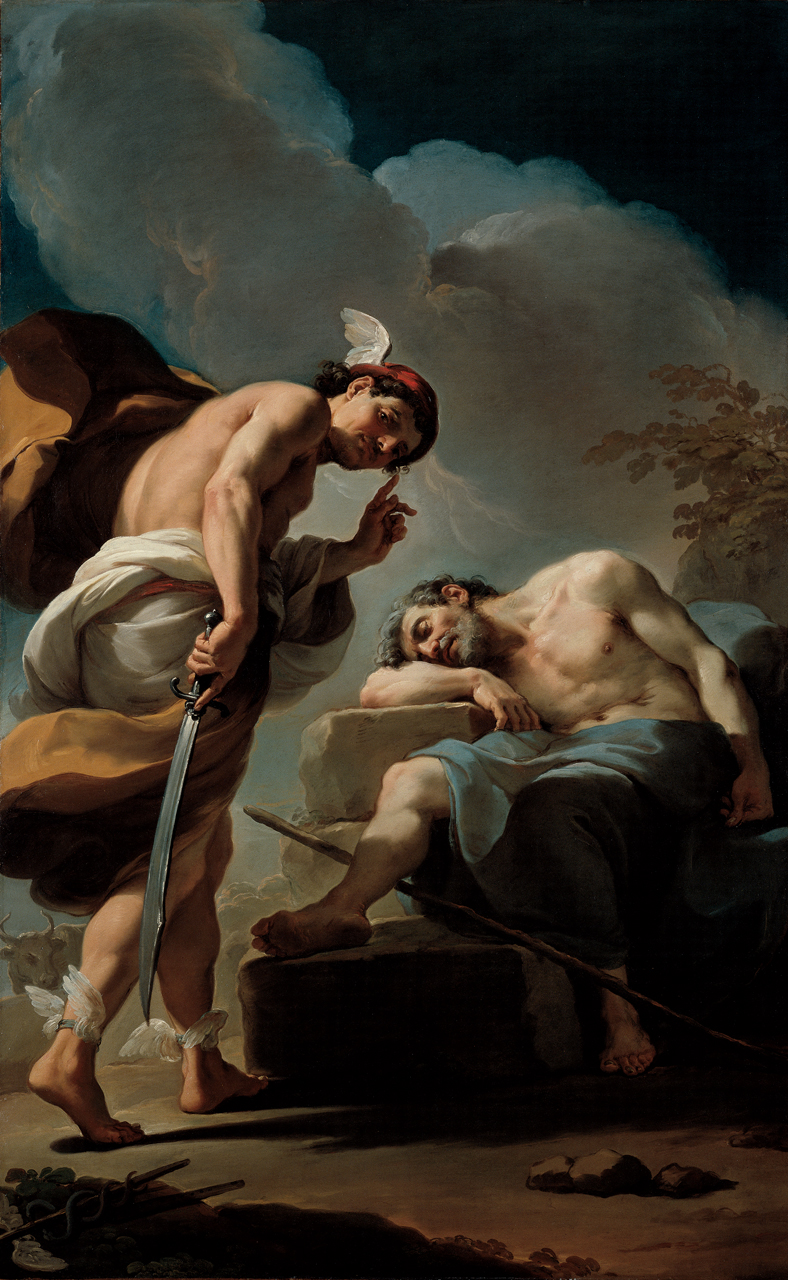
Mercury About to Behead Argus

Ubaldo Gandolfi (1728–1781) was an Italian painter, draughtsman and sculptor of the late-Baroque period, mainly active in and near Bologna. He is known for his biblical, mythological and allegorical subjects as well as his portraits and nudes. Ubaldo and his brother Gaetano were during their lifetime among the first and most celebrated artists of Italy. This fame was gained by the excellent quality of their works, which led to many and important commissions they had from courts and countries all over Europe.

== Life ==
He was born in San Matteo della Decima on an estate in the Po Valley estate which his father managed for a landowner. He enrolled by the age of 17 at the Clementine Academy, where he apprenticed with Ercole Graziani the Younger, Felice Torelli, and Ercole Lelli. The Gandolfi family produced a number of prominent artists, including Ubaldo's brother Gaetano, his own sons Giovanni Battista and Ubaldo Lorenzo, as well as his brother's sons Mauro and grandchildren Democrito (who was a pupil of Antonio Canova) and Clementina. Ubaldo, Gaetano and Mauro are considered among the last representatives of the grand manner of painting characteristic of the Bolognese school, that had risen to prominence nearly two centuries earlier with the members of the Carracci family.The Bolognese school of painting focused on realistic depictions of human anatomy and drawing from live models.

Gandolfi's work ranges from Baroque to Neoclassic styles, and specifically recalls the style of Ludovico Carracci. He completed, in 1770–1775, a series of canvases on mythological narratives for the Palazzo Marescalchi in Bologna (two are now in Museum of North Carolina). A series of seven saints painted by Gandolfi is on display at the Quadreria of the Palazzo Rossi Poggi Marsili in Bologna. He died in Ravenna in 1781.

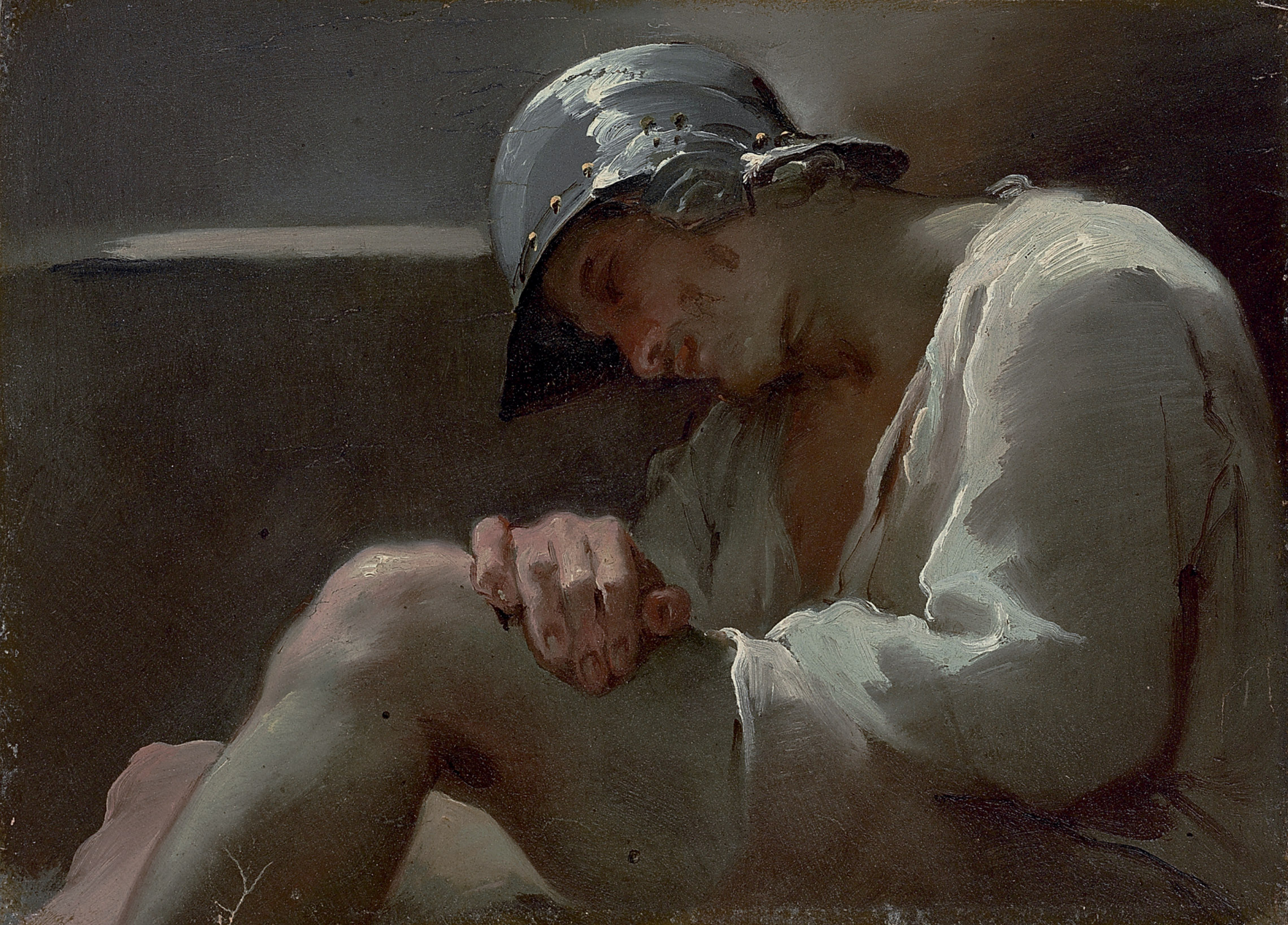
Sleeping Legionary

His pupils include Giuseppe Grimanti, Giovanni Lipparini (il Rosolino), and Nicola Levoli.

== Gallery ==
Selected works

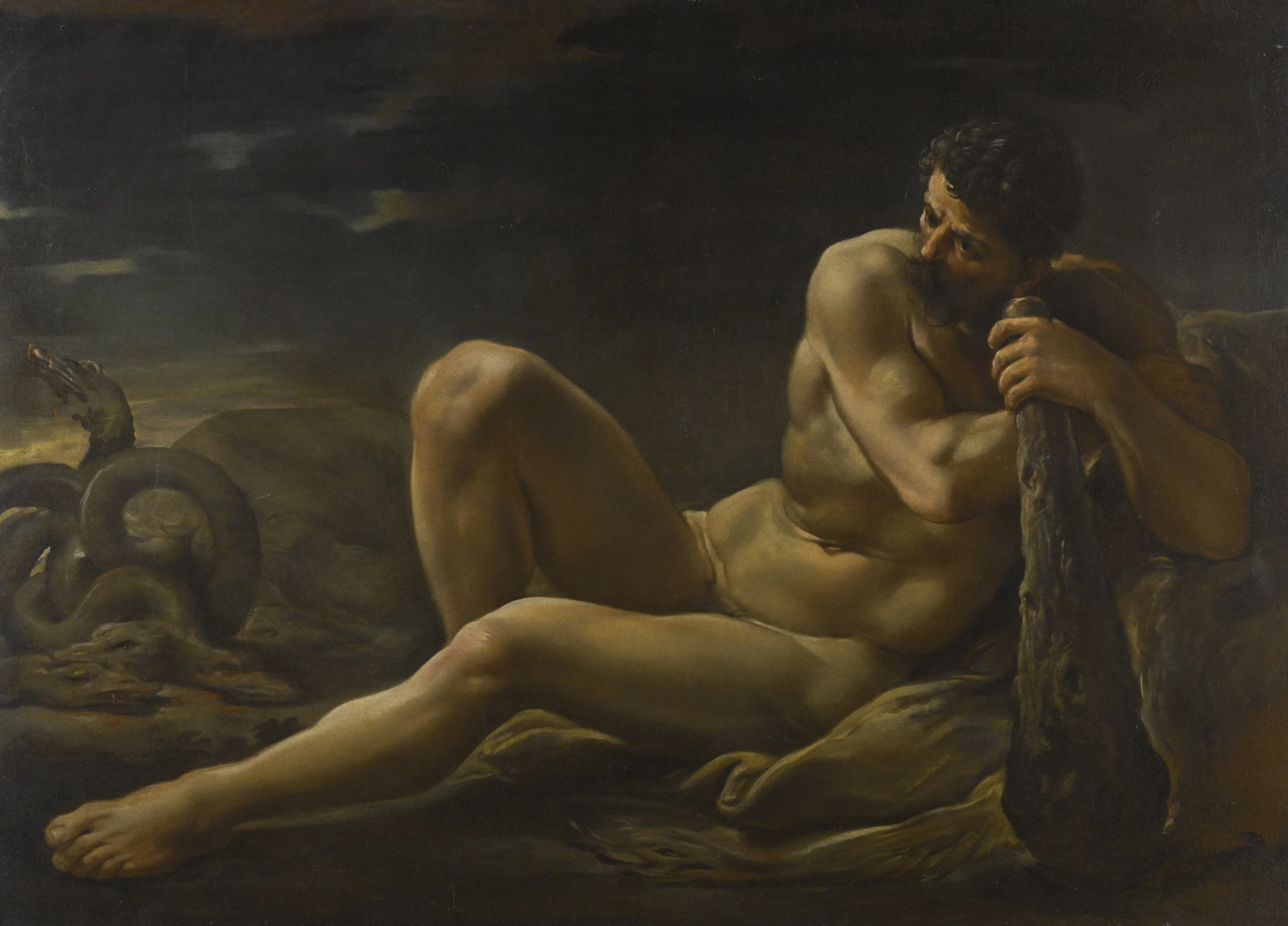
Hercules and the Lernean Hydra

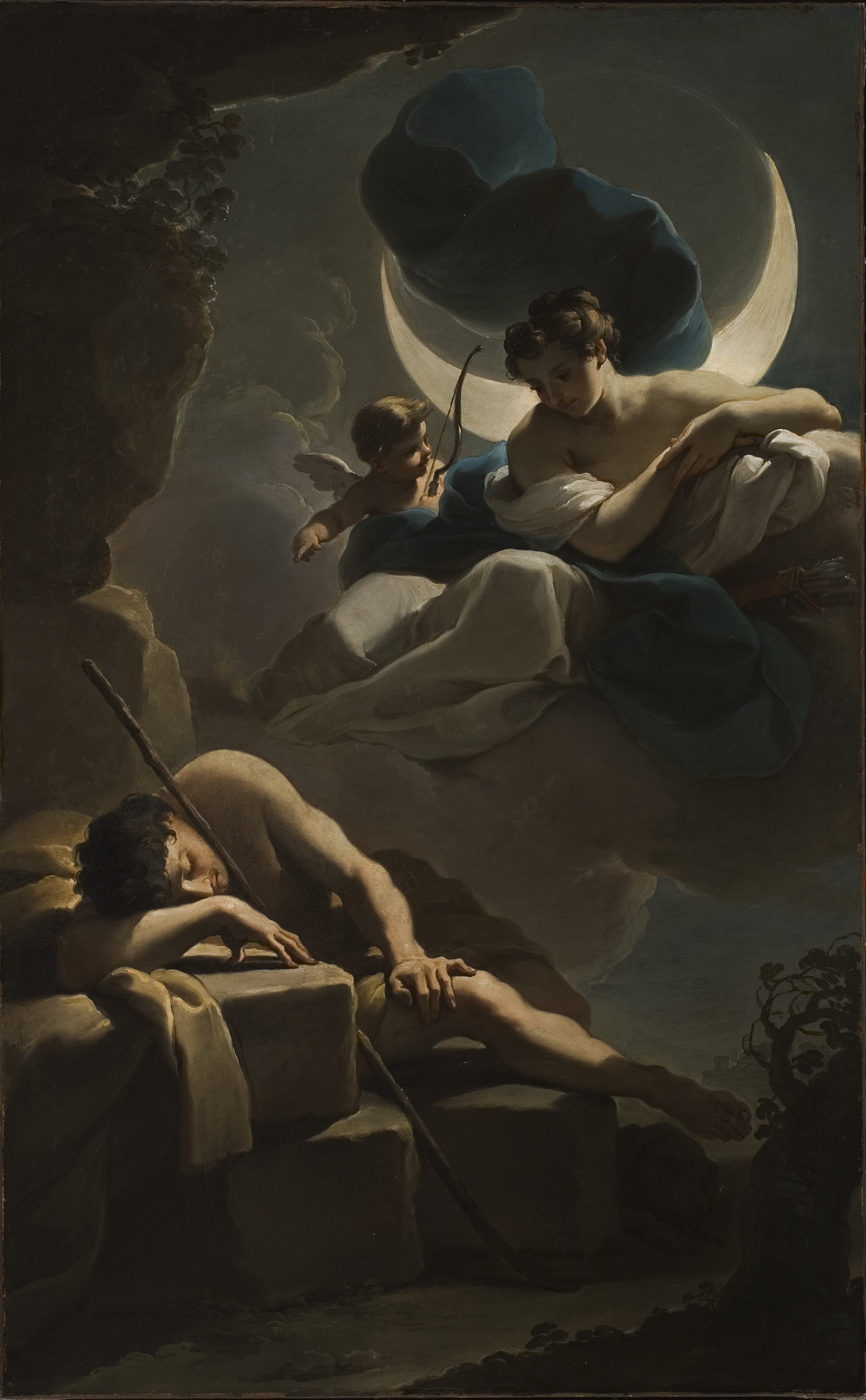
Selene and Endymion

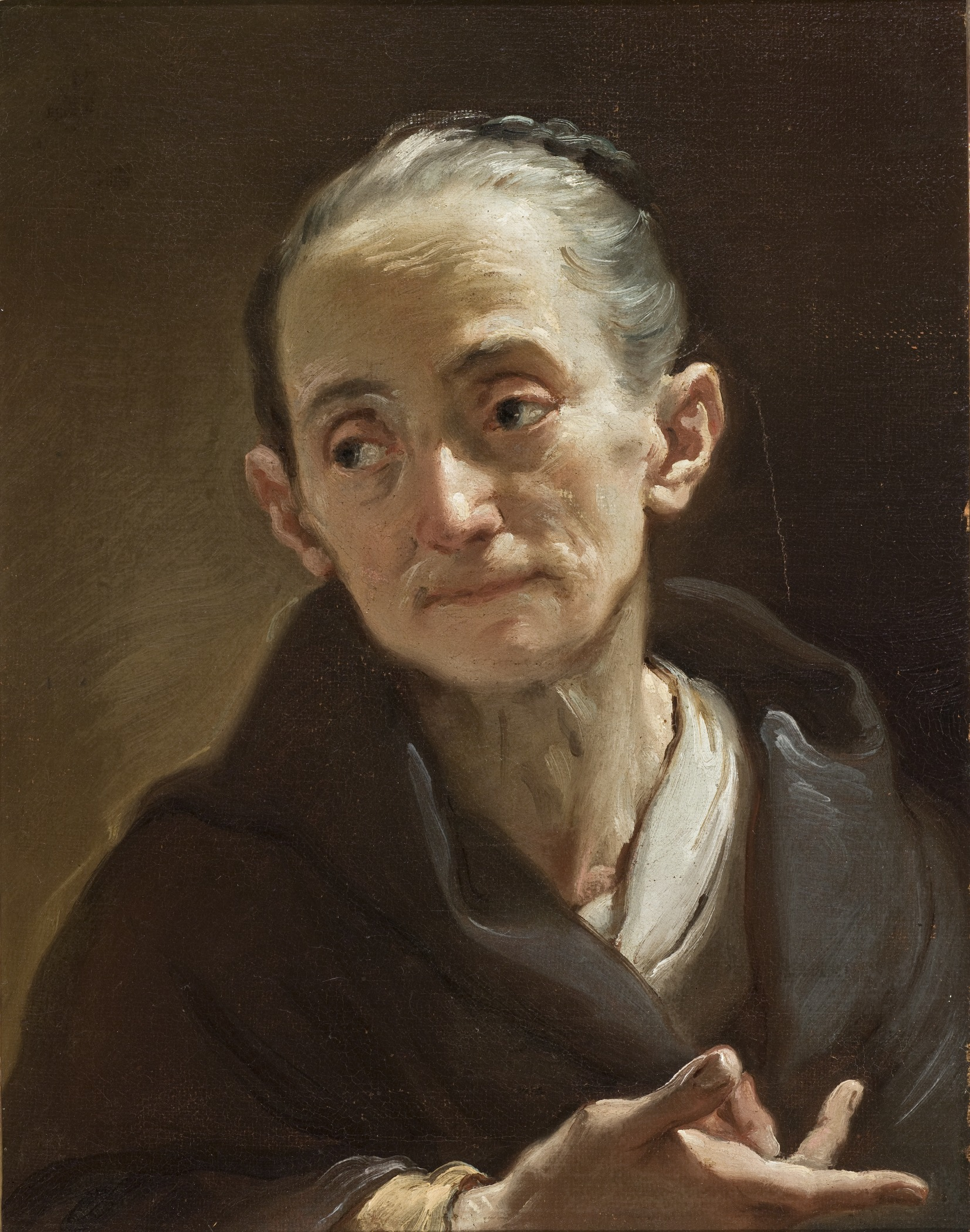
Head of an Old Woman

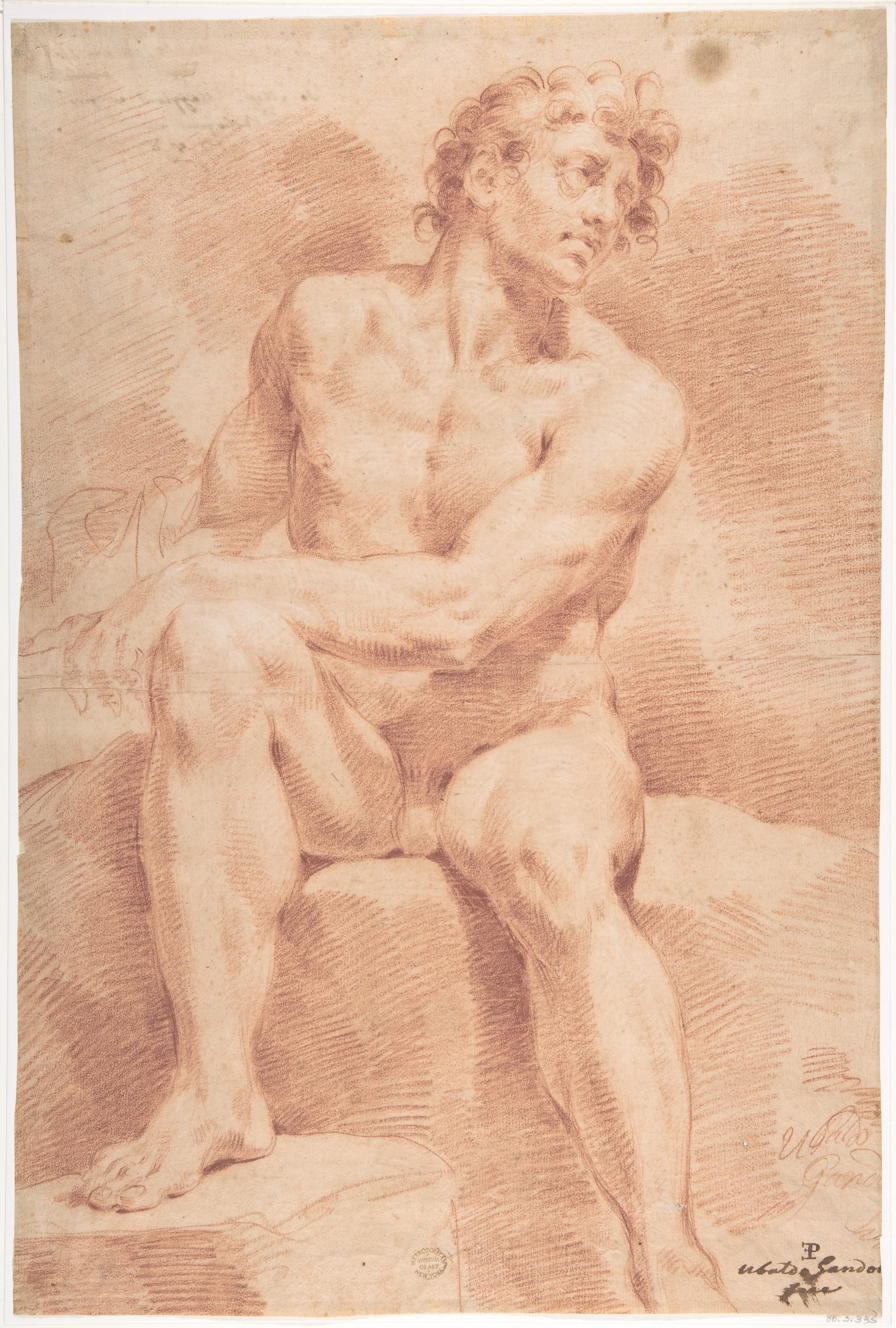
Seated Male Nude
