= Stefano Torelli =

Italian painter (1712–1784)

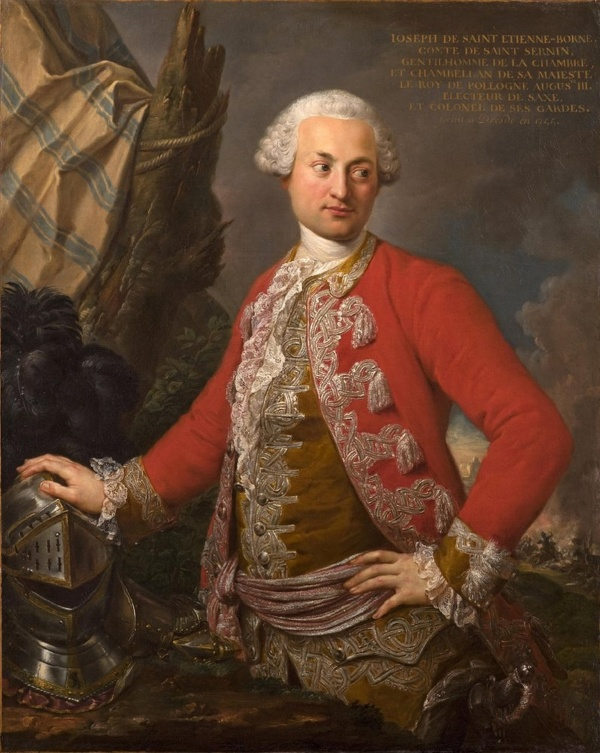
- Portrait of Joseph de Saint Étienne Borne, oil on canvas, 1755, Stair Sainty Gallery, London
- Born: 24 October 1704; Bologna, Papal States
- Died: 22 February 1780; Saint Petersburg, Russian Empire
- Known for: Painting
- Movement: Baroque

Stefano Torelli (24 October 1704 – 22 January 1780) was an Italian Baroque painter.

== Biography ==
Stefano Torelli was born in Bologna on 24 October 1704. He studied first under his father, Felice Torelli, and then under Francesco Solimena. According to Giampietro Zanotti, he executed an altarpiece, St. Ignatius of Loyola Driving out Demons from the Possessed, for the Jesuit church of Sant'Ignazio, Bologna, although it was removed because of a certain ‘suavity and elegance prejudicial to the purity of their noviciate’; the picture was then acquired by the Marchese Sanvitale at Parma. Zanotti further noted that Torelli moved to Venice, where he painted ‘in both fresco and oil with much honour’.

Luigi Crespi noted that by the time of his writing (the 1750s), Torelli was in Dresden, where he met Crespi in 1753. Torelli worked for the Elector Frederick-Augustus II, the future King of Poland, Augustus III, and executed altarpieces, ceiling paintings and portraits, many destroyed in the Seven Years' War. He painted figures in Canaletto's twenty-nine views of Dresden (1741). He then worked in Lübeck (1759–61) and Saint Petersburg, where he painted ceilings in the Winter Palace, and some portraits, among the latter one of the Empress Elizabeth in armor. In 1762 he was appointed Professor of the Imperial Academy of Arts. He was a clever caricaturist, and etched a few plates. He died in Saint Petersburg on 22 January 1780. His son Antonio Torelli was also a painter.

== Gallery ==
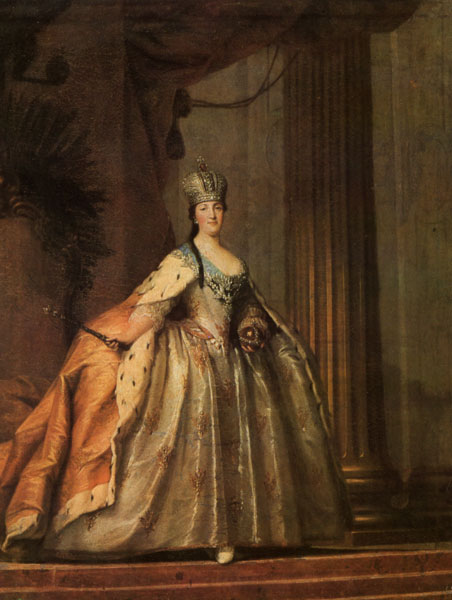
Portrait of Catherine II, c. 1760

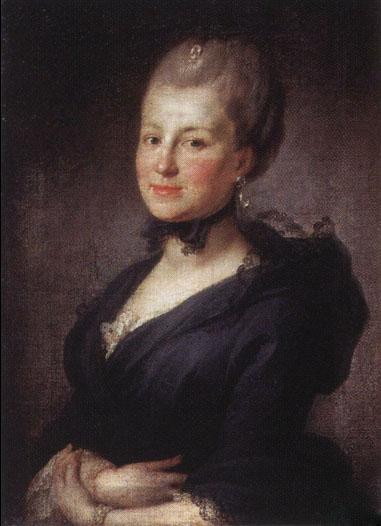
Anastasia Sokolova, wife of José de Ribas

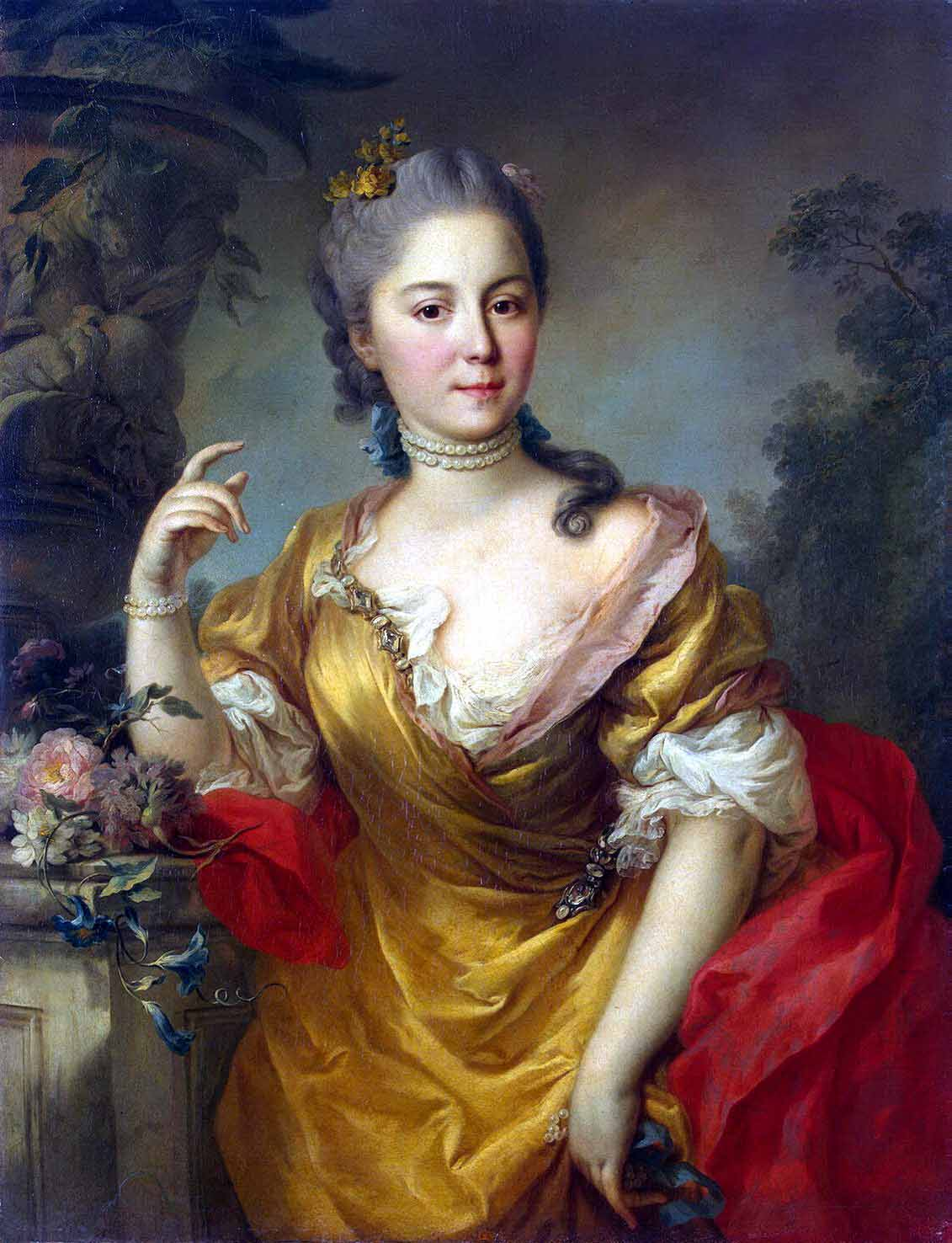
Anna Chernysheva

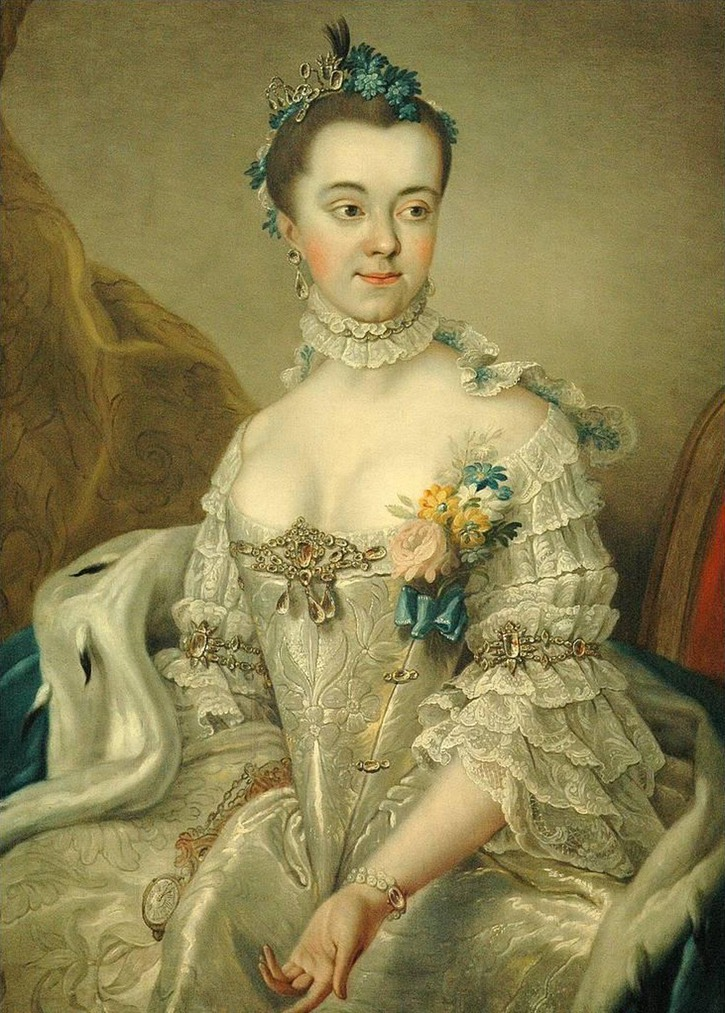
Charlotte Amalie

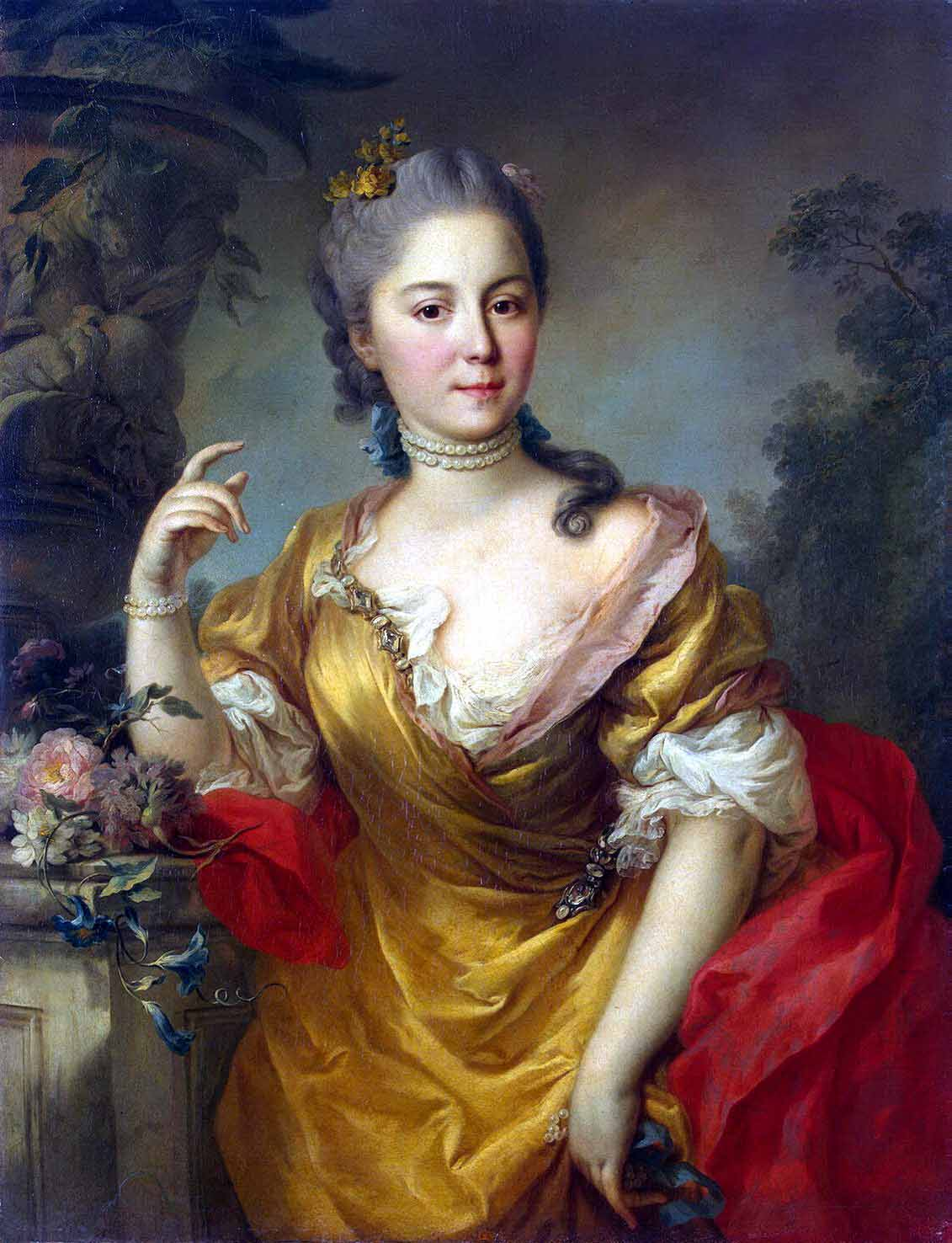
Anna Chernysheva, 1762

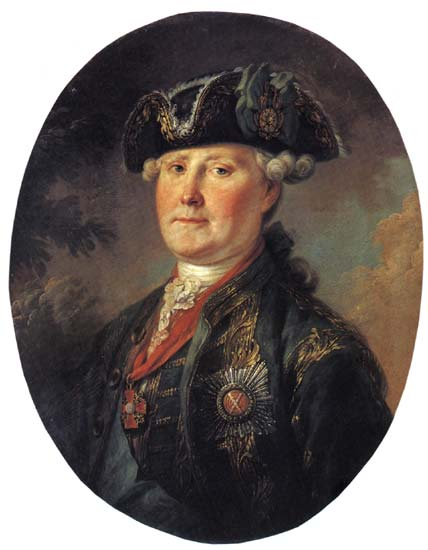
Semën Kirillovič Naryškin

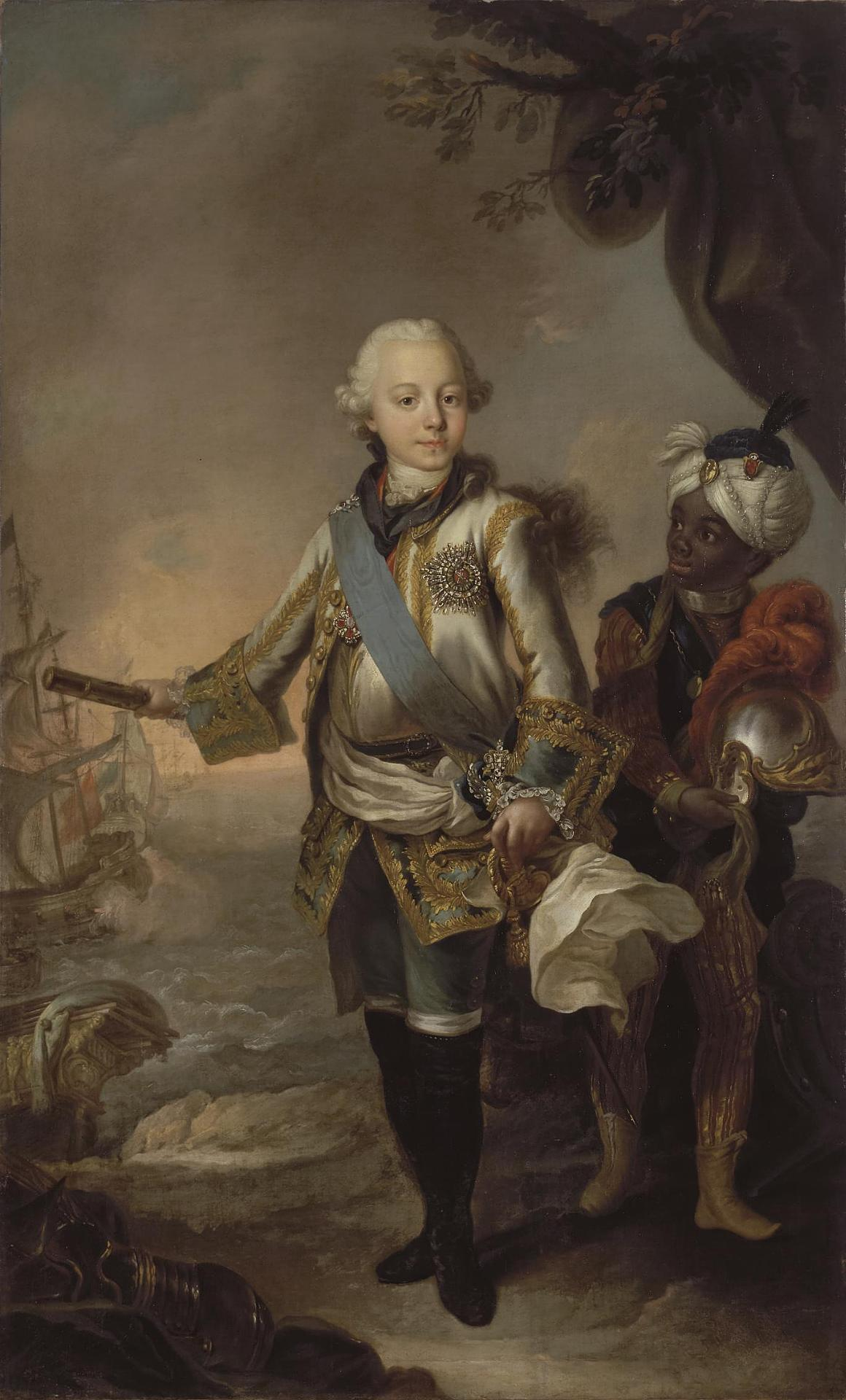
Grand Duke Pavel Petrovich

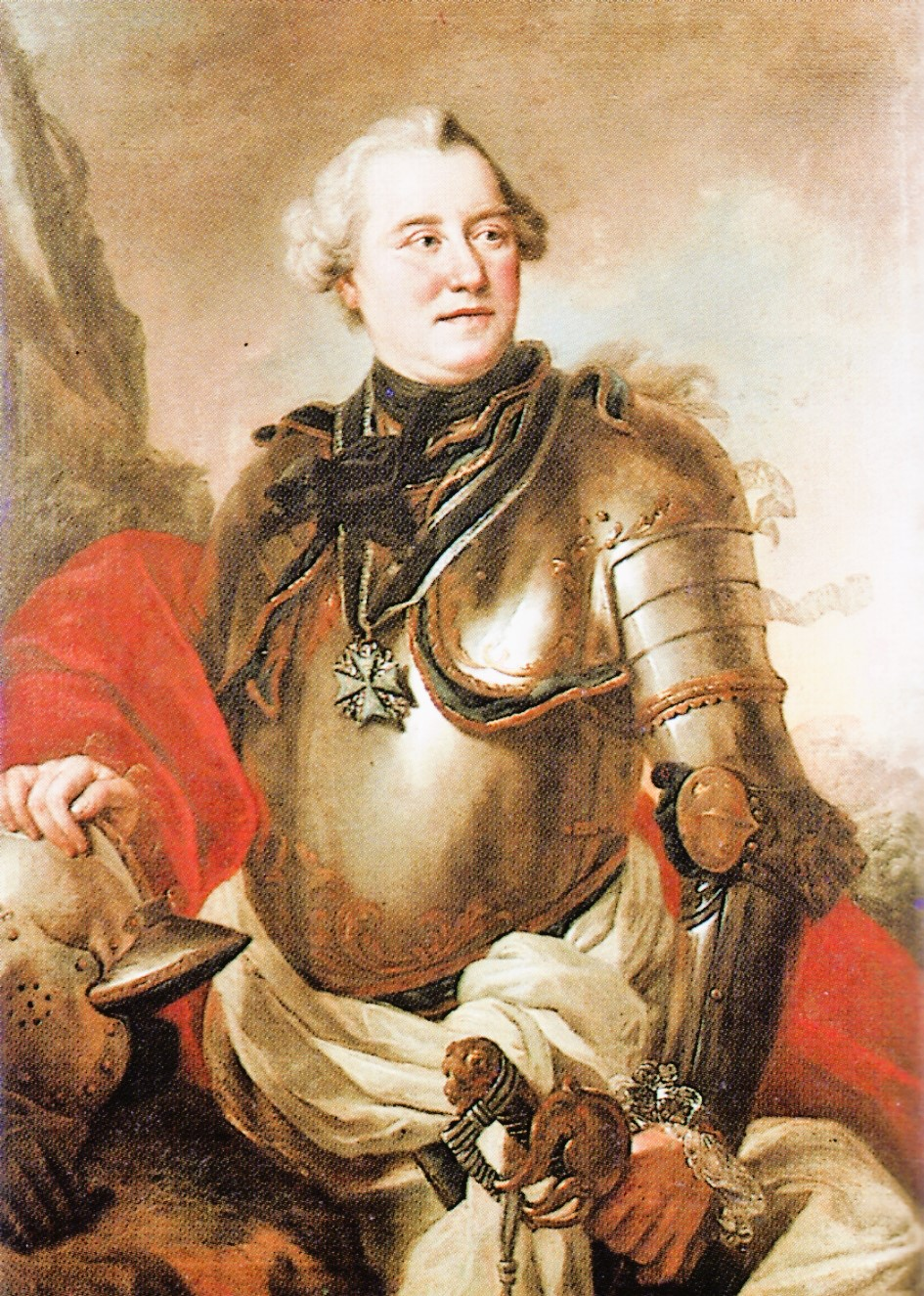
Egmont von Chasôt

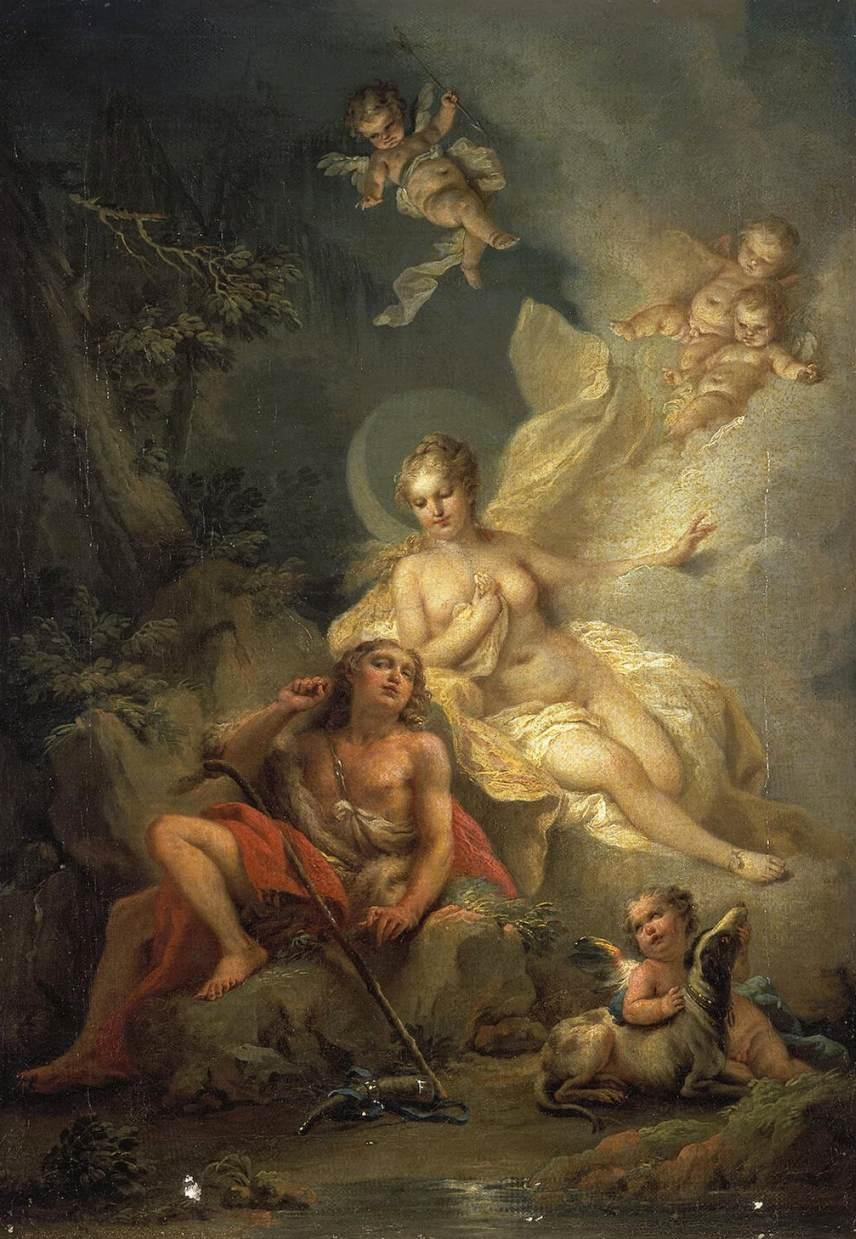
Diana and Endymion

== Bibliography ==
- Zanotti, Giampietro (1739). Storia dell’Accademia Clementina. Vol. 2. Bologna. pp. 75–88, 288.
- Crespi, Luigi (1769). Felsina pittrice: Vite de’ pittori bolognesi. Rome: Marco Pagliarini. pp. 243–5.
- Bryan, Michael (1889). Walter Armstrong; Robert Edmund Graves (eds.). Dictionary of Painters and Engravers, Biographical and Critical. Vol. II L-Z. London: George Bell and Sons. p. 580.
