= Gaetano Gandolfi =

Italian painter (1734–1802)

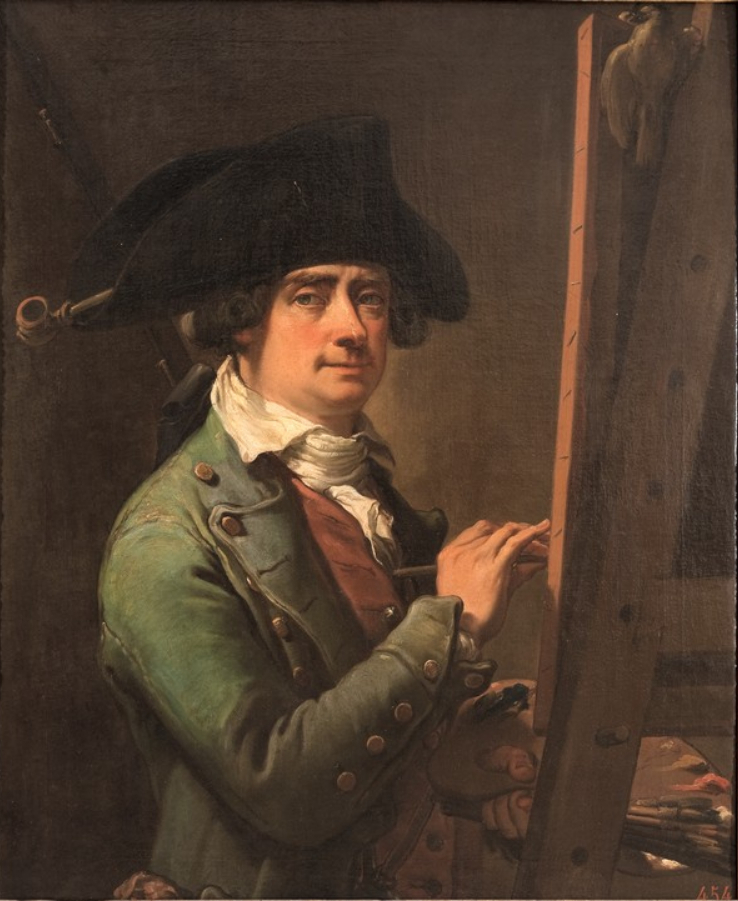
Self-portrait with easel (1780)

Gaetano Gandolfi (31 August 1734 – 20 June 1802) was an Italian painter, draughtsman and sculptor of the late Baroque period, mainly active in and around Bologna. He is known for his biblical, mythological and allegorical subjects, as well as his portraits and nudes. He was both a painter on canvas and a fresco painter. Gaetano and his older brother Ubaldo were among the leading artists in Italy during their lifetime. This reputation was earned by the excellent quality of their work, which lead to numerous major commissions from courts all over Europe.

== Career ==
Gaetano was born in San Matteo della Decima, near Bologna on an estate in the Po Valley that his father managed on behalf of a landowner. He followed in the footsteps of his older brother, Ubaldo, and enrolled at the Accademia Clementina in Bologna, where he won several prizes for portraiture and sculpture. The Gandolfi family produced a number of prominent artists, including Gaetano's older brother, Ubaldo and his sons Giovanni Battista and Ubaldo Lorenzo, as well as his own son Mauro and grandchildren Democrito (who was a pupil of Antonio Canova) and Clementina. The Gandolfi family are considered to be the last representatives of the grand manner of the Bolognese school of painting, which had established itself almost two centuries earlier with the group of painters trained by the Carracci.The Bolognese school of painting focused on realistic depictions of human anatomy and drawing from live models.

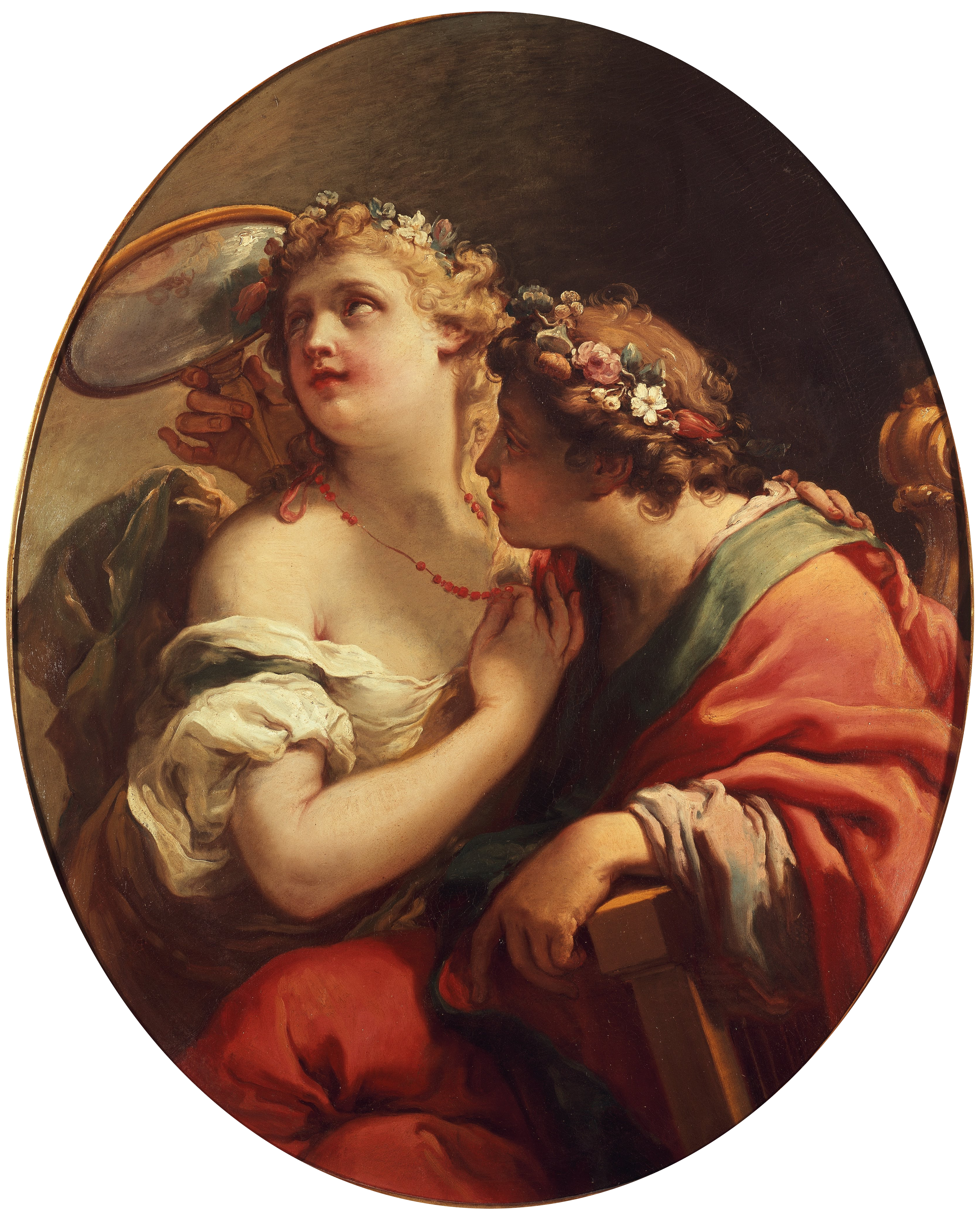
Allegory of Beauty

In his autobiography, Gaetano claimed Felice Torelli (1667–1748) as his master. Other sources mention Ercole Graziani the Younger (1688–1765) and Ercole Lelli. These masters instilled in Gaetano the importance of anatomical precision in his works. He travelled to England in 1788. Tiepolo and the original style of his older brother Ubaldo were important influences on his work. Later in his career, Gaetano's art became increasingly neoclassical. At this time, both stylistically and thematically, he seemed well acquainted with the work of Corrado Giaquinto and the artistic currents in France in the 1760s.

Gaetano died in Bologna, playing pétanque on the grounds of the church of Sant'Egidio, probably of a heart attack. There is another tradition which claims he was hit in the head by a bullet. Among his pupils was Serafino Viani from Reggio.

== Collections ==
Today, Gaetano's work is held in the permanent collections of several museums worldwide, including the Cooper Hewitt, the Detroit Institute of Arts, the Norton Museum of Art, the Snite Museum of Art, the University of Michigan Museum of Art, the British Museum, the LACMA, the Museum of Fine Arts, Budapest, the Toledo Museum of Art, the Victoria and Albert Museum, and the Clark Art Institute.

== Gallery ==
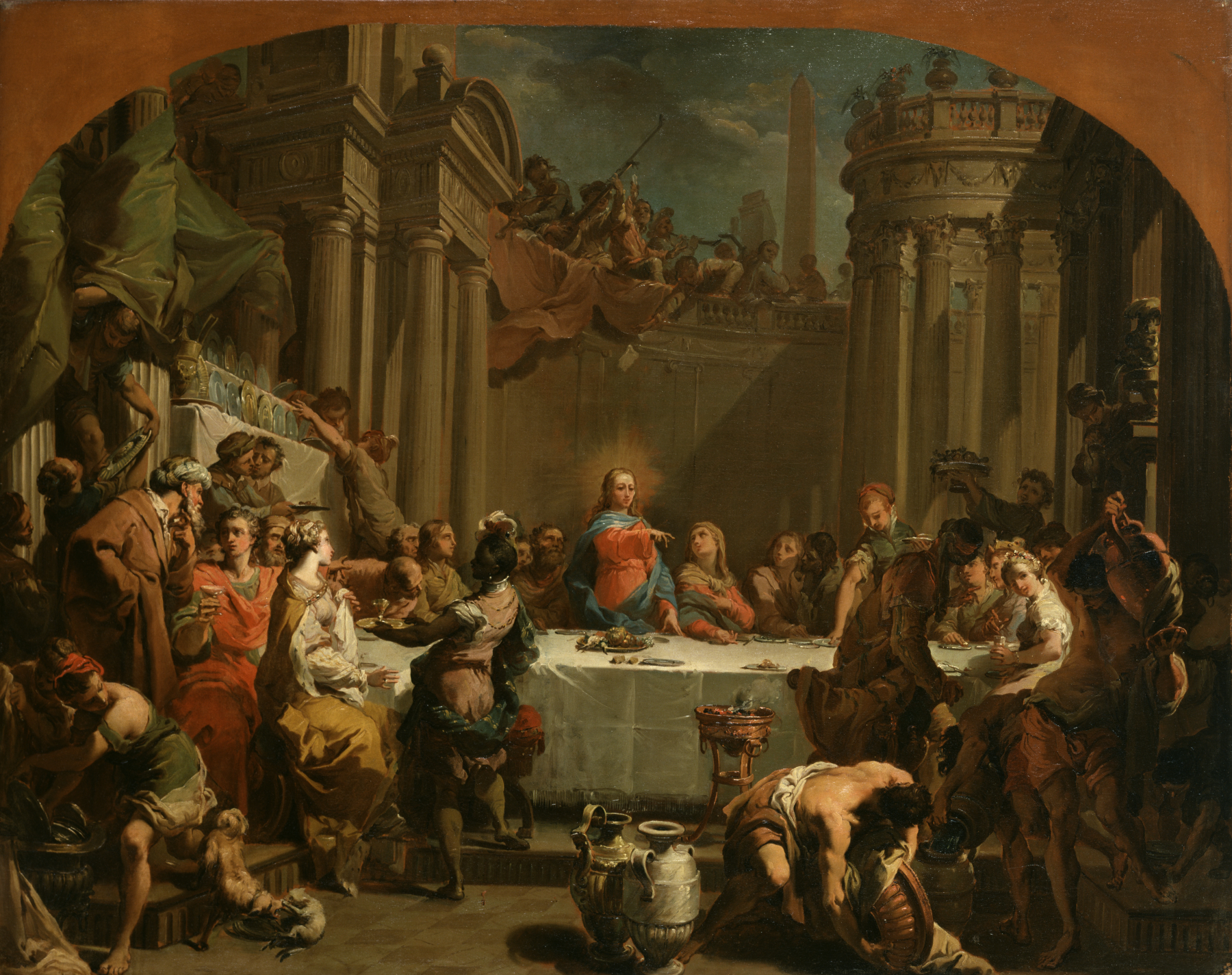
The Marriage at Cana, 1766, Walters Art Museum, Baltimore

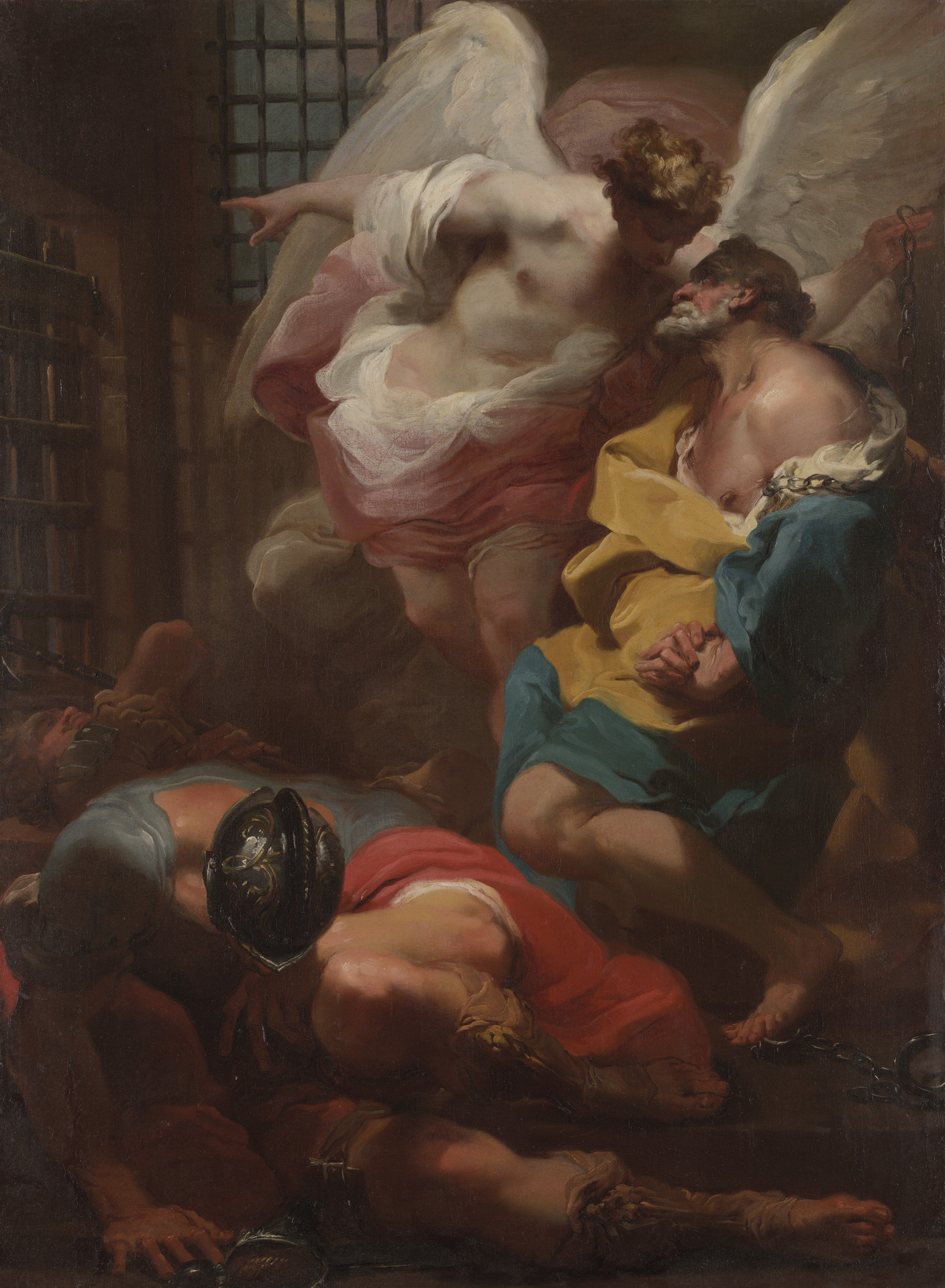
Liberation of St Peter, c. 1770, Yale University Art Gallery, New Haven

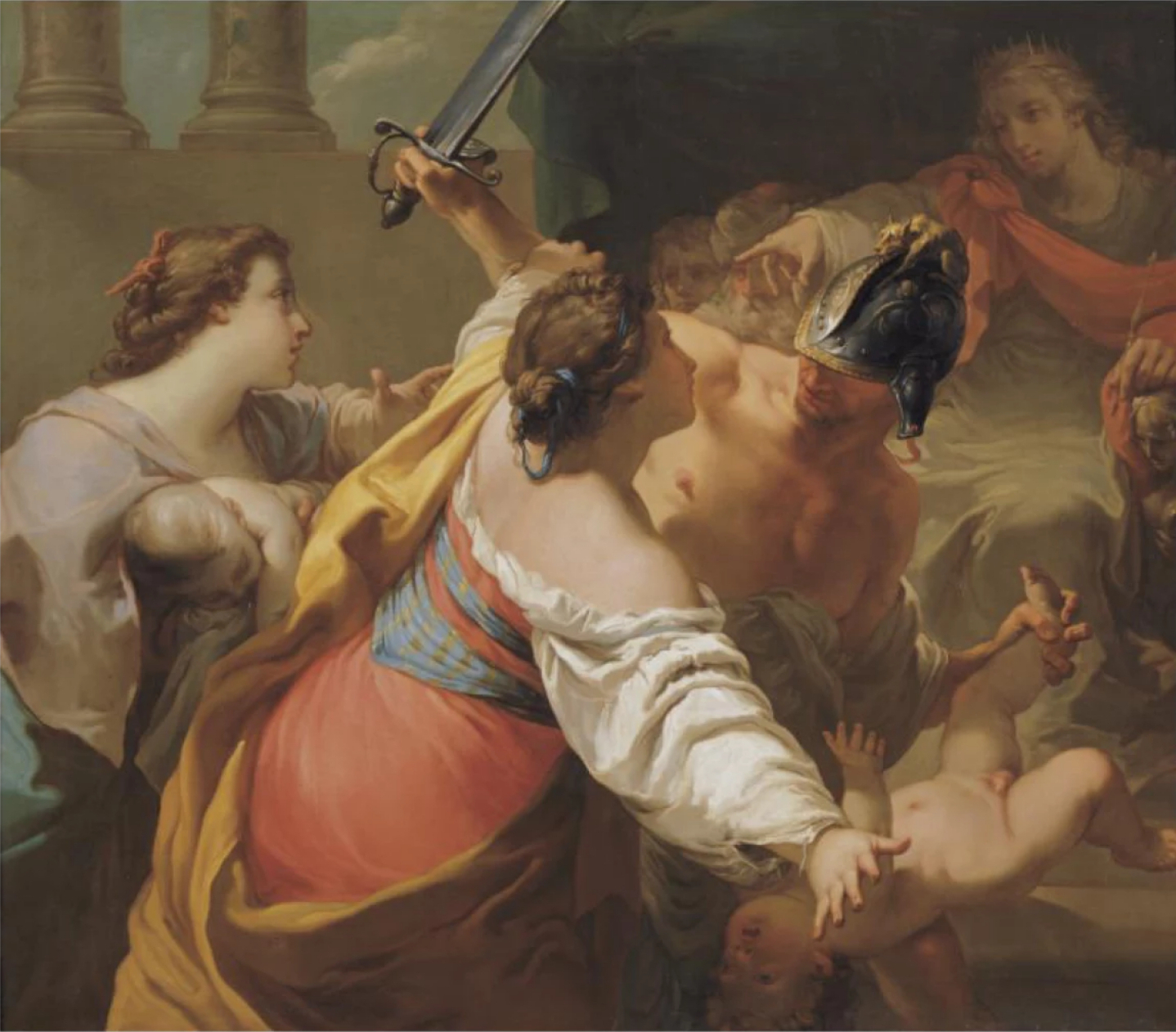
Judgement of Solomon, mid-1770s

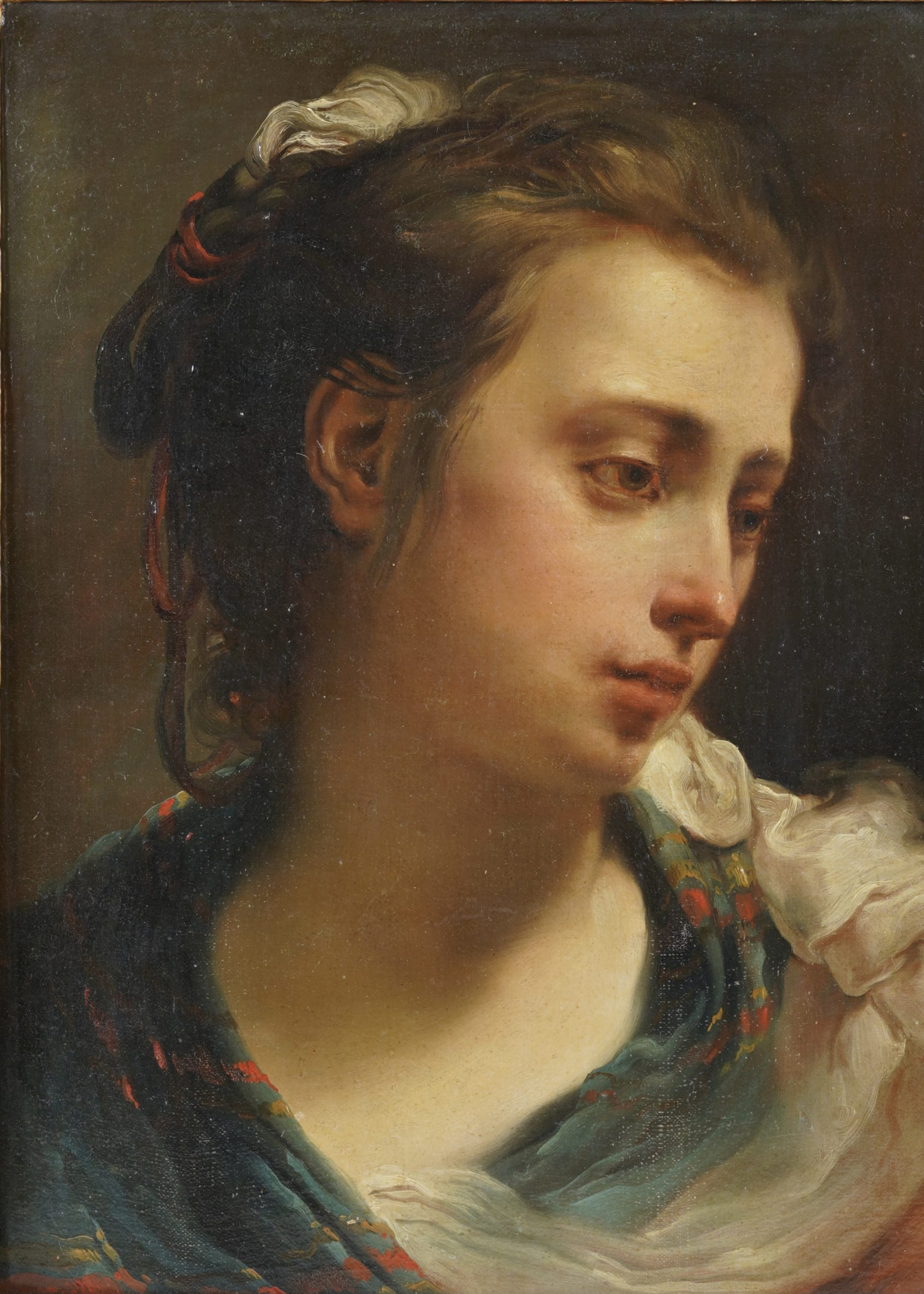
Bust portrait of a young woman with her hair up, 1777

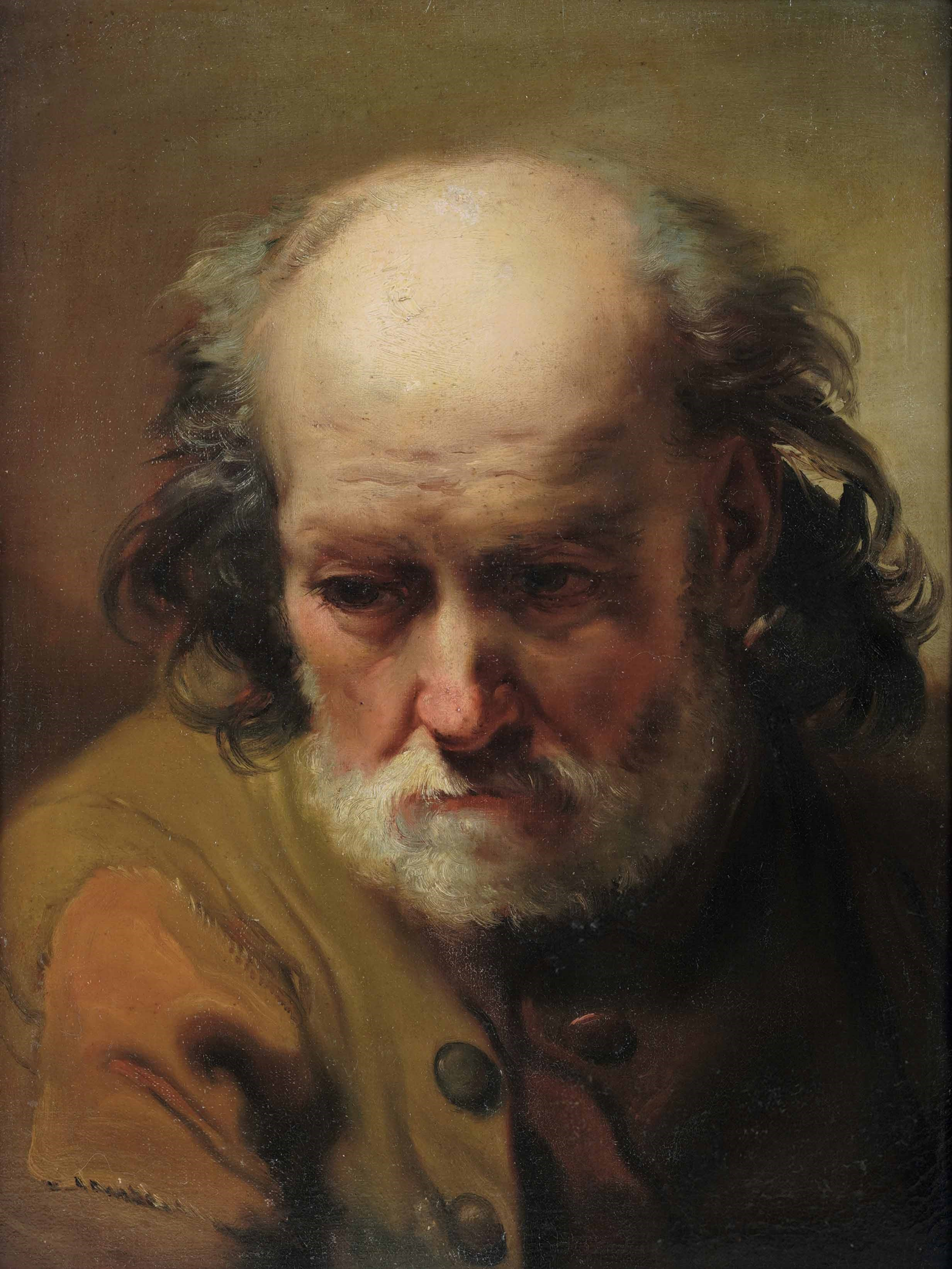
Bust of bearded old man with bowed head, 1777

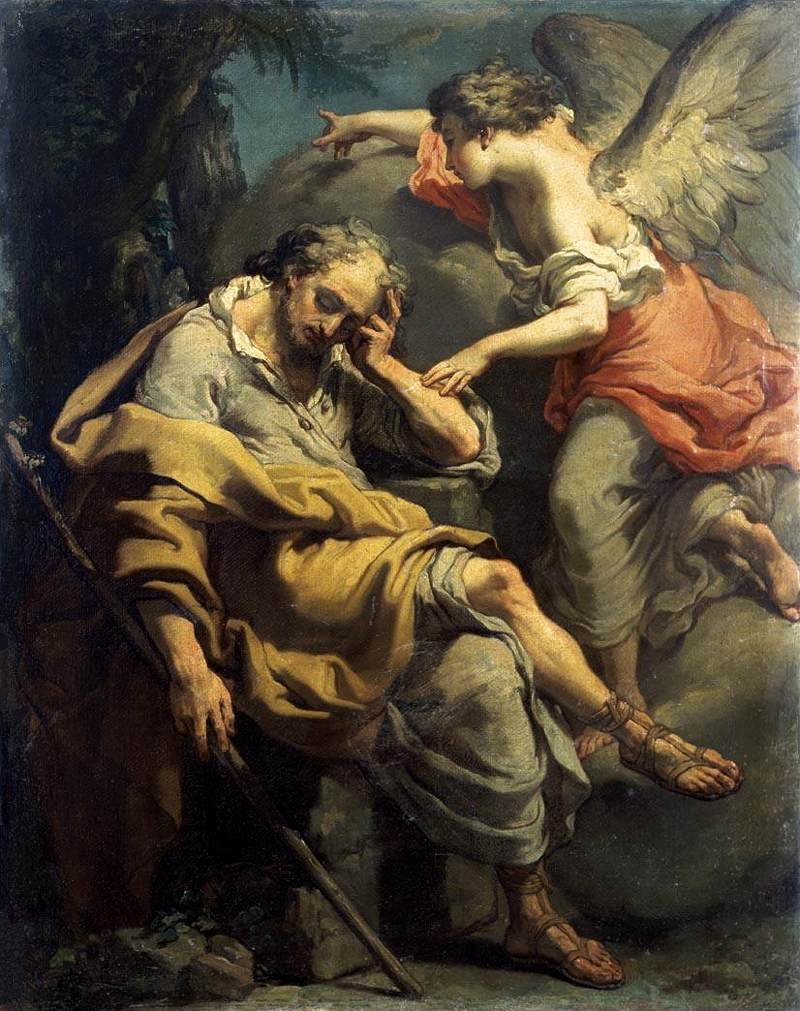
Joseph's Dream, c. 1790

Reclining Male Nude, 1750, Cleveland Museum of Art
