= Civic Tower =

Civic Tower may refer to:

- Civic Tower (Castel Goffredo), Italy
- Civic Tower (Pavia), Italy
- Civic Tower (Varese), Italy
- Civic Tower (Lagos), Nigeria
- Civic Tower (Portland, Oregon), United States
