= Loreti =

Loreti is a surname from the Latin Lauretum ("laurel grove"), derived from the term laurus, and therefore Loreto (Vulgar), plural Loreti. Notable people with this name include:

- Giovanni Battista Loreti (1686–1760), Italian painter
- Mario Loreti, Italian architect of the Civic Tower (Varese)
- Nicanor Loreti, Argentine filmwriter of Kryptonita
- Paola Loreti, Italian mathematician
- Robertino Loreti (born 1947), Italian singer
