= Cignani =

Cignani is a surname. Notable people with the surname include:

- Carlo Cignani (1628–1719), Italian painter
- Felice Cignani (1660–1724), Italian painter, son of Carlo
