= Zamboni (disambiguation) =

Zamboni is a genericized trademark name for an ice resurfacer.

Zamboni or The Zamboni may also refer to:

- Zamboni Company, a maker of ice resurfacers, founded by ice resurfacer inventor Frank Zamboni
- The Zamboni (magazine), a student-run humor publication at Tufts University
- Zamboni (surname)
- "Zamboni" (song), a 1990 song by Gear Daddies
- The Zambonis, a Connecticut-based indie rock band
- nickname of Ken Reitz (1951–2021), American Major League Baseball player

== See also ==
- Zamboni pile, an early electric battery
- Zamboni procedure, a procedure used in the treatment of chronic cerebrospinal venous insufficiency
