= Elisabetta Sirani =

Italian artist (1638–1665)

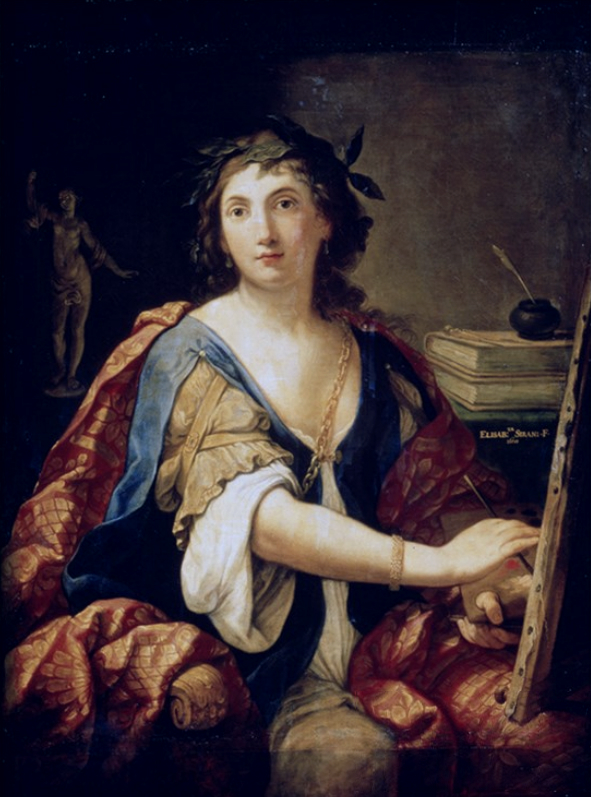
- Self-Portrait as Allegory of Painting (1658) by Elisabetta Sirani, Pushkin Museum, Moscow
- Born: 8 January 1638; Bologna, Papal States
- Died: 28 August 1665 (aged 27); Bologna, Papal States
- Education: Family
- Known for: Painting
- Movement: Baroque

Elisabetta Sirani (8 January 1638 – 28 August 1665) was an Italian Baroque painter and printmaker who died in unexplained circumstances at the age of 27. She was one of the first women artists in early modern Bologna. She became a successful painter, producing public altarpieces as well as privately commissioned pictures.

== Life ==
Elisabetta Sirani was born in Bologna on 8 January 1638, the first of four children of Margherita and Giovanni Andrea Sirani. Giovanni was an art merchant and painter of the School of Bologna, having been a favorite assistant of Guido Reni. He did not produce many works during his lifetime; instead, he took over Reni's job as a teacher, and became the master in the first life school held in the house of Ettore Ghislieri.

Sirani first trained as a painter in her father's studio. There is evidence that Giovanni was not inclined at first to have his daughter as a pupil, but she picked up his technique nonetheless and became one of the most renowned painters in Bologna. The art biographer Carlo Cesare Malvasia, a personal acquaintance of the Sirani family, claimed credit for recognizing Elisabetta's talent and persuading her father to train her as a painter, although this was likely self-aggrandizing.

Sirani's biography is included in Malvasia's two-volume Felsina pittrice: vite de’pittori bolognesi, or Lives of the Bolognese Painters, first published in 1678. She is presented therein as the epitome of Bolognese genius, and Malvasia takes much pride in his (alleged) contribution to her early career. Throughout, he praises the originality of her compositions, her style of drawing, her fast manner of working and her professionalism, contrasting her with Lavinia Fontana, an earlier Bolognese woman painter whom he describes as timid.

In establishing her painting style, Sirani studied the works of Annibale Carracci, Lorenzo Pasinelli, Desubleo, Simone Cantarini, and Cignani. Along with technique, her early education included outlines of Bible history and the legends of saints, as well as Classical mythology. Sirani received her first commission in her teens, a Baptism of Christ, which was a companion piece to an earlier painting by her father at the Campo Santo of Bologna. She was also knowledgeable in music, perhaps because her brother-in-law was a musician.

According to some scholars, Sirani's artistic reputation soon overshadowed that of both her father and her two sisters, who were also painters. By 1654, Giovanni Andrea Sirani became incapacitated by gout, so Elisabetta began running her family's workshop. At this point, she was the household's primary breadwinner, supporting the family with her teaching fees and portrait commissions. Her studio was highly successful, partially due to the progressive atmosphere of Bologna, where women artists were accepted and celebrated.

== Death ==
Sirani died suddenly in August 1665, in Bologna. Her death was considered suspicious and a maidservant, Lucia Tolomelli, was charged with poisoning the artist and put on trial. Suspicion fell on Tolomelli because she had requested to end her service to the family only days before Sirani's death. Giovanni Andrea Sirani withdrew the charges soon after the trial. Laura Ragg comments that Sirani died at "an age regarded as young indeed for death, but hopelessly late for marriage." Malvasia attributed her death to love-sickness because Sirani never married. Her actual cause of death was most likely the onset of peritonitis after a ruptured peptic ulcer. This may have been the result of the intense stress she was submitted to after she was charged with providing for her entire household.

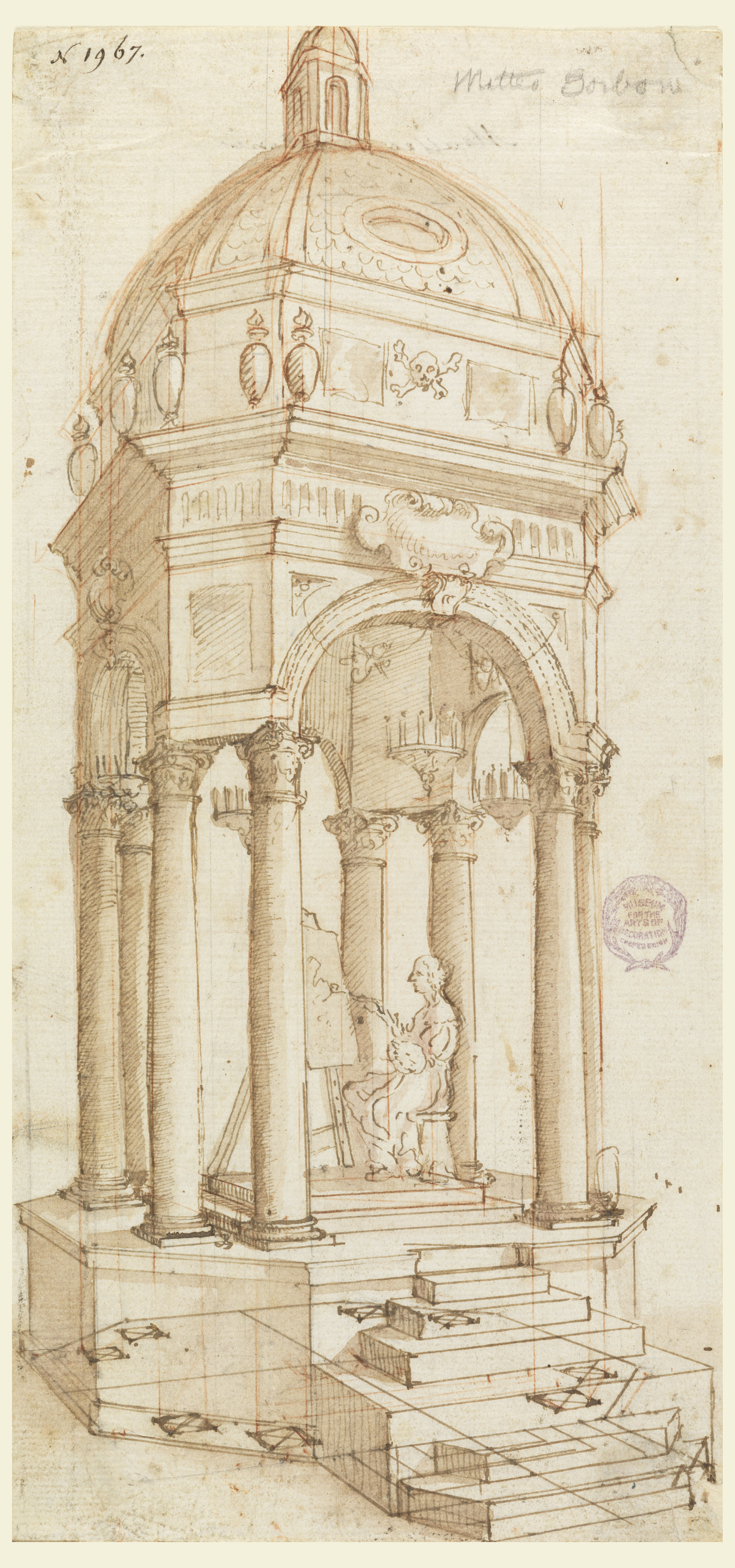
Catafalque of Elisabetta Sirani, 1665

Sirani was given an elaborate funeral which included an enormous catafalque with a life-sized sculpture of the artist (illustrated in Malvasia's biography), orations and music composed in her honor by Bologna's most prominent citizens, and she was buried in the Basilica of San Domenico, Bologna, in the same tomb as her father's teacher, Guido Reni. Sirani's public funeral is regarded by some, including Laura Ragg, as a eulogy to Bologna, the city that gave birth to Sirani, considered a precocious and prolific artist by her contemporaries. Sirani was described by a poet as the Lamented Paintbrush. Malvasia suggests that it was not poisoning but a condition that arose spontaneously in the body of a “vivacious and spirited woman, concealing to the highest degree her craving for a perhaps coveted husband denied to her by her father.” A city official at the time wrote that “She is mourned by all. The ladies especially whose portraits she flattered, cannot hold their peace about it. Indeed it is a great misfortune to lose such great artist in so strange a manner.” The ostentatious and elaborate funeral she received reflects the high esteem she was held in by her contemporaries and indeed her international fame.

== Pupils ==
Not only was Elisabetta Sirani the successor of her father's workshop, she was also a great teacher of many, especially contributing to women artists’ development during the Renaissance period. She trained a number of men and women artists, including her younger sisters Barbara and Anna Maria and at least twelve other young women at the school she set up. This became the first school of painting for women in Europe outside of a convent, and it was inclusive regardless of the women's artistic and social connections.

Some of her pupils included Veronica Fontana, later known throughout Italy as a first-rate wood-engraver; Caterina Pepoli and Maria Elena Panzacchi, who also had art careers in Bologna; Camelia Lanteri and Lucretia Forni, who specialized in large-scale religious paintings; and Veronica Franchi, whose predilection was for mythological subjects. Lucrezia Scarfaglia was another pupil. Lastly, there was Ginevra Cantofoli, represented during her career as Sirani's enemy and rival.

== Works ==
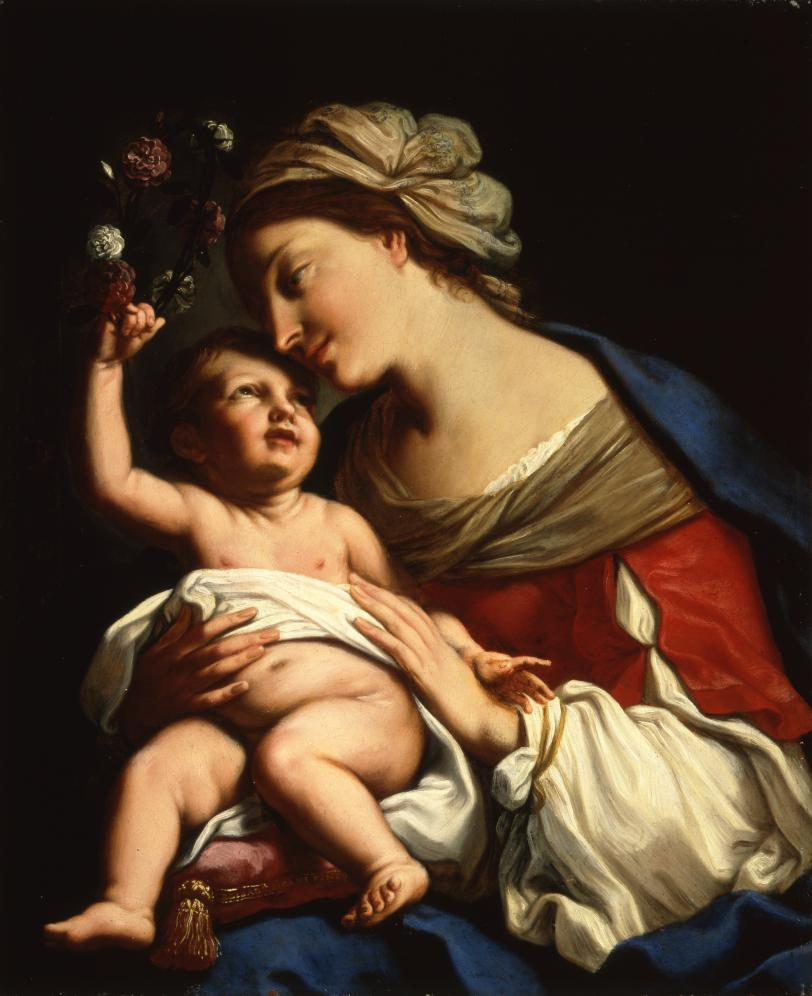
Virgin and Child, 1663 at National Museum of Women in the Arts, Washington, D.C.

Sirani produced over 200 paintings, 15 etchings, and hundreds of drawings, making her an extremely prolific artist, especially considering her early death. Of these hundreds of drawings, about a quarter relate to known paints or prints done by Sirani. Sirani kept a meticulous list and records of her paintings and who commissioned them beginning in 1655, which is recorded in Malvasia's biography. Additionally many of her paintings are signed, which was not a common practice among her male counterparts. It's possible that she chose to do this in order to avoid her work being confused with that of her father. Her signature also offered a way to further prove her powers of invention, which, according to Ann Sutherland Harris, distinguished her from other Italian women artists. Sirani's exceptional productivity was the result of how quickly she painted. She painted so many works that many doubted that she painted them all herself. To refute such charges she invited her accusers on 13 May 1664 to watch her paint a portrait in one sitting.

Her works cover a number of subjects, including historical and Biblical narratives, allegories, and portraits, all of which often featured women. Sirani was the first female artist in Bologna to specialize in history painting, and many of the women painters that Sirani trained followed suit. Sirani's specialization in history painting is very different than other female painters of the time, who usually only painted still lifes. She received her first major public commission on February 28, 1657 at the age of nineteen in Bologna, from Daniele Granchi, prior of the Carthusian church of Certosa di Bologna.

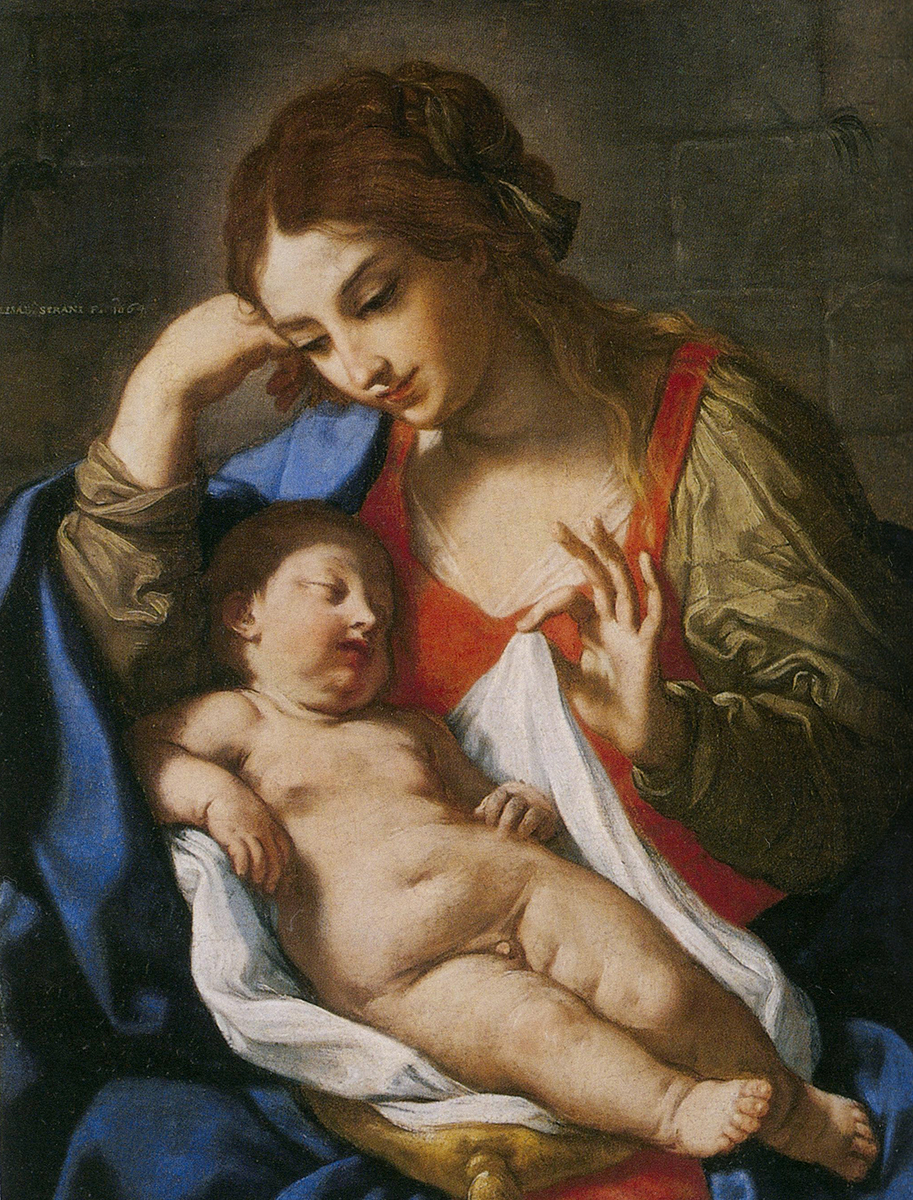
The Madonna Contemplating the Baby Jesus, oil on canvas, 85 x 69 cm, 1664

She painted at least 13 public altarpieces, including The Baptism of Christ at the Certosa di Bologna of 1658. Around 1660, she began focusing extensively on small-scale devotional images, particularly the Virgin and Child and Holy Family, which were enormously popular with private collectors. Her patrons ranged from cardinals to kings, princes, dukes, merchants, and academics from Bologna and across Europe. Sirani became a celebrity in her city as visitors, such as diplomats, political leaders, and noblemen, would come to her studio to watch her work.

Sirani's style is close to that of her father's teacher, Guido Reni, but Sirani employed more dramatic contrasts of light and shade, virtuoso brushstrokes, and more brilliant color. More similarities of her works may be found in the draftsmanship of Ludovico Carracci, Giovanni Francesco Barbieri (Guercino), and Simone Cantarini (Bohn). Her striking images of female heroines, such as Portia Wounding Her Thigh are comparable to the work of Artemisia Gentileschi. Sirani often selected lesser-known subjects for her paintings and her unique interpretation of iconography drew praise from a number of contemporaries. As Bohn notes, “Sirani made drawings in a variety of media, such as brush and wash, pen and ink with wash, black chalk, red chalk, and a combination of the two.” Her drawings, while done in many different media, were usually in pen or brush and ink and display the same brilliance as her paintings, often quickly executed with what Malvasia describes as "nonchalance."

Sirani managed to thwart visual gender conventions in which portraiture was the expected genre for female artists. Instead, she transformed the format into an allegorical mode that solicits the observer's interpretation of the work. Sirani based many of her allegories on Cesare Ripa's descriptions from his Iconologia, published in 1611. Some of her favored topics included Greek and Roman mythology, mythological figures, and the poetry of Horace.

Male nudity was not often attempted by female artists of the time as they did not wish to display their lack of experience from life-drawing (a practice which was typically withheld from them). They were aware of the prurient effect that the inclusion of such subject matter may have on their reputations. If the male nude was depicted it was usually done in a religious context, for example many depictions of Jesus Christ. Another example is the composition of Ten Thousand Crucified Martyrs' which is replete with male nude figures. While it does fall under this religious category of the male nude, Sirani's work displays a strong sense of individuality.

=== Judith and Holofernes, c. 1660s ===
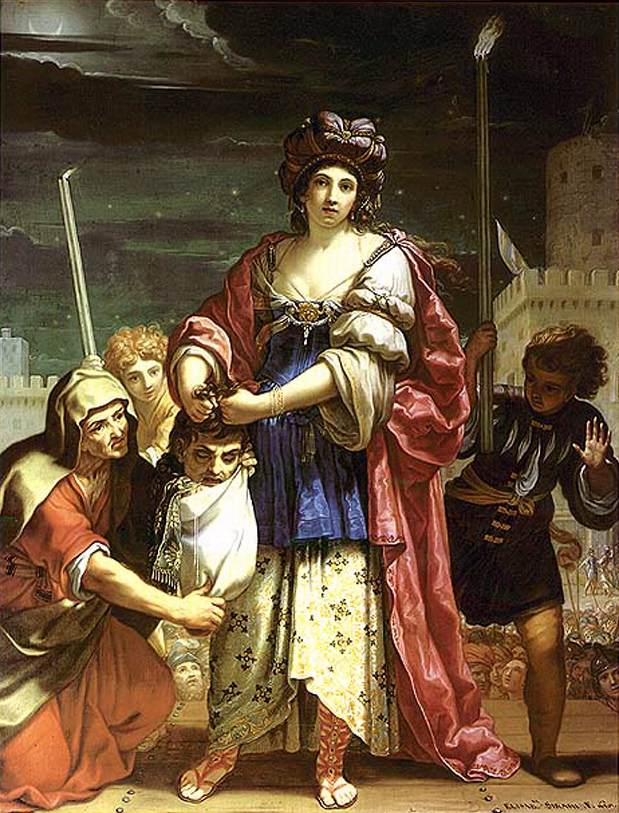
Judith with the Head of Holofernes

The subject of Judith is a popular one for female artists of the seventeenth century, and even before and after. The number of women completing and studying history paintings increased at this time. This was especially prevalent for those who had fathers who exclusively studied history painting, or mostly this topic. Elisabetta Sirani was no exception, as her father studied and taught history painting. In Sirani's rendition, Judith is the apex figure, creating a classical, triangular composition reminiscent of the Renaissance. Judith's handmaiden is old and decrepit, aiding Judith with carrying the head of Holofernes. Sirani portrays Judith in the nighttime, succumbing to the viewer with her act of murder. This painting has been compared to Gentileschi's Judith Slaying Holofernes from 1620, which has often been regarded as violent. Both represent Judith as a strong figure, though Sirani's hierarchically reaches the top of the picture plane. Whereas Gentileschi portrays the handmaiden in total collusion with Judith, Sirani depicts a less active handmaiden, emphasizing the forcefulness of Judith in this way.

In other renditions of Judith and Holofernes by Sirani, Judith is still cool and mild-mannered. Her fierceness lies in the action of slaying Holofernes, rather than in her face or movements within the composition. In each of Sirani's versions, Judith does not look at the severed head of Holofernes. Rather than being decisive and involved, as Gentileschi's Judiths are, she is rather a beautiful woman to be regarded and appraised. This fact and comparison to Gentileschi proves that the underlying female-ness of the paintings have nothing in common other than the fact that they were both created by women. Feminist art historians have observed this as an example of how women artists stand on their own and distinguish themselves from each other.

=== St. Anthony of Padua, 1662 ===
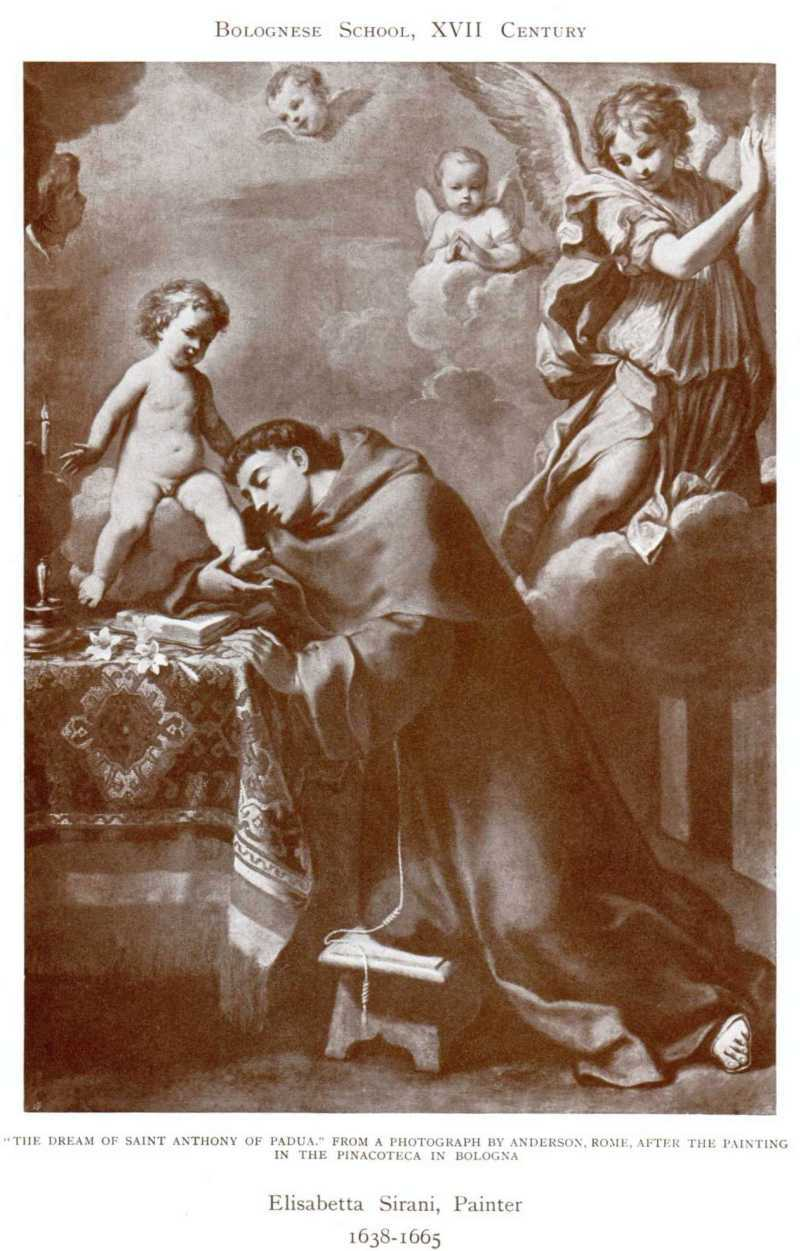
St. Anthony of Padua, 1662, Pinocoteca, Bologna, Italy

This painting is hung in the Pinacoteca in Bologna near the work of Guido Reni. The young saint, who is normally portrayed as an ascetic dreamer, is seen here kneeling as a lover of children. The celestial children are painted with an essence of earthly delight that some scholars regard as never been done before. The composition reveals a diagonal thrust that contrasts greatly with the other paintings in the same gallery. It was commissioned by Giovanni Battista Cremonese, a jeweler.

=== Portia Wounding Her Thigh, 1664 ===
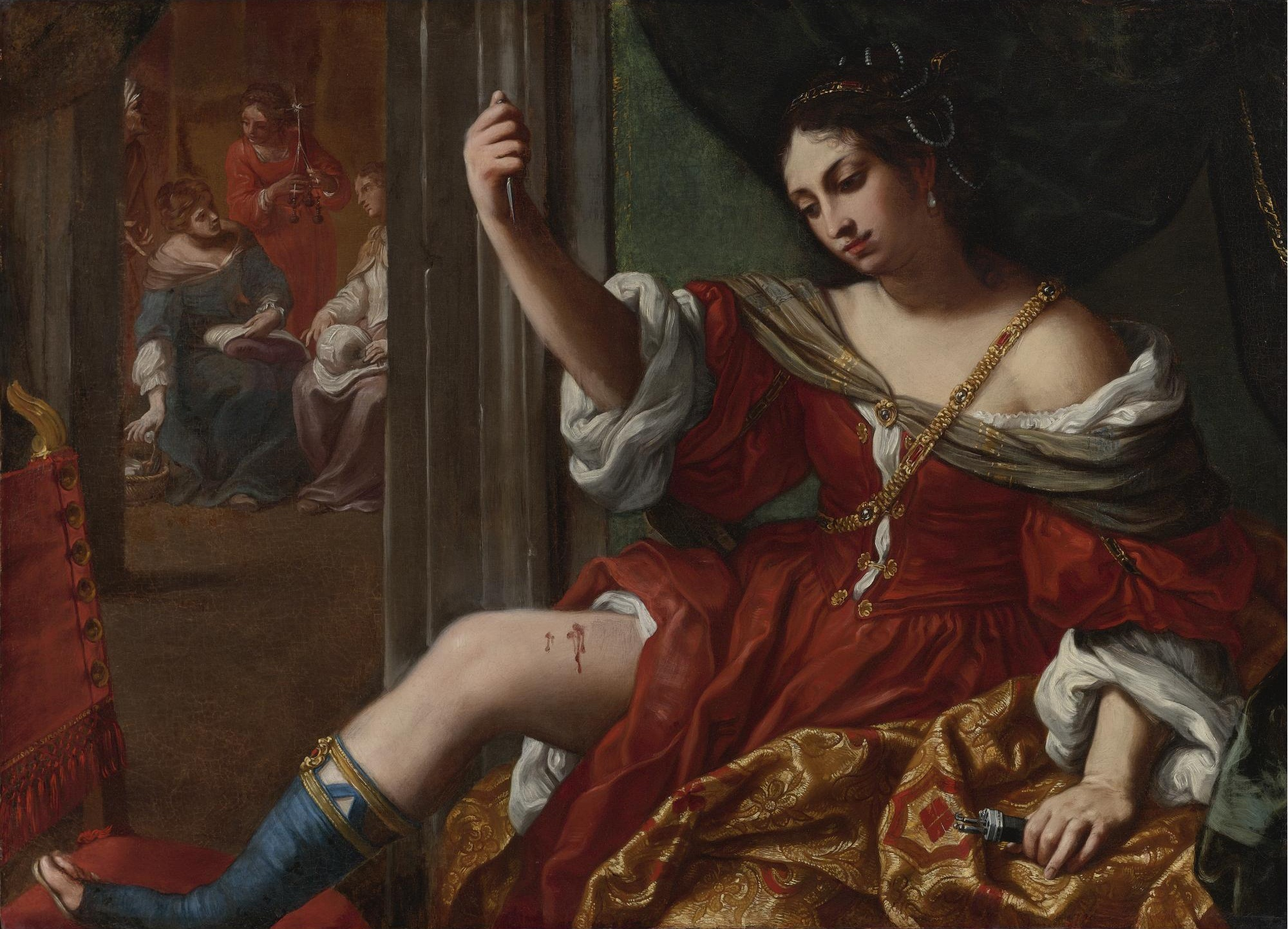
Portia Wounding Her Thigh, 1664 at Collezioni d'Arte e di Storia della Fondazione Carisbo, Bologna

This 1664 painting of Portia depicts her in the act of wounding her own thigh. The act is described in Plutarch’s lives as a “trial of herself” that would prove her trustworthiness to her husband Brutus. Sirani’s Portia makes up a majority of the picture plane, only leaving space in the far left to frame her three female attendants weaving silk. In contrast to their gendered craft, Portia elevates her leg on a velvet covered chair and reveals three puncture wounds already self inflicted with her skirt hiked out of the way. Her right arm is raised, and she holds a small knife, ready to cause a fourth puncture. She is adorned in gold jewelry and pearls, complementing the sumptuous jewel-toned fabrics that make up her 17th century style dress and surroundings. The visual emphasis on the skillfully painted fabrics through detailed pattern work and folds is thought to be to appeal to the person who commissioned it: Simone Tassi, a Bolognese fabric merchant.

Modern scholarship of this work focuses on how the specific figures and scenes Sirani picks to paint differs from male history painters of her time. The more popular depiction of Portia is during the act of her suicide, when she swallows hot coals after going mad from grief over her husband’s absence and the political state of Rome. One such depiction is by Guido Reni, with whom Sirani was heavily associated during her lifetime. In this work, he paints a reclining Portia reaching languidly for the hot coal with her left breast exposed, creating a salacious tone not present in the source material. In contrast, Sirani paints Portia in a moment of uniquely feminine heroism, centering her intention to prove she can take on the emotional labor of Brutus’ secrets by enduring physical pain. Sirani's painting thus provides a view of an heroine’s trial rather than an eroticized martyr.

== In popular culture ==
Sirani is referenced in Judy Chicago's The Dinner Party.

In 1994, a crater on the planet Venus was named after Sirani.

Sirani's painting Virgin and Child of 1663, now in the collection of the National Museum of Women in the Arts in Washington, D.C., was selected for the United States Postal Service Christmas Holiday Stamp series in October 1994. This was the first work by a woman artist chosen for the series.

Her Herodias with the Head of John the Baptist is featured on the cover of the Canadian technical death metal band Cryptopsy's 1996 album None So Vile.

== Gallery ==
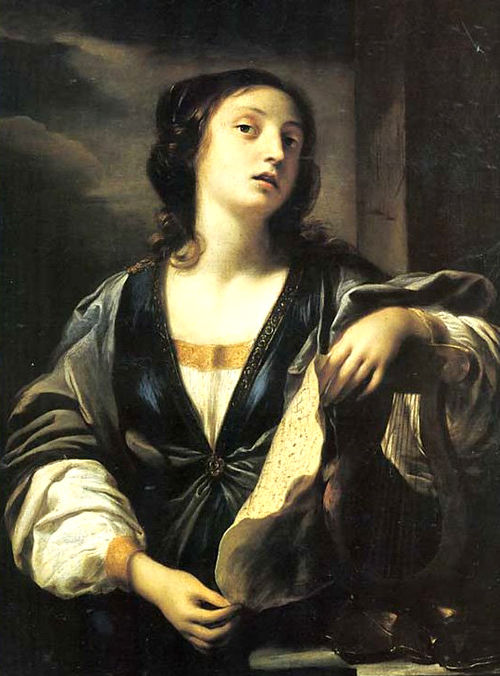
Allegory of Music, 1659

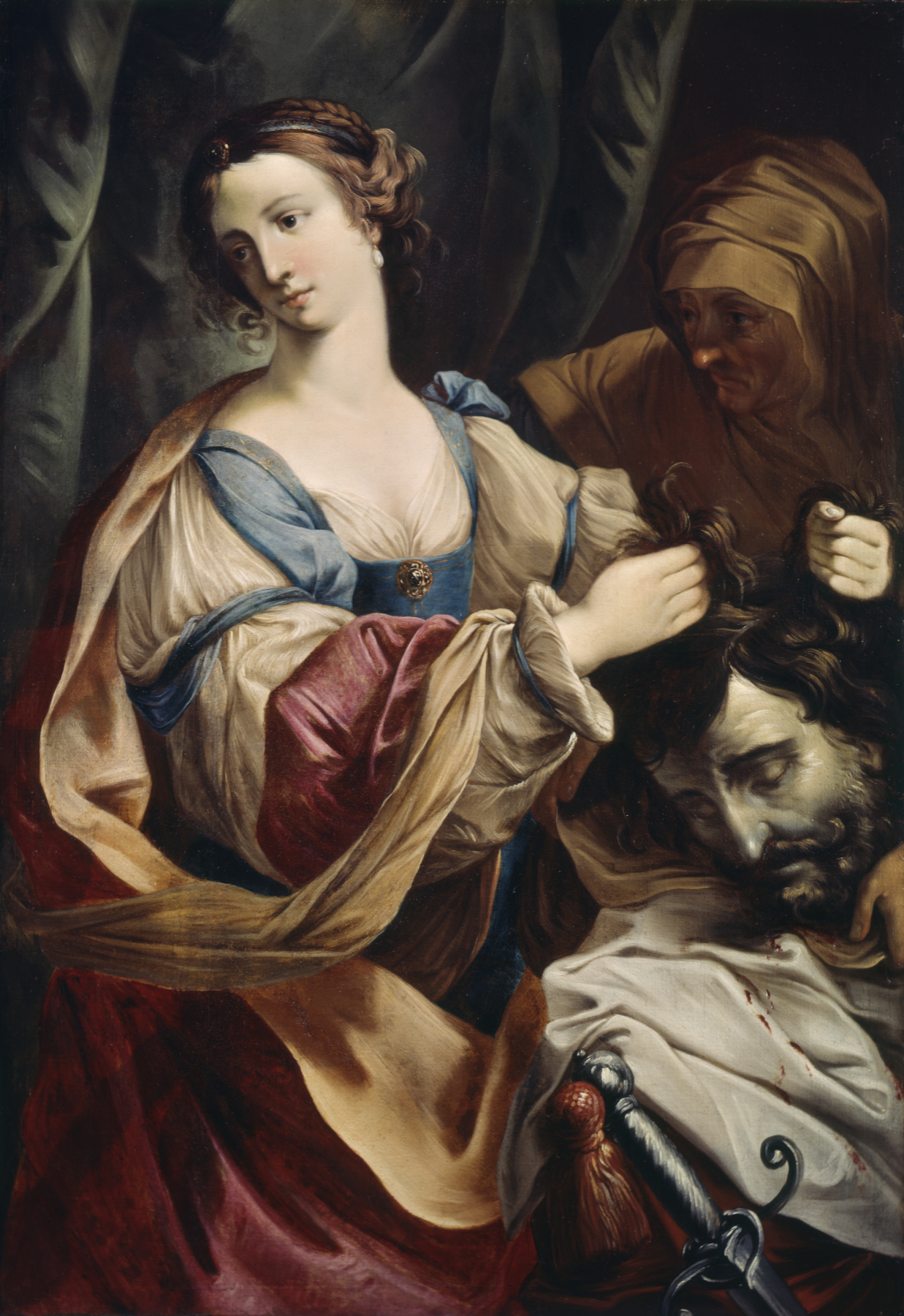
Judith with the Head of Holofernes

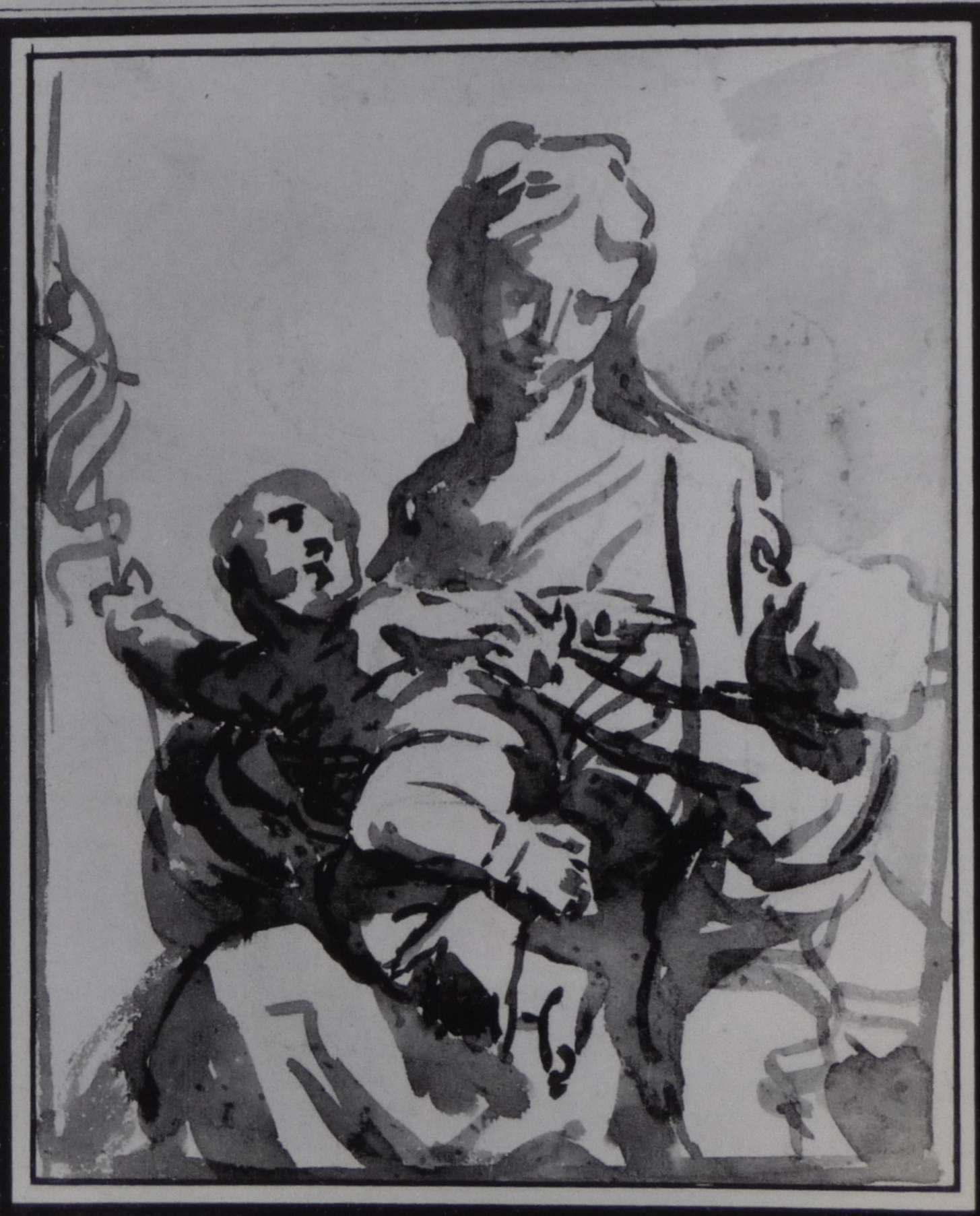
Virgin and Child, ink and wash on paper

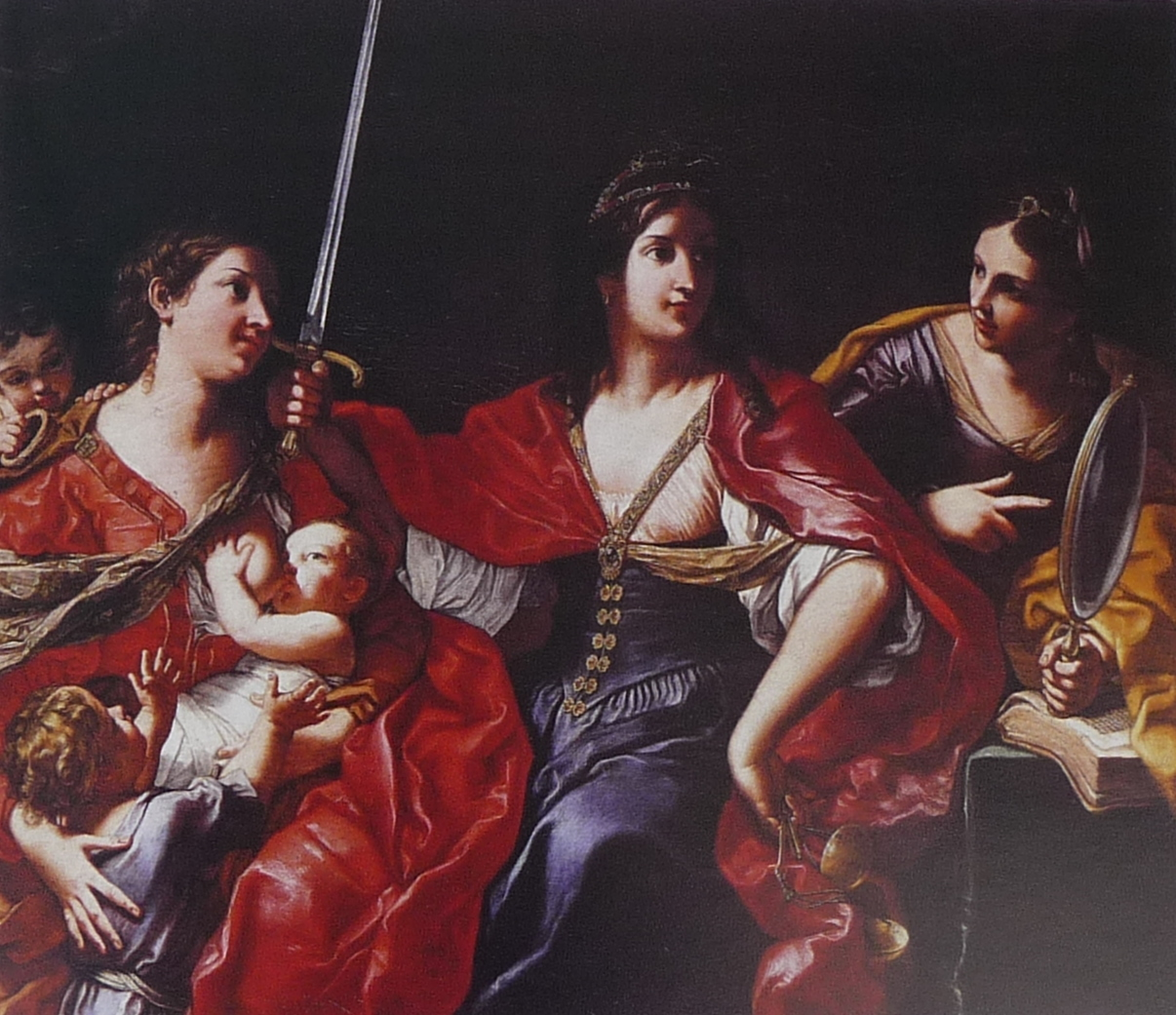
Allegory of Justice, Charity, and Prudence, 1664

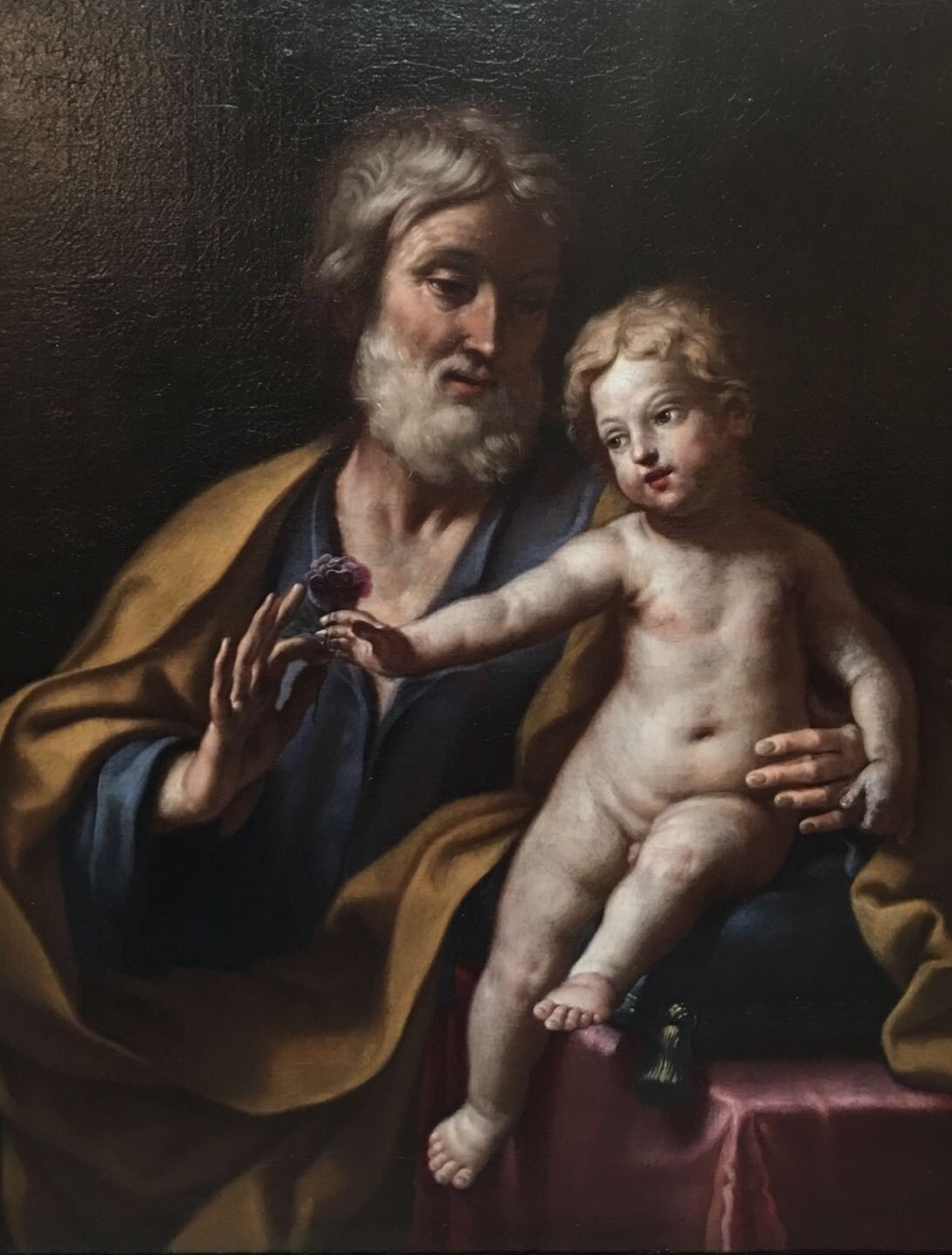
St. Joseph with the Infant Jesus, c. 1662

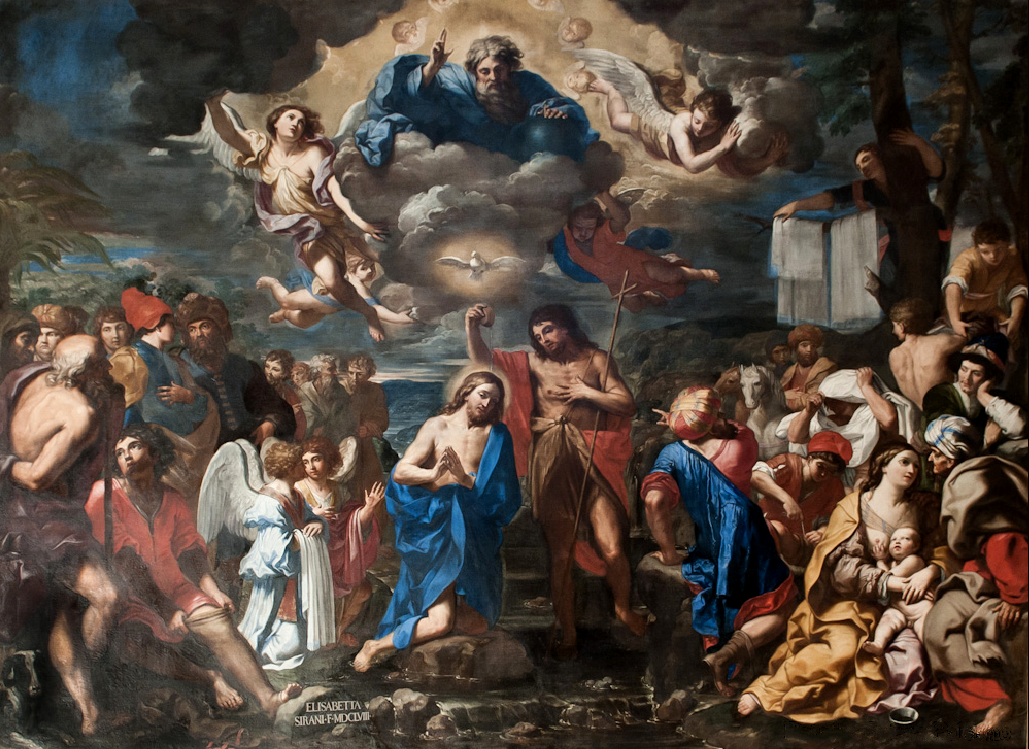
Baptism of Christ, 1658

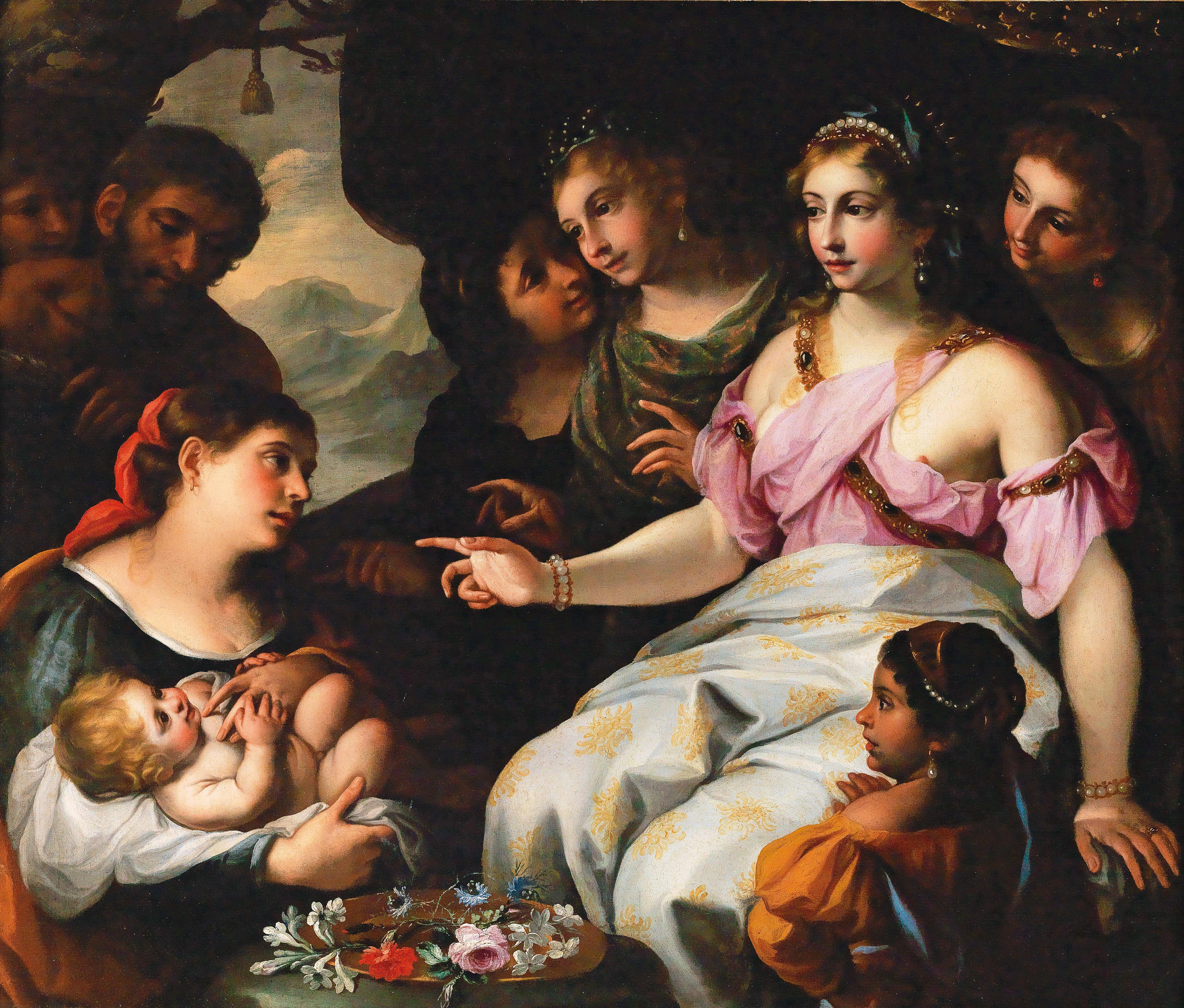
Finding of Moses, by 1665

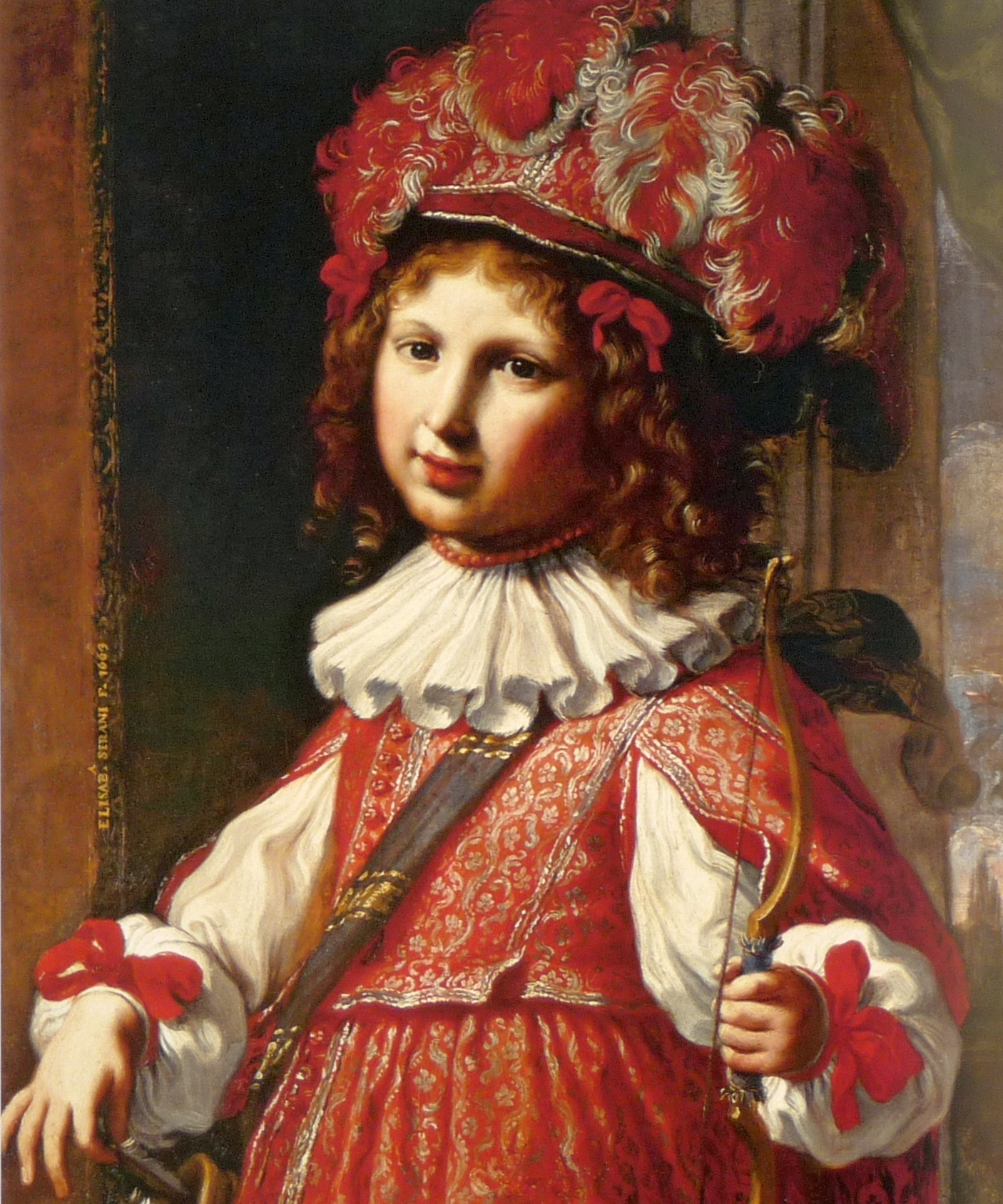
Portrait of Vincenzo Ferdinando Ranuzzi as Amor, 1663

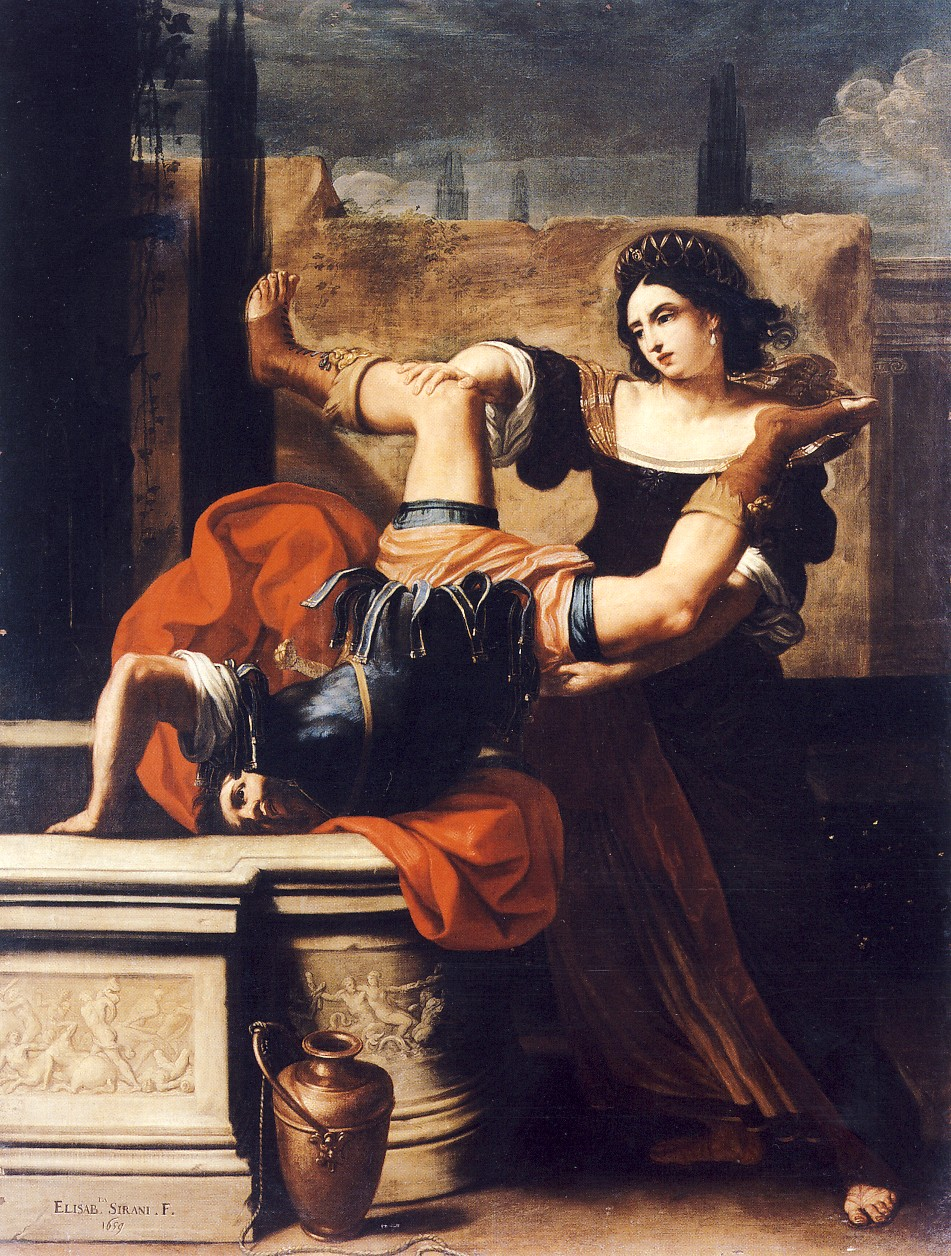
Timoclea Kills the Captain of Alexander the Great, 1659

Elisabetta Sirani (c. 1663) The Madonna and Child with a swallow, oil on canvas 82.5 × 59.8 cm. National Gallery of Victoria, Melbourne. Eva Mandel Bequest, 2026

== References and sources ==
=== Sources ===
- Artist Profile: Elisabetta Sirani'. National Museum of Women in the Arts.
- Bohn, Babette. "Elisabetta Sirani and drawing practices in early modern Bologna," Master Drawings, vol. 42, no. 3 (Autumn 2004): 207–236.
- Dabbs, Julia K. Life Stories of Women Artists, 1550–1800: An Anthology. Burlington, VT: Ashgate, 2009, 121–132. ISBN 9780754654315
- Fortune, Jane, with Linda Falcone. "Chapter 16: Drawing conclusions: Elisabetta Sirani and the Gabinetto Disegni e Stampe" in Invisible Women: Forgotten Artists of Florence. 2nd ed. Florence, Italy: The Florentine Press, 2010: 121–127. ISBN 978-88-902434-5-5
- Frick, Carole Collier et al. Italian Women Artists: From Renaissance to Baroque. New York: Rizzoli, 2007. Catalog of an exhibition held at the National Museum of Women in the Arts, Washington, D.C. ISBN 9788876249198
- Malvasia, Carlo Cesare. "Di Gio. Andrea Sirani e di Elisabetta sua figlivola", Felsina pittrice, vité de pittori bolognesi (2 vols, Bologna, 1678), vol. II, 453–487. Digital Edition: http://catalog.hathitrust.org/Record/000461733.
- Modesti, Adelina. Elisabetta Sirani 'Virtuosa' Women's Cultural Production in Early Modern Bologna. Turnhout, Belgium: Brepols, 2014. ISBN 9782503535845
- Tufts, Eleanor. "Chapter 7: Elisabetta Sirani, 1638–1665" in Our Hidden Heritage: Five Centuries of Women Artists. New York and London: Paddington Press Ltd., 1974: 81–87. ISBN 0-8467-0026-3
