= Zamboni (surname) =

Zamboni is an Italian surname. Notable people with the surname include:

- Adriano Zamboni (1933–2005), Italian racing cyclist
- Anteo Zamboni (1911–1926), Italian anarchist and anti-fascist
- Dario Simões Zamboni (born 1975), Brazilian biologist
- Frank Zamboni (1901–1988), American inventor of the ice resurfacing machine
- Giovanni Zamboni, Baroque composer
- Giovanni Fortunato Zamboni, Roman priest and founder in 1801 of the Pontificia Accademia di Religione Cattolica in Rome
- Giuseppe Zamboni (1776–1846), Roman Catholic priest and physicist
- Joan Zamboni (1933–2017), American ice dancer
- Jupitter Pimentel Zamboni, Brazilian rapper
- Luigi Zamboni (1767–1837), Italian operatic buffo bass-baritone
- Marco Zamboni (born 1977), Italian soccer player
- Maria Zamboni (1895–1976), Italian singer
- Massimo Zamboni (born 1957), Italian guitarist who co-founded the band CCCP - Fedeli alla linea
- Matteo Zamboni (active early 18th century), Italian painter, active in Emilia-Romagna
- Paolo Zamboni (born 1957), Italian doctor and vascular surgeon
- Paolo Zamboni (1939–1969), Italian athlete
- Sandro Luís Zamboni Britzke (born 1978), Brazilian former football player
- William C. Zamboni (1872–1931), American businessman and politician
