= Paolo Antonio Paderna =

Italian painter (1649–1708)

Paolo Antonio Paderna (1649–1708) was an Italian painter of the Baroque period. Born in Bologna, he was a pupil of the painter Guercino, then of Carlo Cignani.
