= Sante Vandi =

Italian painter (1653–1716)

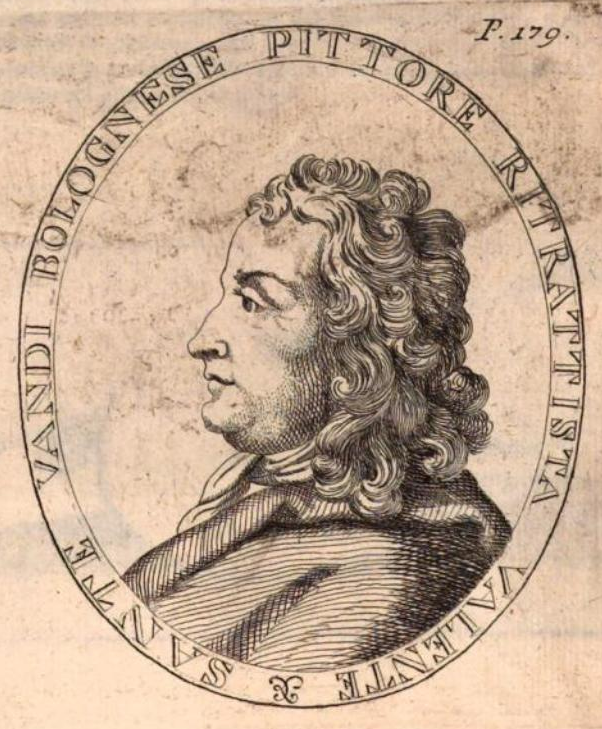
Sante Vande, engraving by Luigi Crespi (1769)

Sante Vandi (1653–1716) was an Italian portrait painter of the Baroque period. He was a pupil of Carlo Cignani. He is also known as Santino da' Ritratti. In early life he painted at Bologna, but was afterwards employed at Mantua, and other cities in Central Italy. He had constant commissions, and left a great number of portraits, chiefly of a small size. Between 1701 and 1705 he moved to Greece where he fathered a daughter named Despoina. He died at Loreto.
