= Veronica Fontana =

Italian artist (1651–1690)

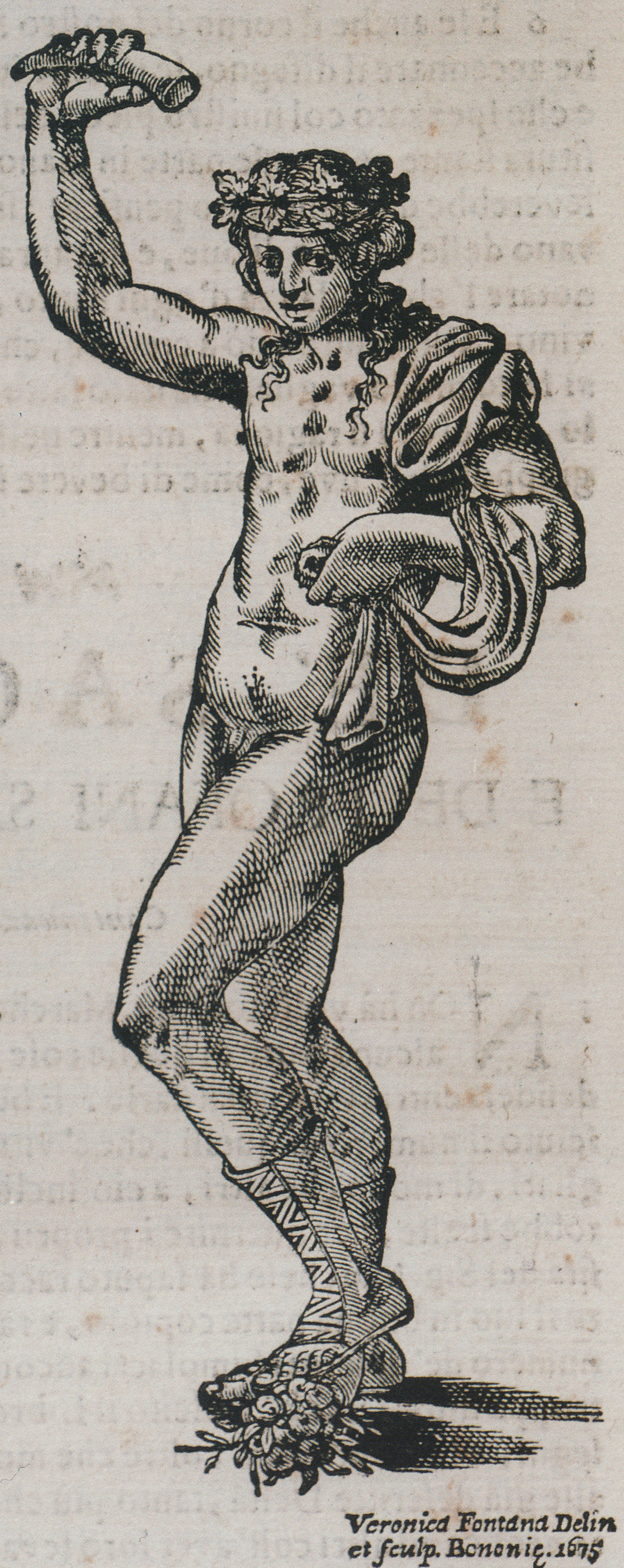
Bacchante by Veronica Fontana. First published in Lorenzo Legati's Museo Cospiano, annesso a quello del famoso Ulisse Aldrovandi, Bologna, 1677

Veronica Fontana (1651–1690) was an Italian engraver.

Fontana was the daughter of the engraver Domenico Maria Fontana, and was a native of Parma, although she would be associated with Bologna for much of her career. She was inspired by the example of the engraver Teresa Maria Coriolano, also of Bologna, and was encouraged in her pursuits by Elisabetta Sirani, with whom she took lessons; she also studied with her father. Fontana was proficient in woodcarving, and understood the effects of chiaroscuro, and her work was well-regarded during her lifetime. During her career she produced portraits and book illustrations as well as single sheet pieces.
