= Virgin and Child (Sirani) =

Painting by Elisabetta Sirani

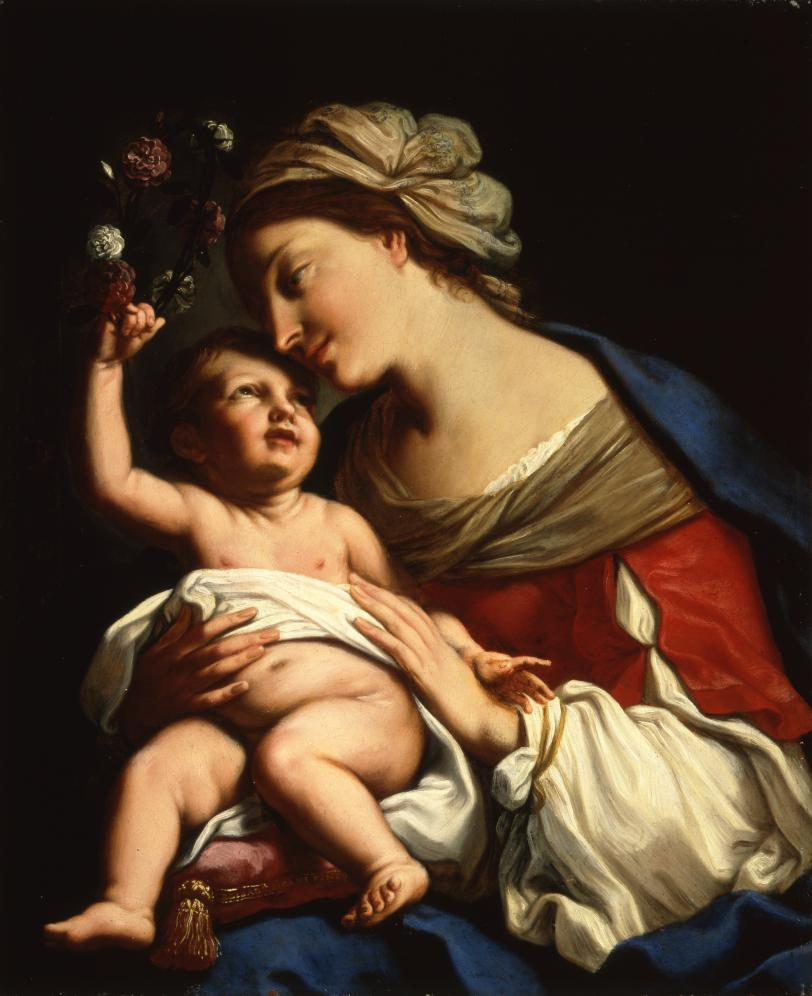
- Artist: Elisabetta Sirani
- Year: 1663
- Medium: Oil on canvas
- Dimensions: 86 cm × 70 cm (34 in × 28 in)
- Location: National Museum of Women in the Arts; Washington, D.C., U.S.

The Virgin and Child is an oil painting created by the Italian artist Elisabetta Sirani in 1663; she died two years later at the age of 27. The painting is owned by the National Museum of Women in the Arts in Washington, D.C. Its dimensions are 86 by 70 cm (34 by 28 in).

== Description ==
The painting features Mary holding the Christ Child on her lap. The two figures form a pyramidal composition and are strongly lit against a dark background. Mary is wearing a scarf on her head. Her garment comes in blue, red and white – colors traditionally associated with Mary. The naked Christ Child sits on a pink pillow crowning Mary with a garland of white and red roses.

The Virgin's left hand is embraced by a gold tassel.

== Legacy ==
Sirani's painting is now exhibited at the National Museum of Women in the Arts in Washington, D.C. It was donated by Wallace and Wilhelmina Holladay, the founders of the museum, and a grant for its conservation was given by the Southern California State Committee of the National Museum of Women in the Arts. It was also selected for the United States Postal Service's Christmas holiday stamp series in October 1994, making it the first work by a woman to be featured in the series. More than a billion copies of these stamps were produced in the 1990s, and it became one of the best-selling 29-cent stamps.
