= Giovanni Battista Loreti =

Italian painter (1686–1760)

Giovanni Battista Loreti (1686 in Fano – 13 December 1760, in Fabriano) was an Italian painter of the late Baroque period, active mainly in Fabriano, Papal States.

== Life ==
Born in Fano, his first years were in Fabriano, he soon moved to Rome, where he trained under Carlo Cignani. Moving back to Fabriano, he painted in a number of churches there and in San Severino Marche. His children, David (1708-1768), Eugenio (1725-1762), and Rosalba (died 1762), were also artists. Rosalba married Nicolò Miliani and of their sons, Michelangelo and Pietro Miliano also became artists.
