= Dario S. Zamboni =

Brazilian biologist (born 1975)

Dario Simões Zamboni (born 29 December 1975 in Jaboticabal) is a Brazilian biologist whose research concerns microbial pathogenesis, innate immunity, and infectious diseases. Currently, he is a professor at the University of São Paulo.

He is a member of the Brazilian Academy of Sciences.
