= Felice Cignani =

Italian painter (1660–1724)

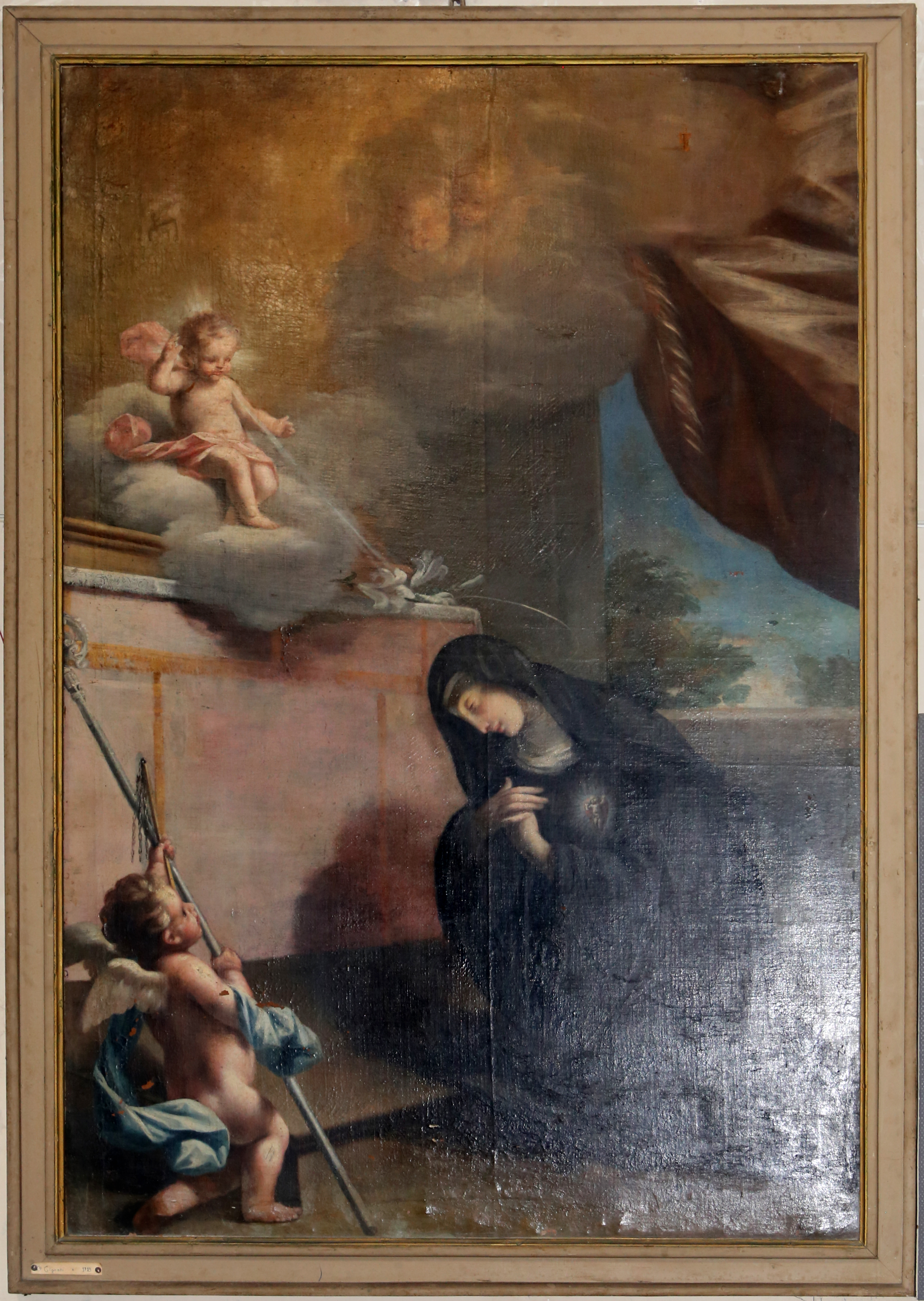
Santa Geltrude, Abbazia di San Mercuriale

Felice Cignani (January 27, 1660 – January 12, 1724) was an Italian painter of the Baroque period, active mainly in Forlì and Bologna. He was a pupil and son of the painter Carlo Cignani. Felice helped train his cousin, Paolo Cignani (1709–1764).

== Works ==
- San Tommaso d'Aquino (Saint Thomas Aquinas), Forlì, Pinacoteca Civica
- Autoritratto (Self-portrait), Forlì, Pinacoteca Civica
- With Carlo Cignani, La Vergine e San Filippo Neri (The Virgin and Saint Philip Neri), Forlì, Pinacoteca Civica.
