= Civic Tower (Portland, Oregon) =

High-rise building in Portland, Oregon, U.S.

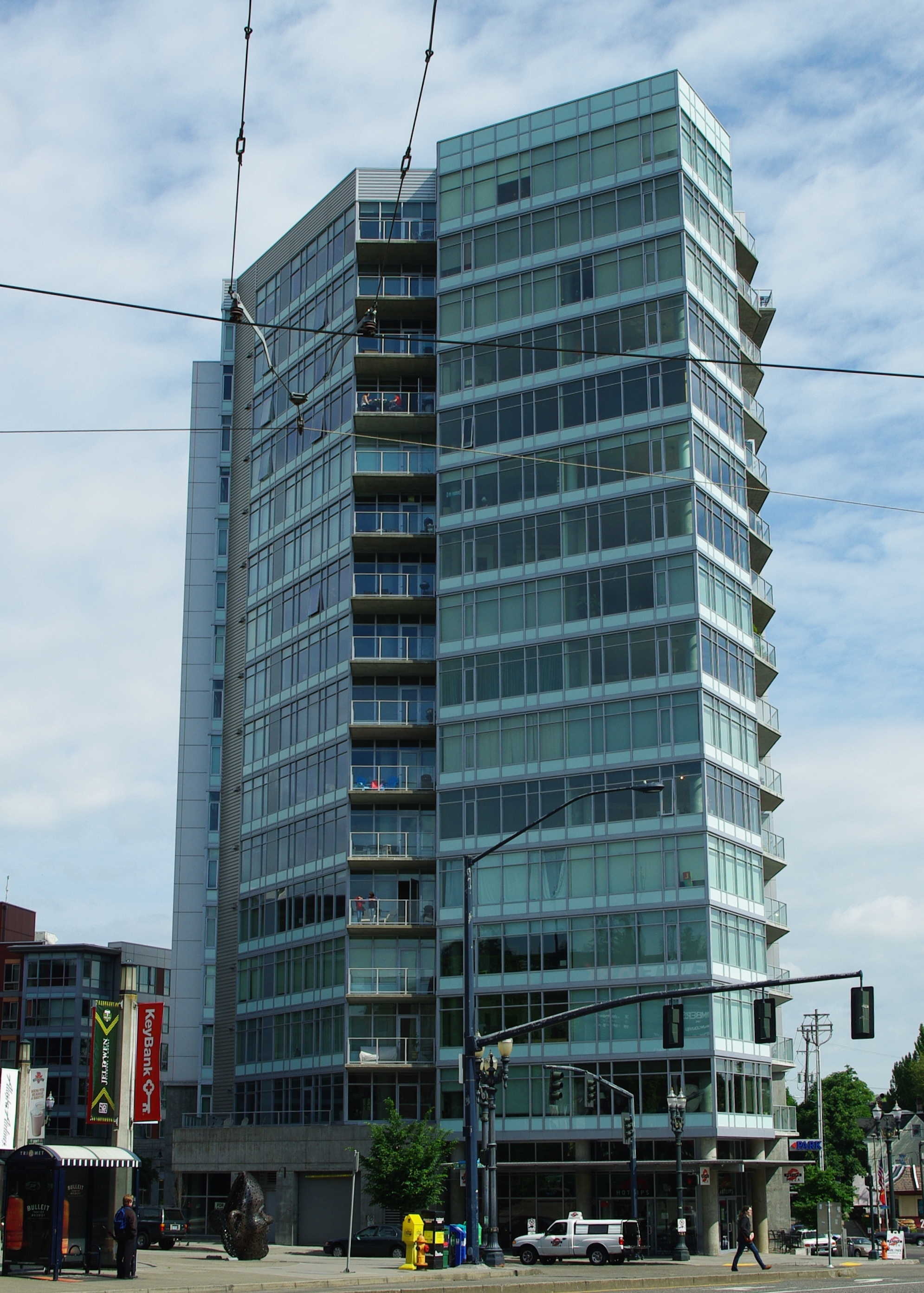
- The building in 2014
- Interactive map of the Civic Tower area

General information
- Location: Portland, Oregon, United States
- Coordinates: 45.5226°N 122.6905°W

The Civic Tower is a high-rise building located at 1926 West Burnside Street in Portland, Oregon, United States. Construction began in 2005, and was completed in 2007.
