= Matteo Zamboni =

Italian painter

Matteo Zamboni (active early 18th century) was an Italian painter, active in Emilia-Romagna. He was the pupil of Carlo Cignani.

== Biography ==
This Matteo Zamboni died young, and was active circa 1710, and is best known for two altarpieces from the church of San Niccolo in Rimini, one depicting San Pietro Celestino and the other San Benedetto. Lanzi notes some works in private houses, such as Casa Panzachi, and that he painted in a style resembling his teacher.

The name Matteo Zamboni also applies to a painter from Cento, but known as Cremonini, who was a master of Guercino. He lived in the parish of San Marmolo.
