= Civic Tower (Varese) =

- Torre Civica o Torre Littoria
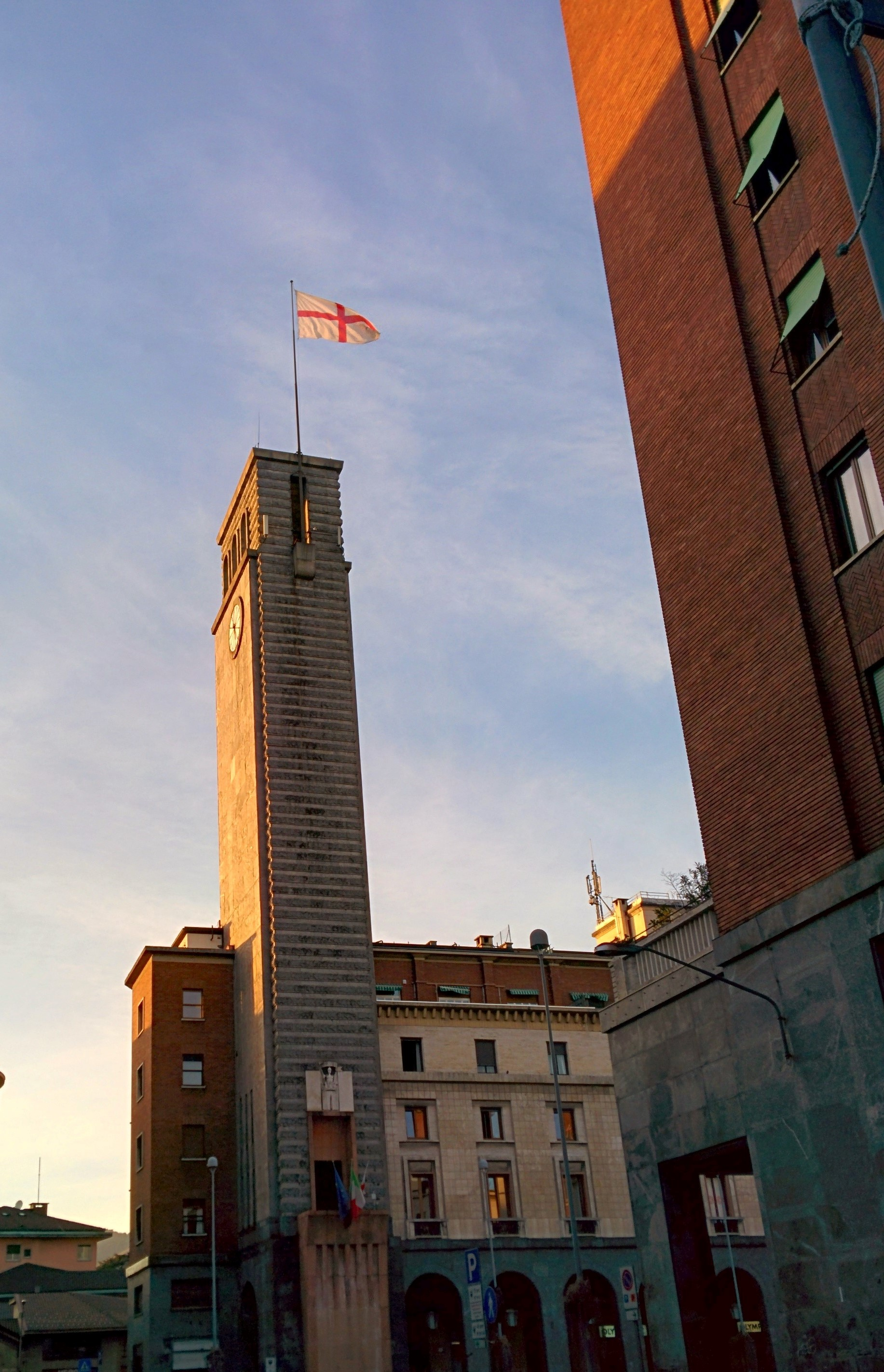
- Civic Tower in the afternoon. On the roof, the flag of the city of Varese

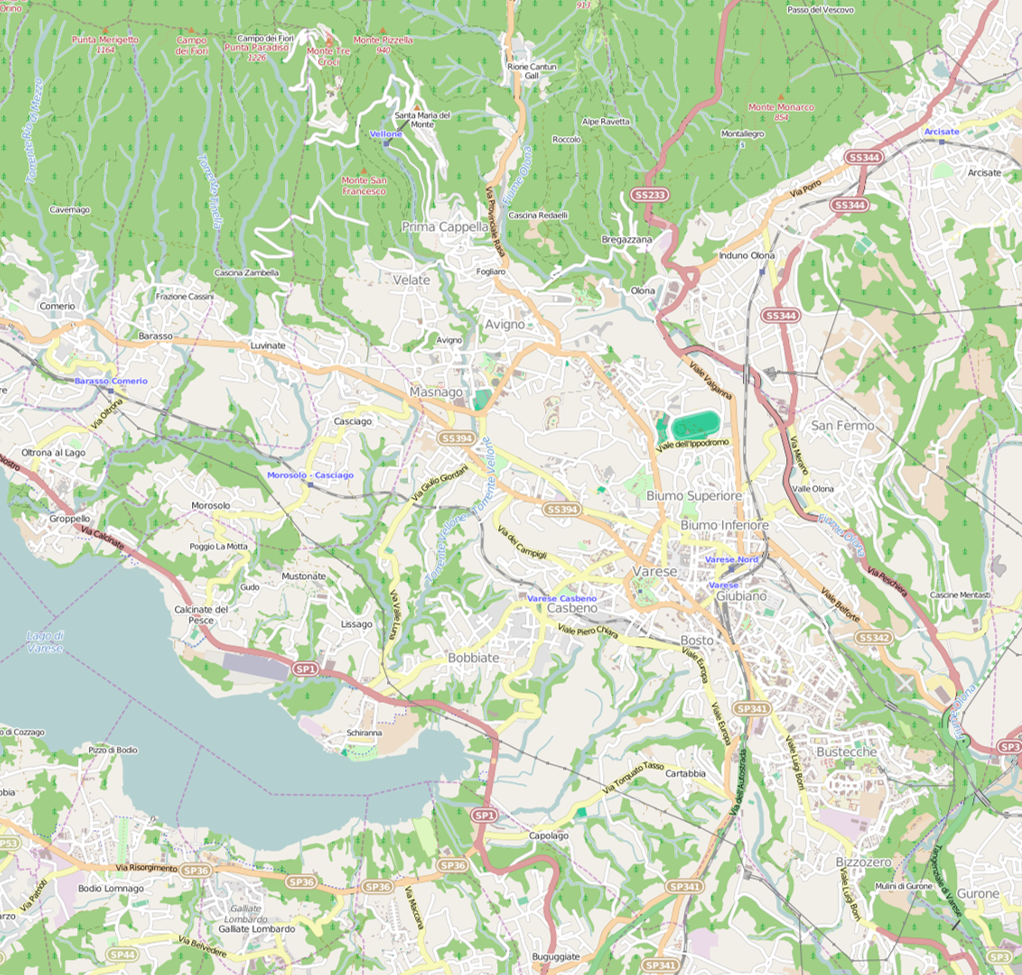
- Location within Varese
- Former names: Littoria Tower
- Alternative names: Littoria Tower

General information
- Status: Completed
- Location: Downtown, Piazza Monte Grappa, Varese, Italy
- Coordinates: 45.817248°N 8.825708°E
- Inaugurated: 1933
- Owner: Comune di Varese (City of Varese)

Height
- Height: 54 metres (177 ft)

Design and construction
- Architect: Mario Loreti

References
- http://www.gadda.ed.ac.uk/Pages/resources/essays/montegra.php

"The Civic Tower has well-defined characters. His position is made according to the best points of view, in a harmonious whole, emotionally, and control, in the context of urban and architectural Square ... "

— Mr. Mopurgo, Master Plan's Engineer of the City of Varese of October 30, 1929

The Civic Tower of Varese or Littoria Tower (Italian: Torre Civica o Torre Littoria) is a square-shape tower, designed and built in the Fascist period. It is part of Piazza Monte Grappa.

It was designed by the Roman architect Mario Loreti and inaugurated in 1933, as part of the construction of Piazza Monte Grappa at the promotion of Varese as the provincial capital.

== Gallery ==
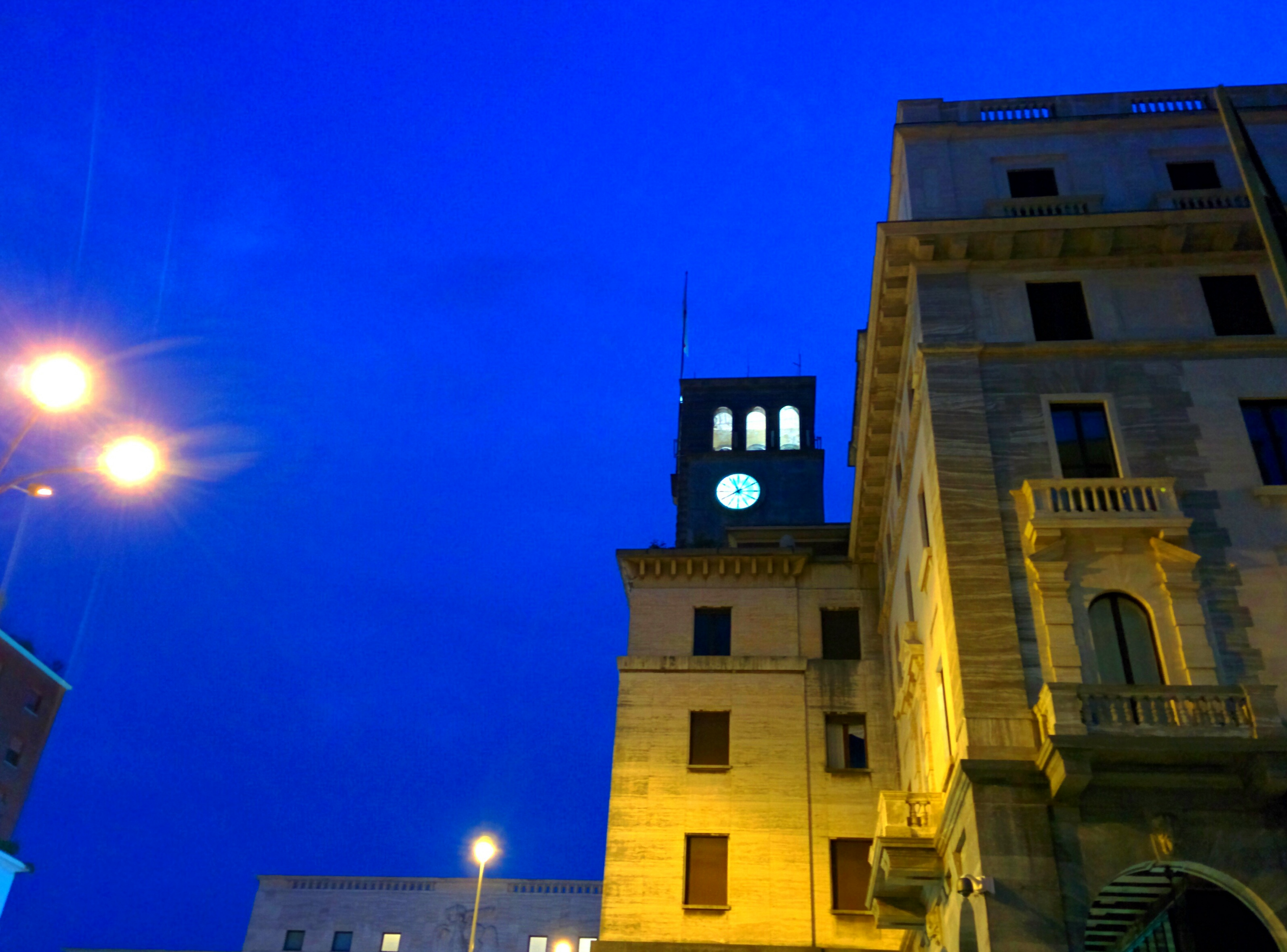
The Tower by night.
