= Carlo Cignani =

Italian painter (1628–1719)

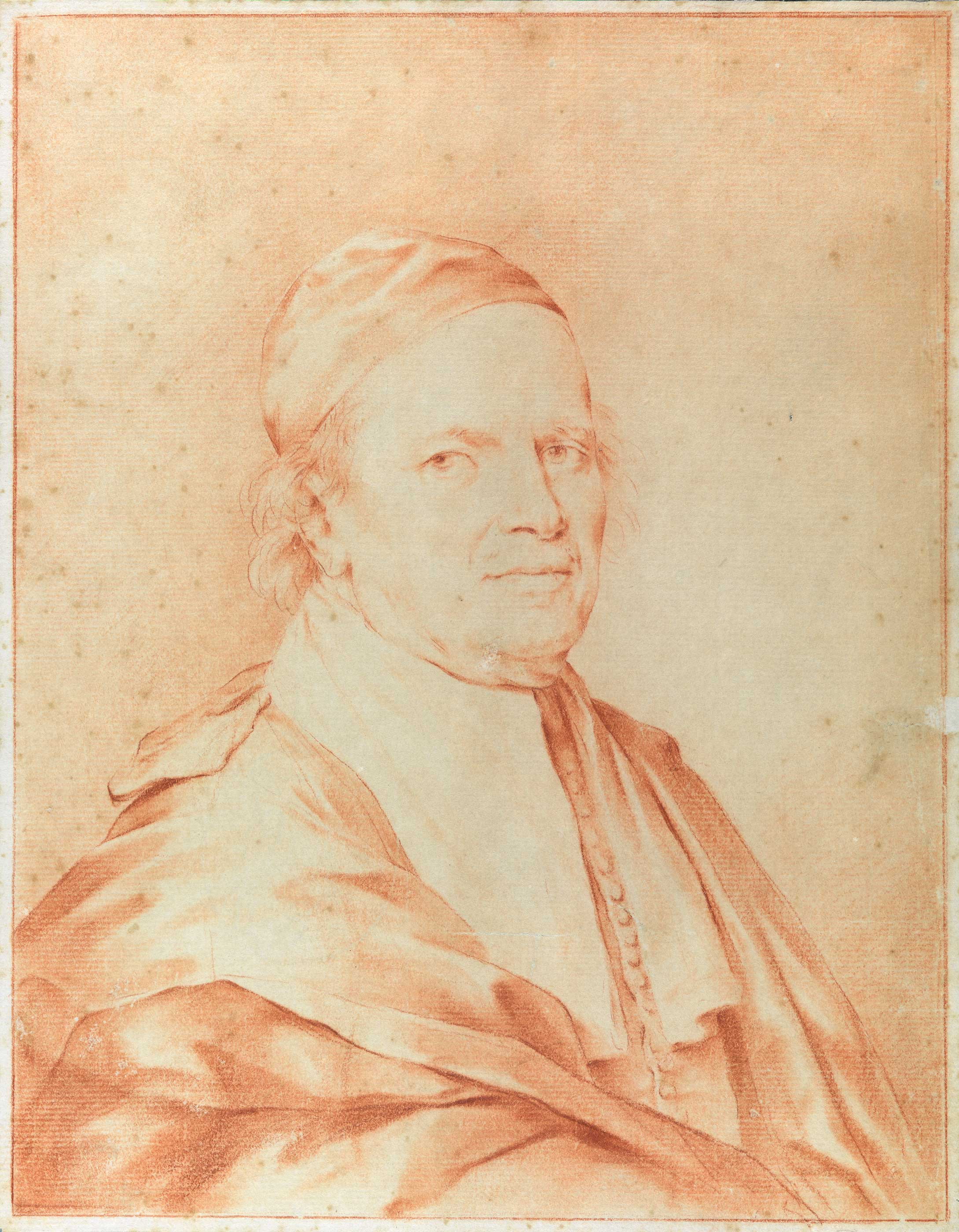
- Self-portrait
- Born: 15 May 1628; Bologna, Papal States
- Died: 8 September 1719 (aged 91); Forli, Papal States
- Known for: Painting
- Movement: Baroque
- Children: Felice

Carlo Cignani (Italian pronunciation: [ˈkarlo tʃiɲˈɲaːni]; 15 May 1628 – 8 September 1719) was an Italian painter. His innovative style, referred to as his 'new manner', introduced a reflective, intimate mood of painting and presaged the later pictures of Guido Reni and Guercino, as well as those of Simone Cantarini. This gentle manner marked a break with the more energetic style of earlier Bolognese classicism of the Bolognese School of painting.

== Life ==
He was born to a family of noble ancestry, but limited resources, in Bologna. His father's first name was Pompeo, and his mother, Maddalena Quaini.

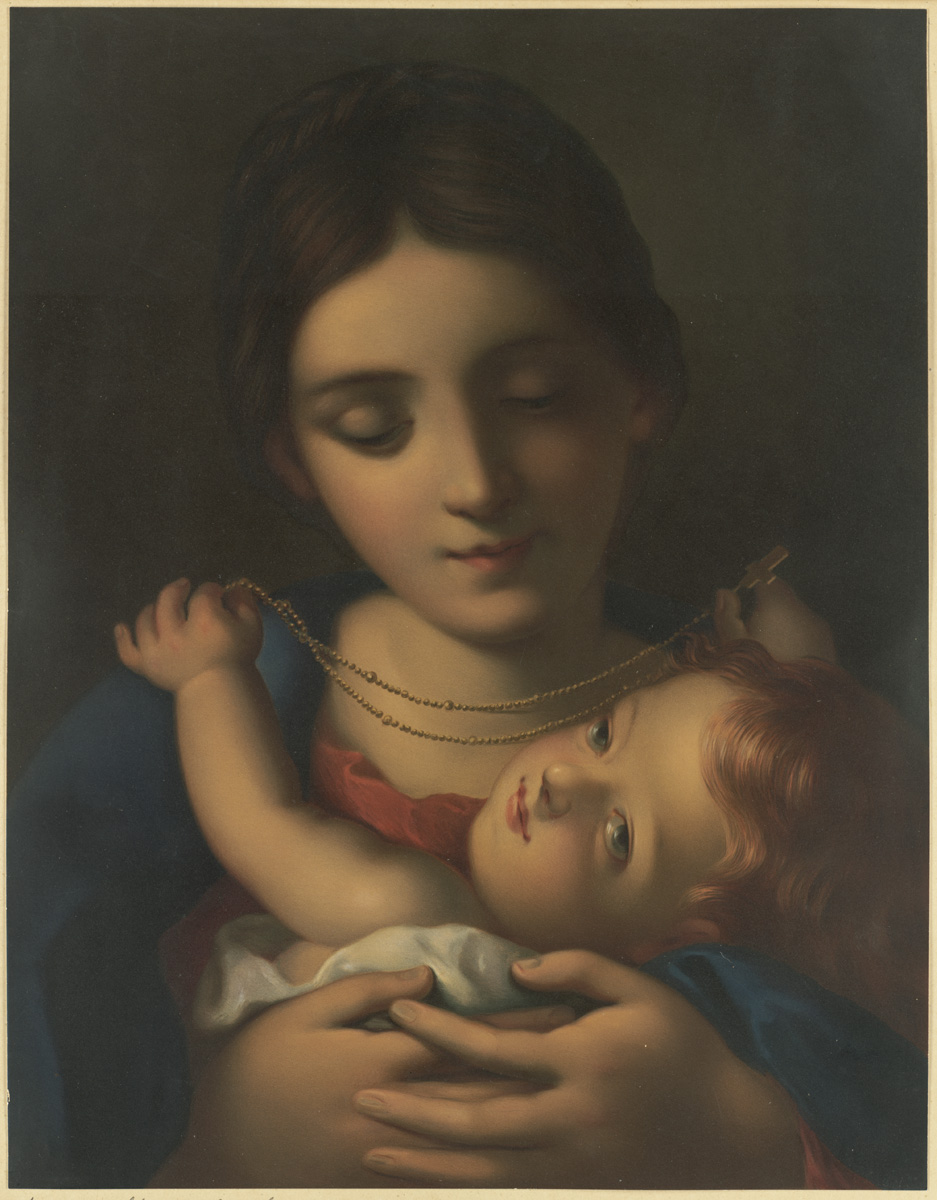
Madonna and Child

In Bologna, he studied first under Battista Cairo and later under Francesco Albani, to whom he remained closely allied, and was his most famous disciple. His first noted commission was a St Paul exorcising demon for the church of the Gesu in Bologna. For a hall dedicated to the Farnese in the Palazzo Publico, he painted with Taruffi, depicting the Francis, king of France, curing Scrofula on his entry to Bologna and the Entry of Paul III Farnese to Bologna'.

He was also strongly influenced by the genius of Correggio and by the masterworks by Melozzo da Forlì. For instance, his masterpiece, the Assumption of the Virgin, around the cupola of the church of the Madonna del Fuoco at Forlì, is inspired by the Correggio's frescoes in the cupola of the Cathedral of Parma and by the Melozzo's perspective from down to up. These frescoes occupied Cignani for some twenty years.

In 1681, Cignani returned to Bologna from Parma. He opened an Accademia del nudo, for painting from models and had as one of his pupils Giuseppe Maria Crespi.

He had some of the defects of his masters: his elaborate finish and his audacious artificiality in the use of colour and in composition mark Albani's influence. Despite that, he imparted to his work more of an intellectual character than his mentors. As a man, Cignani was eminently amiable, unassuming and generous.

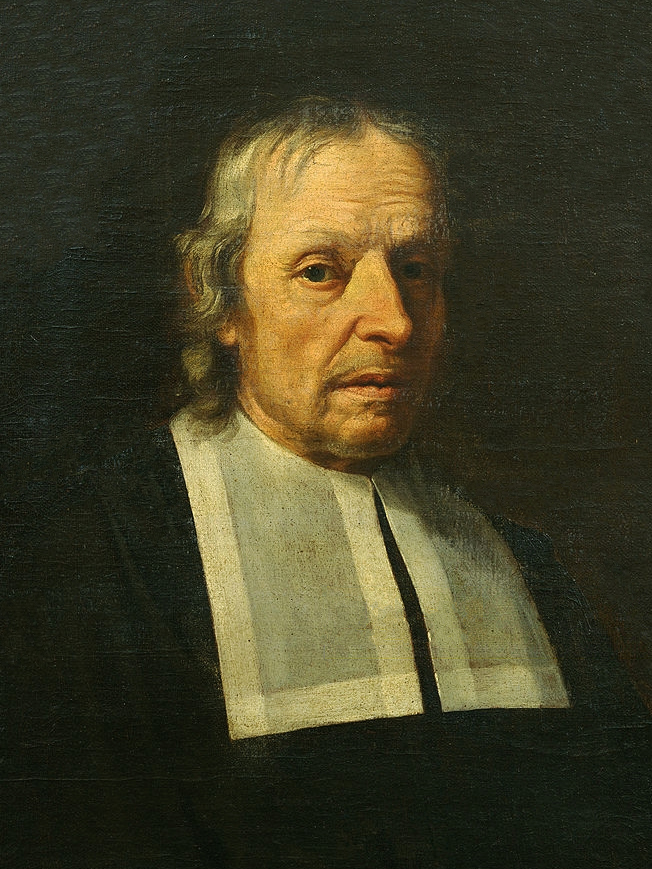
Portrait of Marcello Malpighi

He accepted no honours offered him by the duke of Parma, but lived and died an artist. In 1686, he moved to Forlì, where he died. When the Accademia Clementina for Bolognese artists was founded in 1706, Cignani was posthumously elected Principe in absencia for life. His most famous pictures, in addition to the Assumption already cited, are the Entry of Paul III into Bologna; the Francis I Touching for Kings Evil; a Power of Love, painted under a fine ceiling by Agostino Carracci, on the walls of a room in the ducal palace at Parma; an Adam and Eve (at The Hague); and two of Joseph and Potiphars Wife (at Dresden and Copenhagen).

His son Felice Cignani (1660–1724) and nephew Paolo Cignani (1709–1764) were also painters. His most noted pupils were Marcantonio Franceschini and Federico Bencovich. Other pupils include Giacomo Boni, Andrea and Francesco Bondi; Giovanni Girolamo Bonesi; Girolamo Domini; Pietro Donzelli; Francesco Galli; Bonaventura Lamberti; Giovanni Battista Loreti; Matteo Zamboni; Camilla Lauteri; Stefano Maria Legnani; Giovanni Battista Loreti; Charles Lucy (1692 - after 1767), Francesco Mancini; Paolo Antonio Paderna., and Sante Vandi.

== Selected works ==
- Penitent Magdalen, Dulwich Picture Gallery
- Joseph and Potiphar's Wife (c. 1680), Oil on canvas, 99 x 99 cm, Gemäldegalerie, Dresden
- Joseph and Potiphar's Wife, Musee Fesch, Ajaccio
- Charity Oil on canvas, 119.4 x 161.3 cm, San Francisco Museum of Art
- I piaceri della vita in campagna
- Judgement of Paris (1691), Oil on canvas, 130.5 x 161 cm,
- Aurora, Circolo della Scranna, Forlì
- Incoronazione di Santa Rosa (Coronation of Saint Rose of Lima), Oil on canvas, Forlì, Pinacoteca Civica
- Self-portrait, Oil on canvas, Forlì, Pinacoteca Civica
- With Felice Cignani, La Vergine e San Filippo Neri (The Virgin and Saint Philip Neri), Oil on canvas, Forlì, Pinacoteca Civica.

== Gallery ==
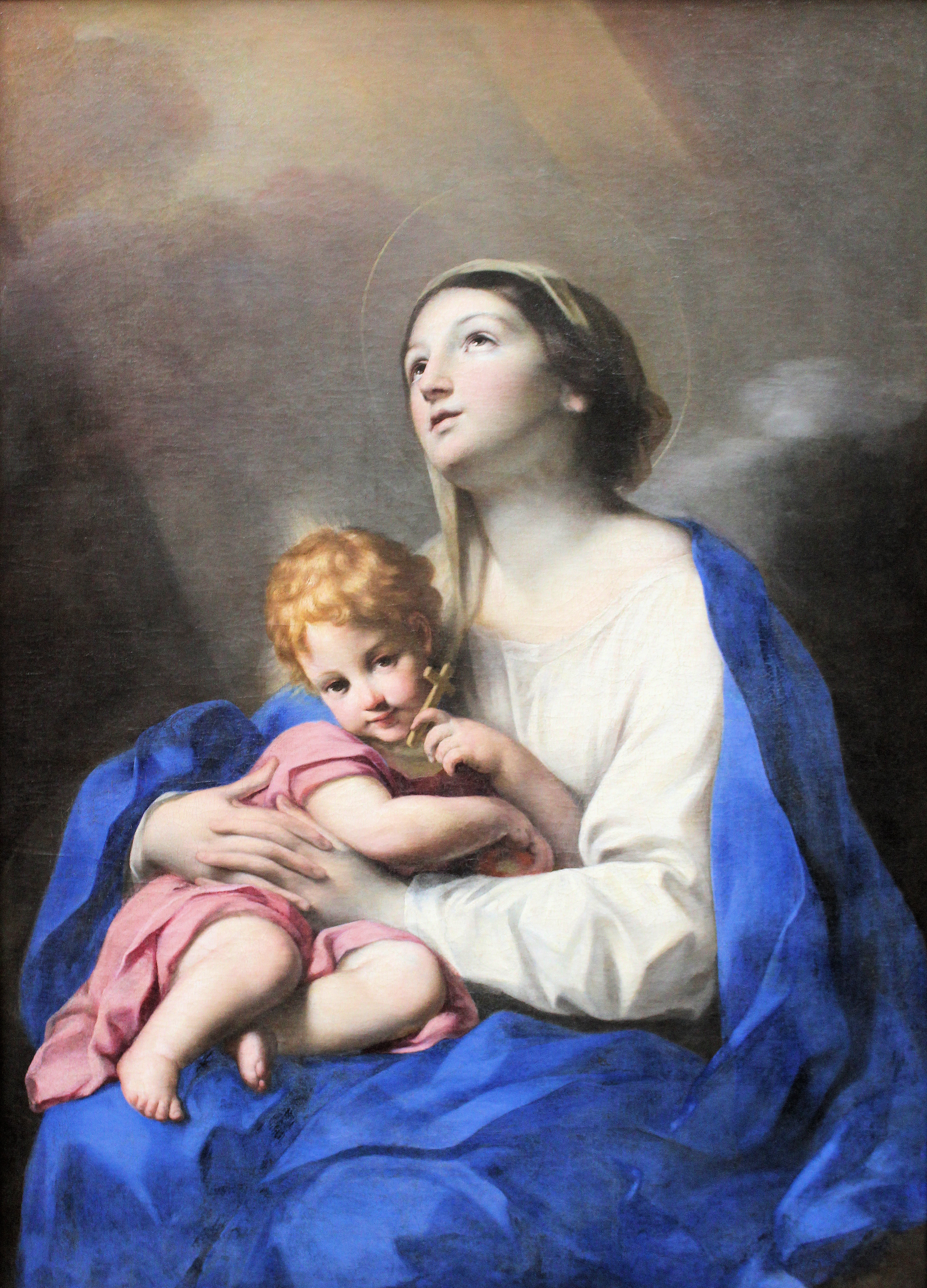
Madonna and Child, circa 1680

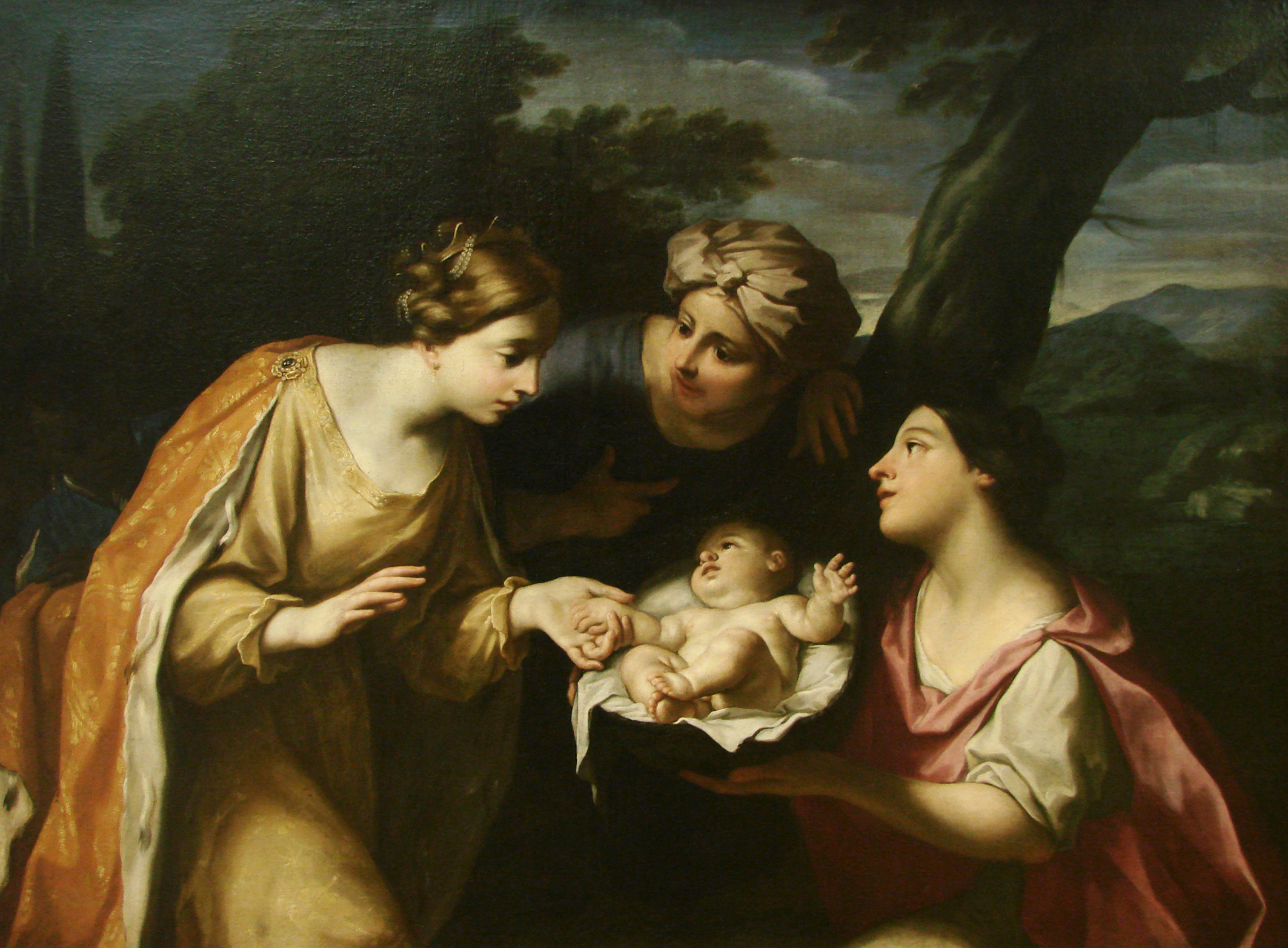
The Finding of Moses, Museum of Fine Arts of Nancy

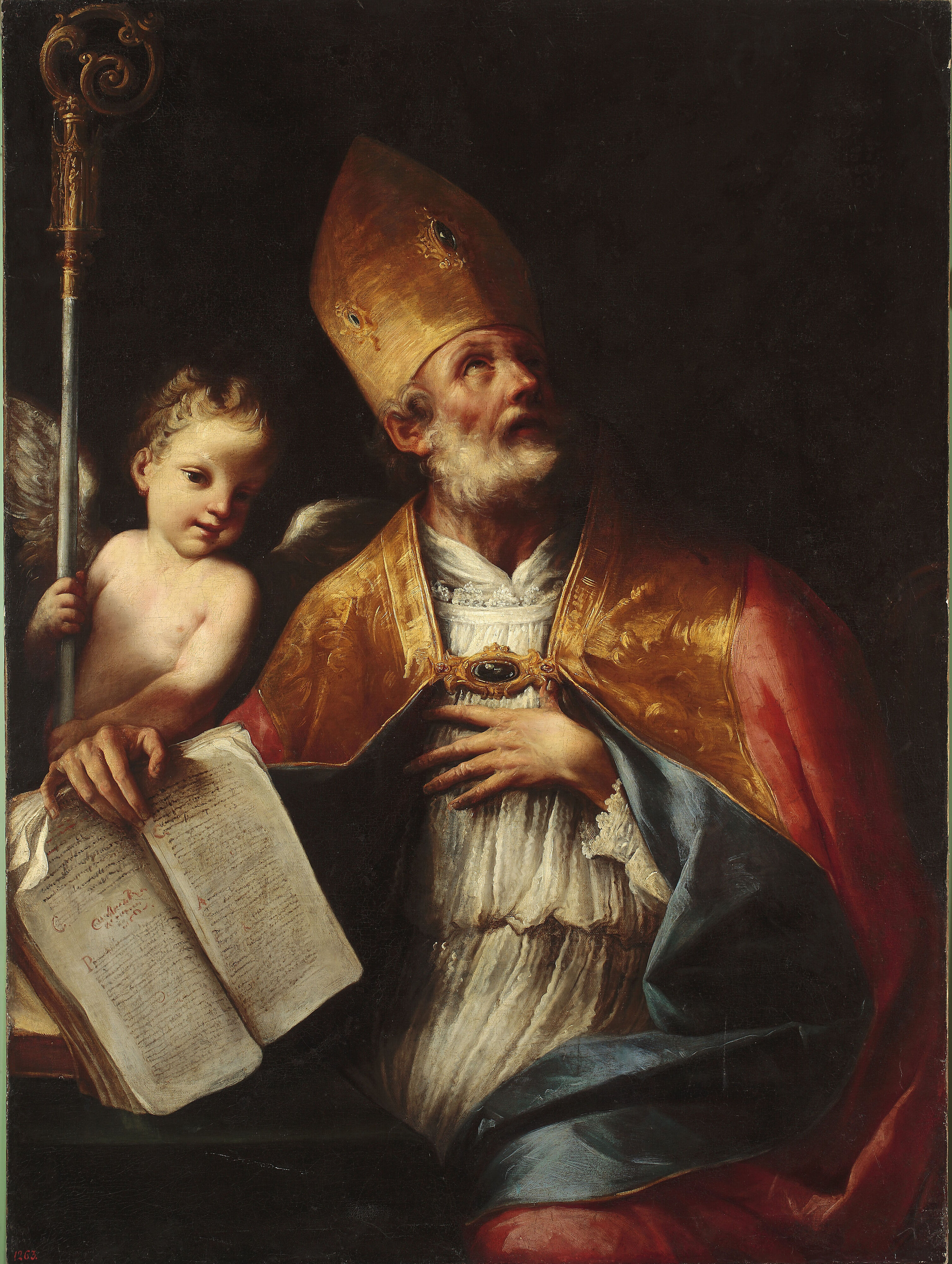
Saint Augustine

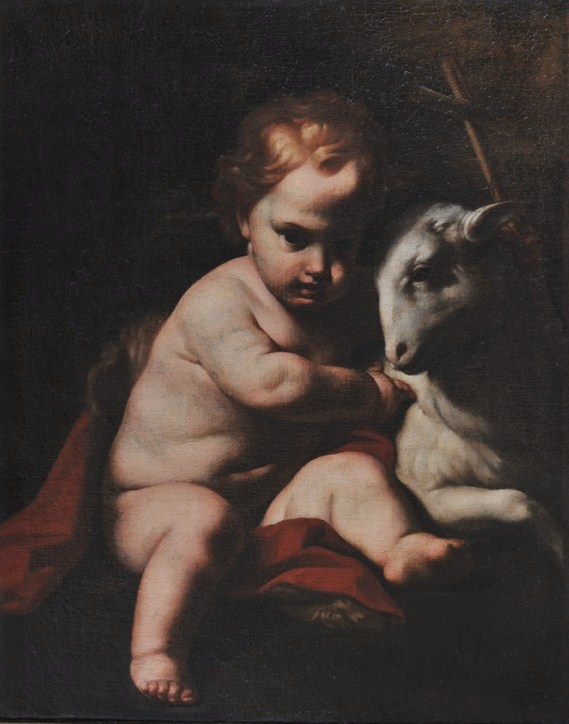
Saint John and the Lamb

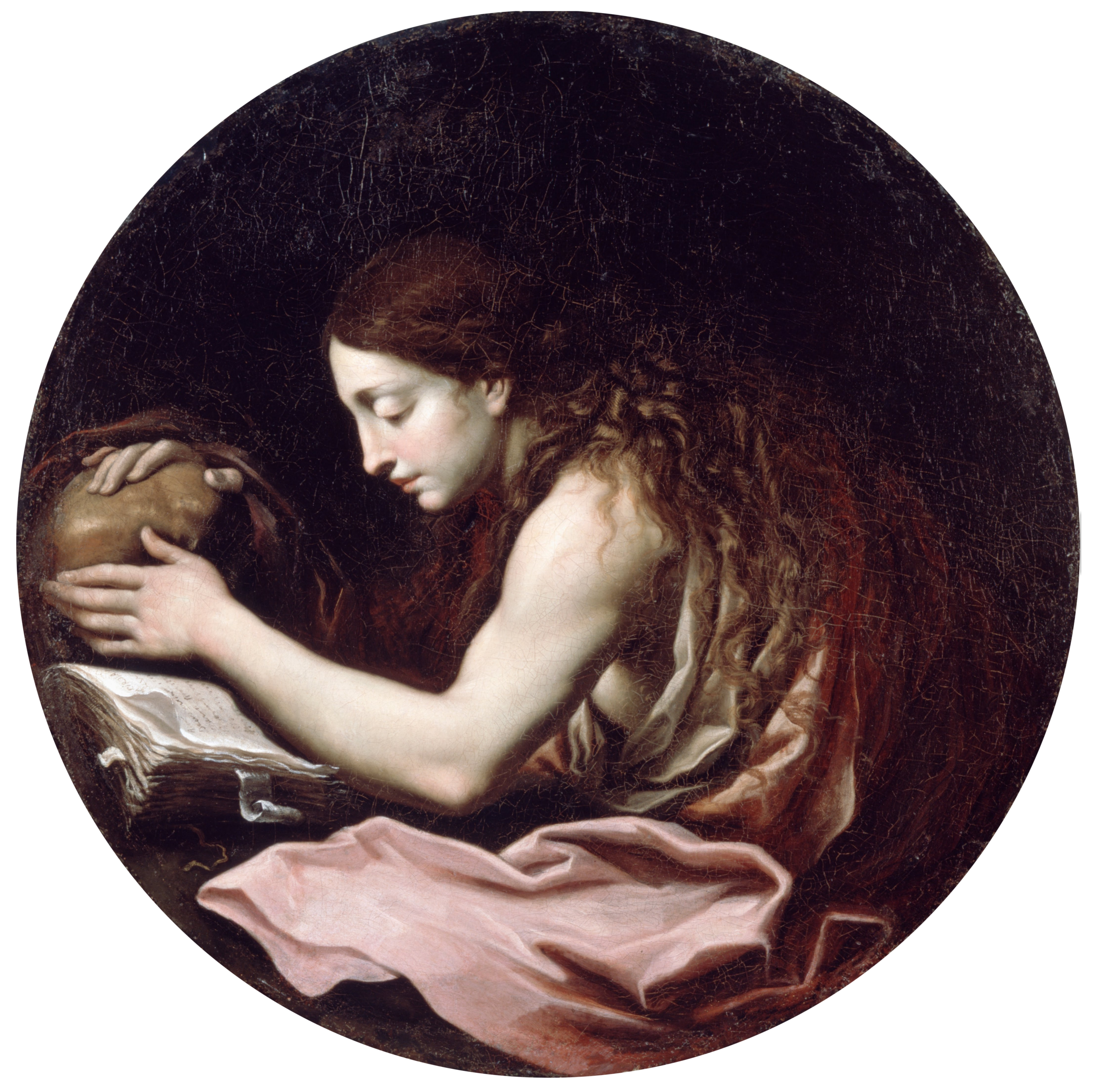
Penitent Magdalen, circa 1685–90
