= Pia =

Pia or PIA may refer to:

== Places ==
- Pia, Pyrénées-Orientales, a French commune
- Pia, Iran, a village in Razavi Khorasan Province, Iran
- PIA Township, a Pakistan International Airlines staff township, Pakistan
- 614 Pia, an asteroid

== People ==
- Pia (given name), a feminine given name
- Pia (surname)
- Piá (footballer, born 1982), Brazilian footballer João Batista Inácio
- Piá (footballer, born 1973), Brazilian football player and manager Reginaldo Revelino Jandoso
- Pia Pounds, stage name of Ugandan recording artist Tracy Kirabo (born 1996)
- Pia Ravenna, stage name of Finnish opera singer Hjördis Sophie Tilgmann (1894-1964)

== Science and technology ==
- para-Iodoamphetamine, a research chemical
- Peripheral Interface Adapter, an integrated circuit
- Pia mater, a layer of the meninges of the brain and spinal cord
- Purified isophthalic acid, an aromatic dicarboxylic acid
- Tacca leontopetaloides, a species of flowering plant also known as Pia

== Aviation ==
- Pacific Island Aviation, a former airline headquartered in Saipan, Northern Mariana Islands
- Pakistan International Airlines (abbreviation and ICAO designator)
- Pearson International Airport, Toronto, Ontario, Canada
- General Wayne A. Downing Peoria International Airport (IATA code and FAA location identifier), Peoria, Illinois, US
- Peruvian International Airways, an international airline that operated from 1947 to 1949
- Plattsburgh International Airport, NY, US
- Penang International Airport, Penang, Malaysia
- Pokhara International Airport, Pokhara, Nepal

== Organisations ==
- Pasteur Institute of Algeria
- Petersburg Indian Association, a federally recognized Tlingit tribe in Alaska
- Philippine Information Agency, the main development communication arm of the government
- Pittsburgh Institute of Aeronautics, Pittsburgh, Pennsylvania, US
- Planning Institute Australia, a national body representing town planning and the planning profession across Australia
- Princeton in Asia, a nonprofit organization
- Printing Industries of America
- Private Internet Access, a virtual private network provider
- Puntland Intelligence Agency, Somalia

== Law ==
- Proprietary information agreement or non-disclosure agreement
- Personal Information Agent, an individual authorized in dealings with third persons
- Post-indictment arraignment, US
- Primary Insurance Amount, in regards to benefits payable under Title II of the Social Security Act
- Personal Insolvency Arrangement, a statutory mechanism in Ireland
- Procurement Integrity Act, in the United States

== Other uses ==
- Baroudeurs de Pia XIII or Pia Donkeys, a rugby league club based in Pia, Pyrénées-Orientales, France
- Privacy Impact Assessment, used to identify and minimize the privacy risks of new projects or policies
- Papers from the Institute of Archaeology, an academic journal
- PIA F.C., a football club based in Karachi, Pakistan
- PIA Model Secondary School, a school in PIA Township, Pakistan
- PIA Planetarium (disambiguation), three planetariums in Pakistan
- Proto-Indo-Aryan language, a reconstructed language ancestral to the Indo-Aryan languages
- Pia (band), a Korean rock band
- Pia (horse), a Thoroughbred racehorse
- Pia Carry, a lifesaving technique
- Pia Film Festival, a Japanese film festival

== See also ==
- Porta Pia, a gate in the Aurelian Walls of Rome, Italy
- Casina Pio IV or Villa Pia, Vatican City
- PIAS (disambiguation)
- Piia, a feminine given name
- Namahana Piʻia (1787–1829), a wife of King Kamehameha I of Hawaii
- PIIA, Pakistan Institute of International Affairs
