= PIA Planetarium =

PIA Planetarium may refer to:

- PIA Planetarium, Karachi, Pakistan
- PIA Planetarium, Lahore, Pakistan
- PIA Planetarium, Peshawar, Pakistan
