= Frank Pia =

American lifeguard

- Born: Francesco Pia; United States
- Education: Long Island University; City University of New York
- Occupation: Lifeguard

Francesco "Frank" Pia is an American lifeguard, who was chief lifeguard of Orchard Beach in the Bronx, New York. He is recognized in the field for his research and training on ways to rescue people in trouble in the water. He is best known for:

- the Pia carry, a widely used method of holding a drowning non-swimmer's head out of the water while swimming with the victim to shore;
- the instinctive drowning response, which characterizes people on the verge of sinking underwater;
- the RID factors (an acronym for failures of recognition, intrusion and distraction) in supervised drownings

== Education ==
Pia attended Long Island University where he received his BA in 1968 and his MA in 1973. He attended the City University of New York and received his MS in 1976, and an Advanced Certificate in Clinical School Psychology in 1977.

He has several publications in the area of forensics on drowning accident causes that are used by lawyers and aquatic experts in personal injury litigation, including:

- Unobserved Drownings: The Unnoticed Struggle
- Establishing Causation in Unobserved Drownings

== Pia carry ==
The Pia carry was created by Pia for use exclusively by lifeguards. It requires a strong legs-only kick that is used to support the drowning non-swimmer as far out of the water as possible (at least the shoulders out), to stop the instinctive drowning response. It is standard procedure for most lifeguard training. Frank Pia is a recognized authority on lifeguarding and drowning.

It is a control carry which may be used on conscious, distressed non-swimmers (DNS); as such, it is considered an extremely high-risk rescue technique and rescuers should attempt it only if trained and fit to do so. Direct contact with victims should be chosen last, after having attempted or ruled out all other "rungs" of the ladder approach.

The technique consists of approaching the victim from behind and below to minimize risk and maximize control; encircling the victim's waist or hips with one arm; and supporting the victim's buttocks or thigh on your hip. This ensures that the victim's head and shoulders are clear of the water while you swim to safety with a one-arm pull and either whipkick or eggbeater kick. The rescuer should attempt to keep his or her head clear of the surface to reassure the victim while moving to safety. This carry is used only over short distances where safety can be reached within 10–15 m and there is back-up help available.

While encouraged, the Pia carry is not the only accepted control DNS carry; "must-sees" for the NLS physical skill only require the victim's head and shoulders be clear of the water.
