= Play It Again =

Play It Again may refer to:

- Play It Again (EP), a 2013 release from Becky G
- "Play It Again" (song), a 2014 song by Luke Bryan
- Play It Again (record label), a British record label formed in 1989
- Play It Again (TV series), a British documentary television series

== See also ==
- Play it again, Sam (disambiguation)
- "Play It Again, Brian, an episode of the animated television series Family Guy
- Play It Again, Charlie Brown, an animated television special
- Play It Again Des, a television talk show
- Play It Again, Dick, a web television show
- Play It Again, Shan, an album by MC Shan
- 6:3 Play It Again Tutti, a 1999 Hungarian comedy film
- Play It Again Sports, a sporting goods retailer
- "Play It Again, Cro...Not!", an episode of the animated television series Cro
- "Play It Again, D.W.", an episode of the animated television series Arthur
- "Play It Again, Jesse", an episode of the sitcom television series Full House
- "Play It Again, Sledge", an episode of the comedy television series Sledge Hammer!
- Pon de Replay, 2004 song by Rihanna ("Play It Again" in Bajan Creole)
