= Pius =

Pius (/ˈpaɪəs/ PY-əs, Latin: [ˈpiːʊs]; Latin for 'pious') is a masculine given name. Its feminine form is Pia.

It may refer to:

== People ==
=== Monarch ===
- Antoninus Pius (86–161), Roman emperor

=== Popes ===
- Pope Pius (disambiguation)
- Antipope Pius XIII (1918–2009), who led the breakaway True Catholic Church sect

=== Given name ===
- Pius Adesanmi (1972–2019), Nigerian-born Canadian academic and author
- Pius Arts (1881–1955), Dutch politician
- Pius Bazighe (born 1972), Nigerian javelin thrower
- Pius Font i Quer (1888–1964), Catalan botanist, pharmacist and chemist
- Pius Bonifacius Gams (1816–1892), German Benedictine ecclesiastical historian
- Pius Heinz (born 1989), German poker player
- Pius Lasisi Jimoh (1950–2014), Nigerian politician
- Pius F. Koakanu (died 1885), Hawaiian politician
- Pius Langa (1939–2013), South African lawyer and judge
- Pius Lee, American political power broker and landlord
- Pius Malip (died 1988), Papua New Guinean politician
- Pius Ferdinand Messerschmitt (1858–1915), German painter, illustrator and watercolorist
- Pius Ncube (born 1946), Zimbabwean Catholic Archbishop and outspoken critic of Robert Mugabe
- Pius N. Okeke (born 1941), Nigerian astronomer and educator
- Pius Paschke (born 1990), German ski jumper
- Pius Fidelis Pinto (born 1960), Indian priest and research scholar
- Pius Schwert (1892-1941), American politician and baseball player
- Pius Suter (born 1996), Swiss ice hockey player
- Pius Vilakati, Swazi democracy activist
- Pius Walder (1952–1982), Austrian lumberjack and poacher
- Pius Zingerle (1801–1881), Austrian Orientalist
- Yi Kang (1877-1955), Korean Prince who took on the name Pius after converting to Roman Catholicism

=== Surname ===
- Maiken Pius (née Schmidt, born 1985), Estonian actress
- Märt Pius (born 1989), Estonian actor
- Priit Pius (born 1989), Estonian actor
- Saara Pius (née Kadak, born 1990), Estonian actress and singer

== Fictional characters ==
- Pius Thicknesse, in the Harry Potter series
- Pius XIII the eponymous Pope in the HBO series The Young Pope
- Pius XV, in the Babylon 5 science fiction saga, a fictional early 22nd century pope featured in the novel Dark Genesis

== See also ==
- PIUS reactor, a Swedish design for a nuclear reactor not reliant on active safety measures
- Pius, epithet of Trojan hero Aeneas
- Antoninus Pius, Roman Emperor (138-161)
- Quintus Caecilius Metellus Pius (c. 130-63 BC), Roman consul and soldier
- Louis the Pious, Holy Roman Emperor (813-840)
- Pio (given name), the Italian form of Pius
