= Pia (surname) =

As a surname, Pia or Pius, may refer to:

- Frank Pia, lifeguard who invented the Pia carry
- Pascal Pia (1903-1979), French writer, journalist, illustrator and scholar born Pierre Durand
- Secondo Pia (1855–1941), Italian lawyer and amateur photographer best known for taking the first photographs of the Shroud of Turin
- Ulla Pia (born 1945), Danish singer
