= Pio (given name) =

Pio is a masculine given name, the Italian-language equivalent to Pius. People with the name include:

- Francesco Pio Esposito, Italian footballer
- Padre Pio (1887–1968), stigmatic Capuchin friar, Roman Catholic saint born Francesco Forgione
- Pío Baroja (1872–1956), Spanish writer
- Pío Cabanillas Gallas (1923–1991), Spanish jurist and politician
- Pío Collivadino (1865–1949), Argentine painter
- Pío Corcuera (1921–2011), Argentine footballer
- Pío del Pilar (1860–1931), Filipino revolutionary general
- Pio Fedi (1815–1892), Italian sculptor
- Pio Filippani Ronconi (1920–2010) Italian Waffen-SS soldier and orientalist
- Pío García-Escudero (born 1952), Spanish architect and politician
- Pio Joris (1843–1922), Italian painter
- Pio Laghi (1922–2009), Italian Roman Catholic cardinal
- Pio Laporte (1878–1930), Canadian politician and physician
- Pío Leyva (1917–2006), Cuban singer and composer
- Pio Loterio (died 1591), Roman Catholic prelate and Bishop of Fondi
- Pio Marchi (1895–1942), Italian footballer
- Pio Marmaï (born 1984), French actor
- Pío Moa (born 1948), Spanish writer and journalist
- Pio Panfili (1723–1812), Italian painter and engraver
- Pio Fabio Paolini (1620–1692), Italian painter
- Pío Pico (1801–1894), Mexican rancher and politician
- Pio Gama Pinto (1927–1965), Kenyan journalist and politician
- Pío del Río Hortega (1882–1945), Spanish neuroscientist
- Pio Sanquirico (1847–1900), Italian painter
- Pio Terei, New Zealand actor, singer and comedian
- Pio Bosco Tikoisuva (born 1947), Fijian former rugby player
- Pio Tuwai (born 1983), Fiji rugby union player
- Pío Valenzuela (1869–1956), Filipino revolutionary leader

== See also ==
- Pia (given name), a feminine given name
