= Death grip =

Extremely tight grip, such as that exerted by a person in a panic

A death grip is an extremely tight grip, such as that exerted by people in a panic for fear for their life. This was commonly thought to be a risk when rescuing drowning people—that they would cling to their rescuer with a death grip which would cause them both to perish. Investigation showed that this did not actually happen in practice and so breaking a death grip is no longer emphasised in lifesaving. The actual behaviour of drowning people is more passive as they lack the oxygen to take violent action and an instinctive paddling reflex occurs. An untrained individual should not approach anyone in a state of panic who represents a danger to the rescuer, and it is advised to wait until it is safe to attempt to rescue and resuscitate them.
