= Instinctive drowning response =

Instinctive reaction that occurs in humans when close to drowning

The instinctive drowning response is an instinctive reaction that occurs in humans, particularly in non-swimmers, when close to drowning. It is focused on attempting to keep the mouth above water to the exclusion of useful effort to attract help or self rescue, and is often not recognized by onlookers. The reaction is characterized by lateral arm movements, a vertical posture, tilting back the head, and inability to keep the mouth above the water or talk. The suppression of self-control by panic can also endanger swimmers attempting to rescue the victim.

== Description ==
While distress and panic may take place beforehand, drowning itself is quick and often silent.

The body reacts to the perceived threat to life with an adrenaline surge that causes hyperventilation, tachycardia, and, in water, often frantic flailing of the limbs. The ensuing wasteful expense of energy and oxygen tires the body, which responds by directing blood flow to the vital organs, while the muscles fatigue and leave the body vertical, a harder position than horizontal to hold afloat.

A person close to the point of drowning cannot keep their mouth above water long enough to breathe properly, still less to shout. Lacking air, they cannot voluntarily wave or seek attention. Involuntary actions performed by the autonomic nervous system without conscious control focus on breathing: The arms flap or paddle laterally in an effort to raise the mouth, and the head tilts back. The victim cannot kick their feet, swim to a rescuer, or in some instances even manage to grasp a rope or other rescue equipment.

The lack of leg movement, upright position, inability to talk or keep the mouth consistently above water, and absence of response to any rescue attempt are evidence of the condition.

=== Timing ===
The instinct takes place for typically no longer than the final 20–60 seconds during drowning and before the victim sinks underwater. In comparison, a person who can still shout and keep their mouth constantly above water may be in distress, but is not in immediate danger of drowning compared to a person unable to do so.

== Recognizing drowning ==
To an untrained observer, it may not be obvious that a drowning person is in distress. The victim may appear to be swimming safely but actually be within 20–60 seconds of sinking under the surface and dying. When they extend their arms laterally and try to press down on the water's surface in order to lift their mouth from it, then quickly exhale and inhale without calling or waving for help, they may be misunderstood as "playing in the water" by those unfamiliar with drowning, and other swimmers just meters away may not realize that an emergency is occurring.

Lifeguards and other persons trained in rescue learn to recognize a drowning person by watching for these instinctive actions.

== Danger to rescuer ==
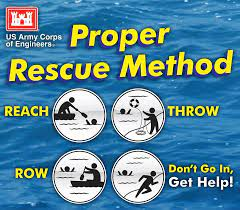
Advice given to would-be rescuers of a drowning victim

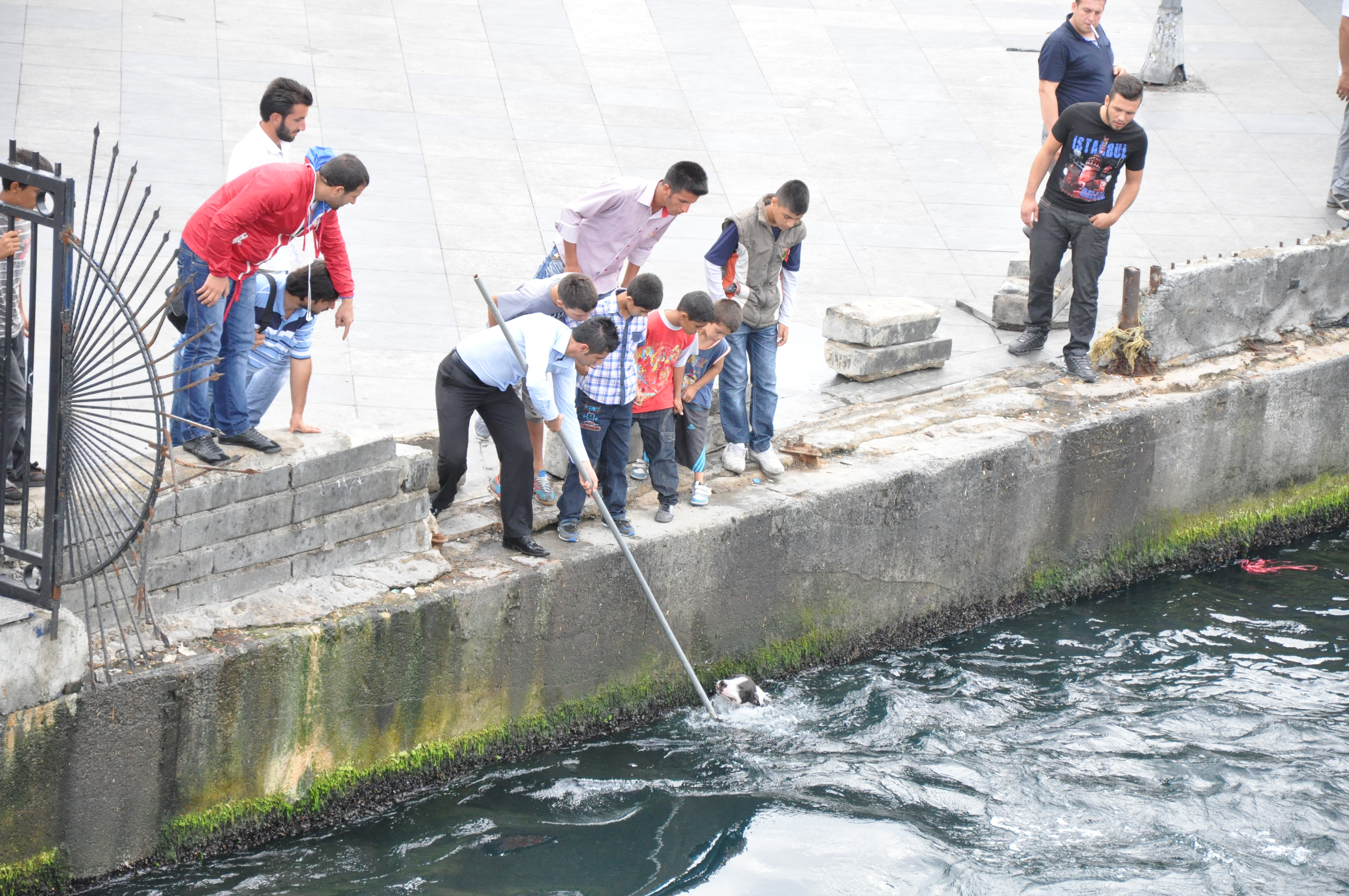
Rescuers using the "reach" method with a stick, to rescue a drowning dog in Istanbul. This approach is even more effective when rescuing people, who are able to hold onto the stick with their hands.

In emergency situations in which lifeguards or other trained personnel are not present, it is advisable to reach for the victim from land with your hand or a long stick, row to them in a boat, or throw them a flotation device, but not to enter the water (often pithily summarised as "Reach or throw, don't go.") Untrained rescuers who enter the water commonly become drowning victims themselves. The "aquatic victim-instead-of-rescuer" scenario killed 103 would-be rescuers in Australia between 1992 and 2010, and another 81 people in New Zealand between 1980 and 2012. A study of drownings in Turkey found 88 cases in which 114 would-be rescuers drowned during their attempts to rescue a primary drowning victim.

In the past, rescuers were sometimes advised to use self defence techniques to prevent them from being accidentally killed by victims' "death grip," including intentionally knocking them unconscious. This ceased to be recommended after it was found that "death grip" scenarios rarely occur and are typically not the cause of rescuer drownings, which are more often caused by the climbing reflex.

== Research and discovery ==
The common instinctual drowning behaviors were identified by Frank Pia from study of film footage of actual and near-drownings and documented in his 1971 instructional film, On Drowning, and a 1974 paper, Observations on the drowning of nonswimmers.

At the time, it was commonly believed that drowning consistently involved agitated behaviors, although Pia cites an earlier (unspecified) 1966 paper as likewise observing that this is not necessarily the case.
