= Pope Pius XIII =

Pope Pius XIII may refer to:

- Lucian Pulvermacher, pontiff, until his death in 2009, of the "true Catholic Church", a small group in the United States
- In Foul Play, a 1978 comedy/thriller film, the fictional target of an assassination
- In The Young Pope, a 2016 miniseries, the titular protagonist

== See also ==
- Pope Pius (disambiguation)
