= Pope Pius =

Pope Pius may refer to:

== Popes of the Roman Catholic Church ==
- Pope Pius I (saint; ca. 140–ca. 154; officially listed as 142/146–157/161)
- Pope Pius II (1458–1464)
- Pope Pius III (1503)
- Pope Pius IV (1559–1565)
- Pope Pius V (saint; 1566–1572)
- Pope Pius VI (1775–1799)
- Pope Pius VII (servant of God; 1800–1823)
- Pope Pius VIII (1829–1830)
- Pope Pius IX (blessed; 1846–1878)
- Pope Pius X (saint; 1903–1914)
- Pope Pius XI (1922–1939)
- Pope Pius XII (venerable; 1939–1958)

== Other people ==
- Lucian Pulvermacher (Antipope Pius XIII; 1998–2009)

=== Fictional people ===
- Pius XV, a character in the Babylon 5 universe
- Pope Pius XIII, a character in the television series The Young Pope
- Pope Pius XIII, a character in the 1978 film Foul Play
- Pope Pius XIII, a character in the book series "Vatican Knights" by Rick Jones
- Pope Pius XVI, a character in Angels & Demons by Dan Brown

== See also ==
- Pope Pius XIII (disambiguation)
- Pius (disambiguation)
- Pope (disambiguation)
