= Clement Melville Keys =

American financier (1876–1952)

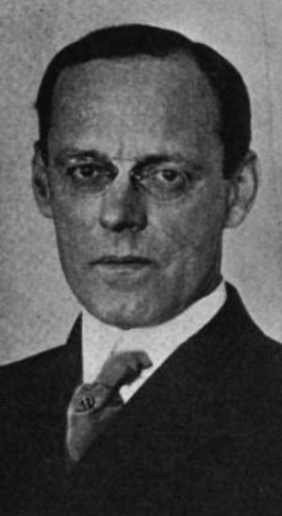
- Born: April 7, 1876; Chatsworth, Ontario, Canada
- Died: January 12, 1952 (aged 75); New York City, U.S.
- Education: University of Toronto
- Occupation: Financier

Clement Melville Keys (April 7, 1876 – January 12, 1952) was a financier who was involved in the establishment of many aviation companies including Curtiss-Wright, China National Aviation Corporation, North American Aviation and TWA. He has been called "the father of commercial aviation in America."

== Biography ==
Keys was born in Chatsworth, Ontario, on April 7, 1876, to George Keys, incumbent of St. Paul's Anglican church in the village, and Jessie Margaret Evans, the daughter of an Anglican minister. After completing secondary school in Lindsay, Ontario, he studied classics at University of Toronto, and in 1899 became an instructor in English at Ridley College in Saint Catharines, Ontario, where he began a series of Saturday morning lectures on national and world affairs. In 1901, he became a reporter for The Wall Street Journal covering the railroad beat. Later he was financial editor of the monthly journal World's Work. In 1911 Keys formed an investment counseling firm, C. M. Keys & Company.

One of Keys's former students, Casey Baldwin, had remained in contact. Baldwin and university classmate Douglas McCurdy had been involved in Alexander Graham Bell's Aerial Experiment Association, along with Thomas Selfridge and Glenn Curtiss. In 1916, Curtiss approached McCurdy for financial advice in reorganizing his company. McCurdy put Curtiss in touch with Keys, and as a result the latter became an unpaid vice-president for Curtiss Aeroplane and Motor Company. In 1920, Keys assumed controlling interest of the financially troubled company. The company merged with Wright Aeronautical in 1929 to form Curtiss-Wright with Keys as the new company's president.

In 1924, Keys invested $10,000,000 in capital to fund National Air Transport with Paul Henderson, the former Assistant Postmaster General.

In June 1929, Keys personally bought all shares of Pitcairn Aviation for 2.5 million dollars, and resold them two weeks later to North American Aviation, which was renamed to Eastern Air Transport and finally Eastern Airlines. Another venture, Transcontinental Air Transport eventually merged with Western Air Express to form Transcontinental and Western Airlines (TWA).

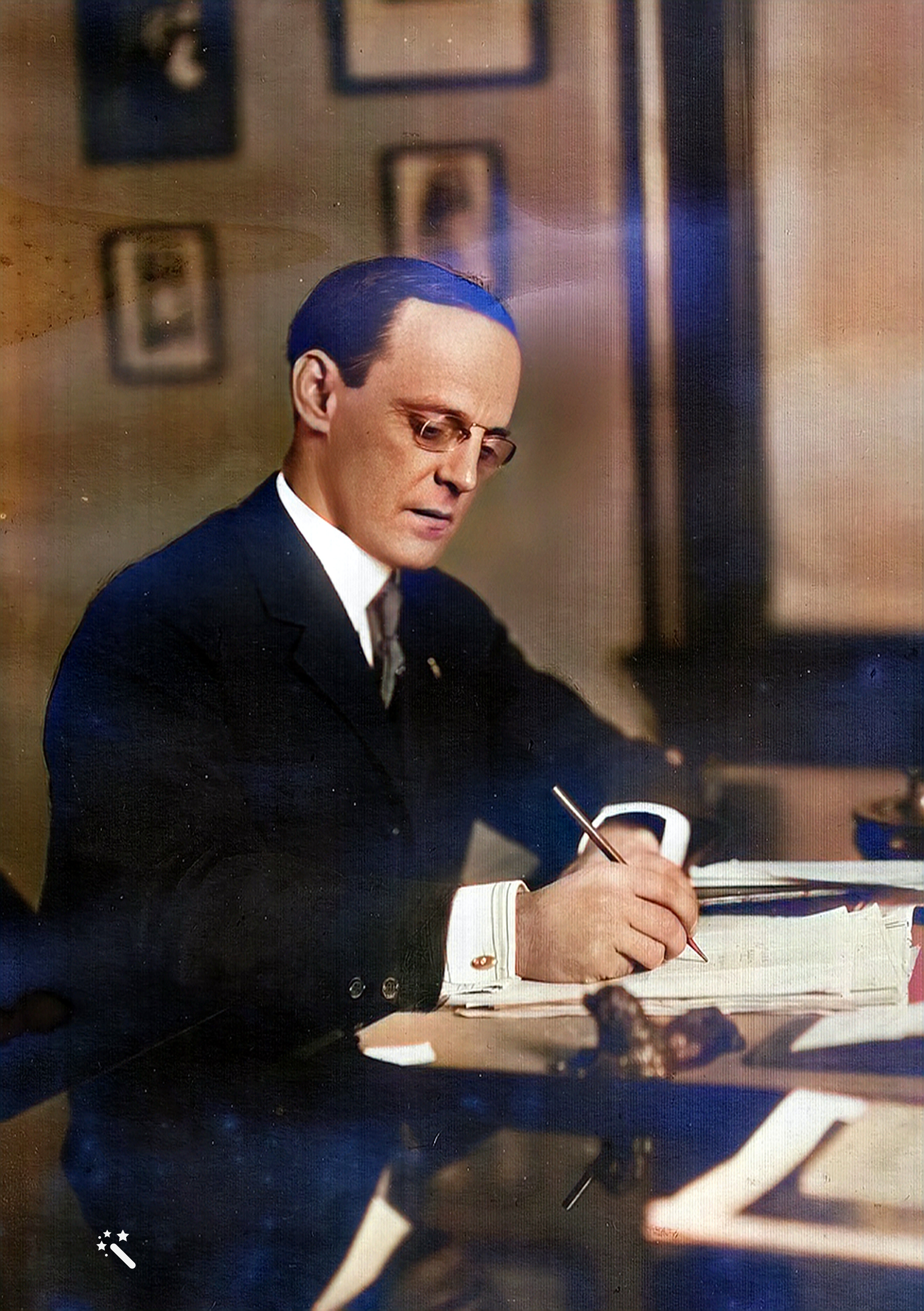
Clement Melville Keys at work ca. 1928 (colorized)

In 1928, Keys set up North American Aviation as a holding company for shares in a variety of aviation businesses. In 1929, he set up two personal holding companies Aviation Exploration Inc. and Intercontinent Aviation, through which he intended to set up joint ventures for creating airlines around the world. Aviation Exploration Inc. was the original holding company for his interests in the China National Aviation Corporation and a share in Compañía de Aviación Faucett, while through Intercontinent Aviation he organized the creation of Compañía Nacional Cubana de Aviación Curtiss in September 1929.

In 1932, Keys withdrew from the aviation business citing health reasons, but in fact the directors of North American Aviation had discovered that he had embezzled funds in order to settle personal debts incurred from his private speculation in stocks and shares. Nonetheless, he maintained his investment business. In 1942, he went back to the aviation business establishing the C. M. Keys Aircraft Service Company and after World War II helped organize Peruvian International Airways in 1947.

He died at his home in New York City on January 12, 1952.
