= PIAS =

PIAS or Pias may refer to:

- PIAS Group, a Belgian music company
  - PIAS Recordings (Play It Again Sam), an independent record label based in Brussels and owned by the PIAS Entertainment Group
- PIAS Group, a Japanese cosmetic company
- Protein inhibitor of activated STAT, a regulator of cytokine signaling
- Philadelphia International Auto Show, an annual auto show held in the city of Philadelphia, Pennsylvania

== Places ==
- Pias (Cinfães), Portugal
- Pias (Ferreira do Zêzere), Portugal
- Pias (Lousada), Portugal
- Pias (Monção), Portugal
- Pias (Serpa), Portugal

== See also ==
- Pia (disambiguation), for the singular
- Play it again, Sam (disambiguation)
