= Play it again, Sam =

Play it again, Sam may refer to:

- A misquotation of the line "Play it, Sam" from the 1942 film Casablanca.
- Play It Again, Sam (play), a 1969 Broadway play by Woody Allen
- Play It Again, Sam (film), the 1972 film based on Allen's play
- "Play It Again, Sam", a song on the album You Brainstorm, I Brainstorm, but Brilliance Needs a Good Editor by Manchester Orchestra
- A work for solo viola by Milton Babbitt, written in 1989
- Branding used by Superior Software, to re-release their old titles
- PIAS Recordings, an international record label, also known as "Play It Again Sam Records"

== See also ==
- PIAS (disambiguation)
