= PIA Planetarium, Karachi =

Planetarium in Karachi, Pakistan

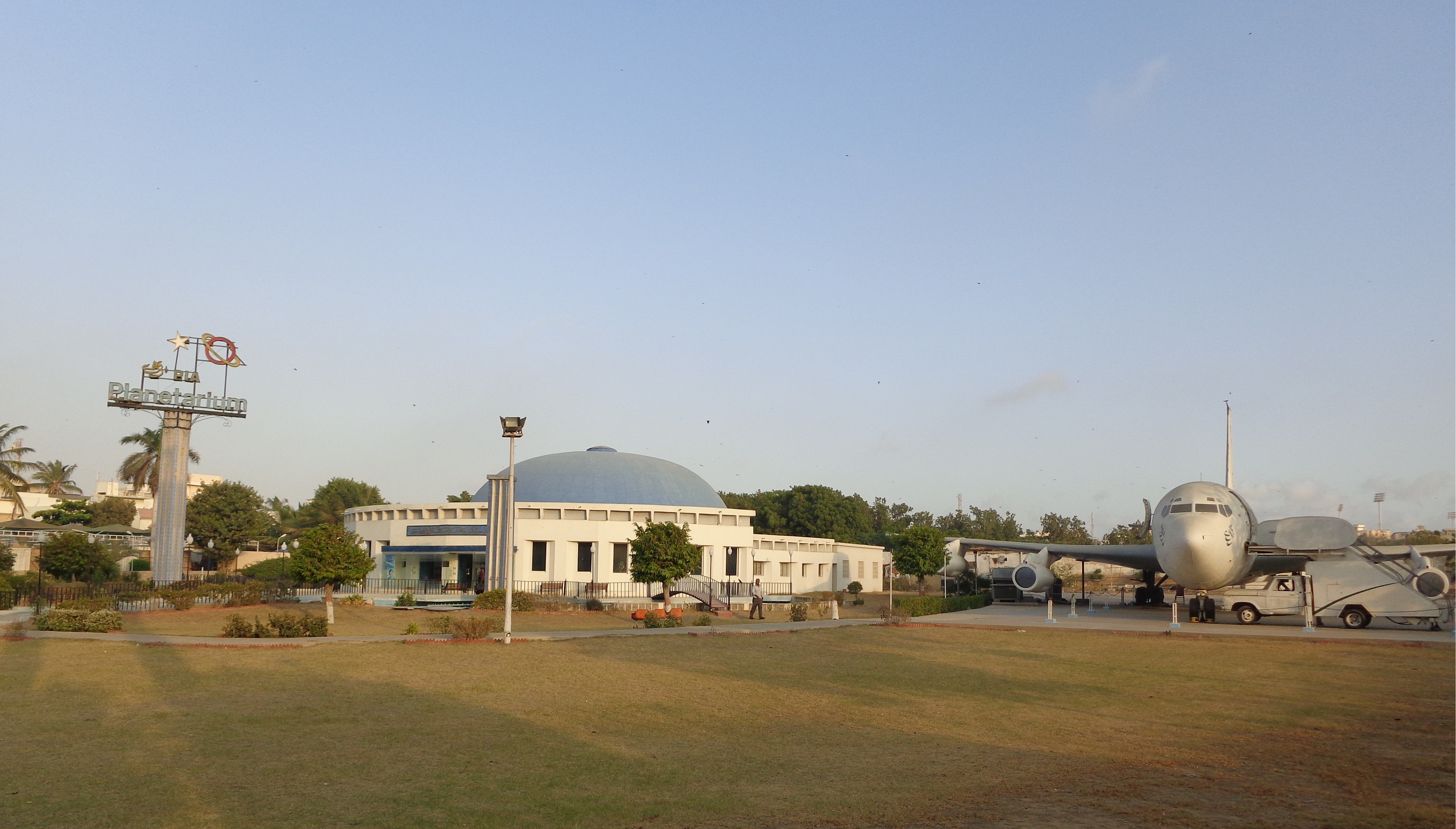
- Interactive map of the PIA Planetarium, Karachi area

General information
- Type: Planetarium
- Location: University Road near Expo Centre; Gulshan-e-Iqbal, Karachi, Sindh, Pakistan
- Completed: 1985
- Owner: Pakistan International Airlines
- Operator: Pakistan International Airlines

The PIA Planetarium, Karachi is a planetarium in the Gulshan-e-Iqbal area of Karachi, Sindh, Pakistan, on University Road near the Expo Centre. It is operated by Pakistan International Airlines (PIA) and was the first PIA-operated planetarium in Pakistan, having been established in the 1980s. The complex includes a dome-shaped projection hall and a separate aircraft exhibit.

== Site and facilities ==
The planetarium is on University Road near Expo Centre in Karachi. Its main programme is an hour-long audio-visual presentation about the universe.

== History ==
It was established in Karachi in 1985 as a public attraction for stargazing and science education. It was the first planetarium built in Pakistan.

In 2004, the future of the planetarium became uncertain when the Export Promotion Bureau sought the return of the land for expansion of the Expo Centre. PIA regarded the facility as a loss-making concern and considered either closing it or dismantling it if the government formally revoked the earlier directive under which the land had been made available. Later that month, it was announced that the planetarium might be shifted to the University of Karachi campus and incorporated into the university's Institute of Space and Planetary Astrophysics. The planetarium continued to operate after the proposed move. In 2006, the management had raised admission prices in an attempt to improve revenue at the loss-making facility, but that the number of visitors had dropped and shows were sometimes cancelled because of low turnout.

The planetarium continued to be used for public science events in the 2010s and 2020s. During World Space Week in October 2013, the Space and Upper Atmosphere Research Commission (SUPARCO) held free sky-simulation shows and lectures there for school students.

In February 2025, the Karachi Astronomers Society organised a public observation event on the planetarium's lawns to mark a planetary alignment.

== See also ==
- PIA Planetarium, Lahore
- PIA Planetarium, Peshawar
- Pakistan International Airlines
