= Ladder approach =

Aquatic lifesaving technique

The ladder approach is a widely taught lifesaving technique and is used to promote the safety of a rescuer during an aquatic rescue. The approach stresses using the least dangerous method possible during a rescue, and moving on to more dangerous options if it becomes necessary to do so.

This method can help keep the rescuer as safe as possible throughout the rescue.

== The ladder approach ==
(Safest Option)

- Talk - Try to talk the victim to safety- see if they can help themselves.
- Throw - Throw an aid to the victim
- Reach - Reach with an aid to try to help the victim
- Wade - Wade into the water and provide aid to the victim
- Row - Row out to the victim and help them into your boat/provide them with an aid
- Swim - Swim out to the victim and provide them with an aid
- Tow - Swim out to the victim and tow them back to safety using an aid
- Carry - Swim out to the victim and carry them on your back since they might be unconscious.

(Most Dangerous Option)

- Helo - This stage, representing helicopter rescue is sometimes added. This carries a wide range of different and additional risks for both rescuers and casualty.
