= Drowning =

Respiratory impairment caused by submersion in liquid

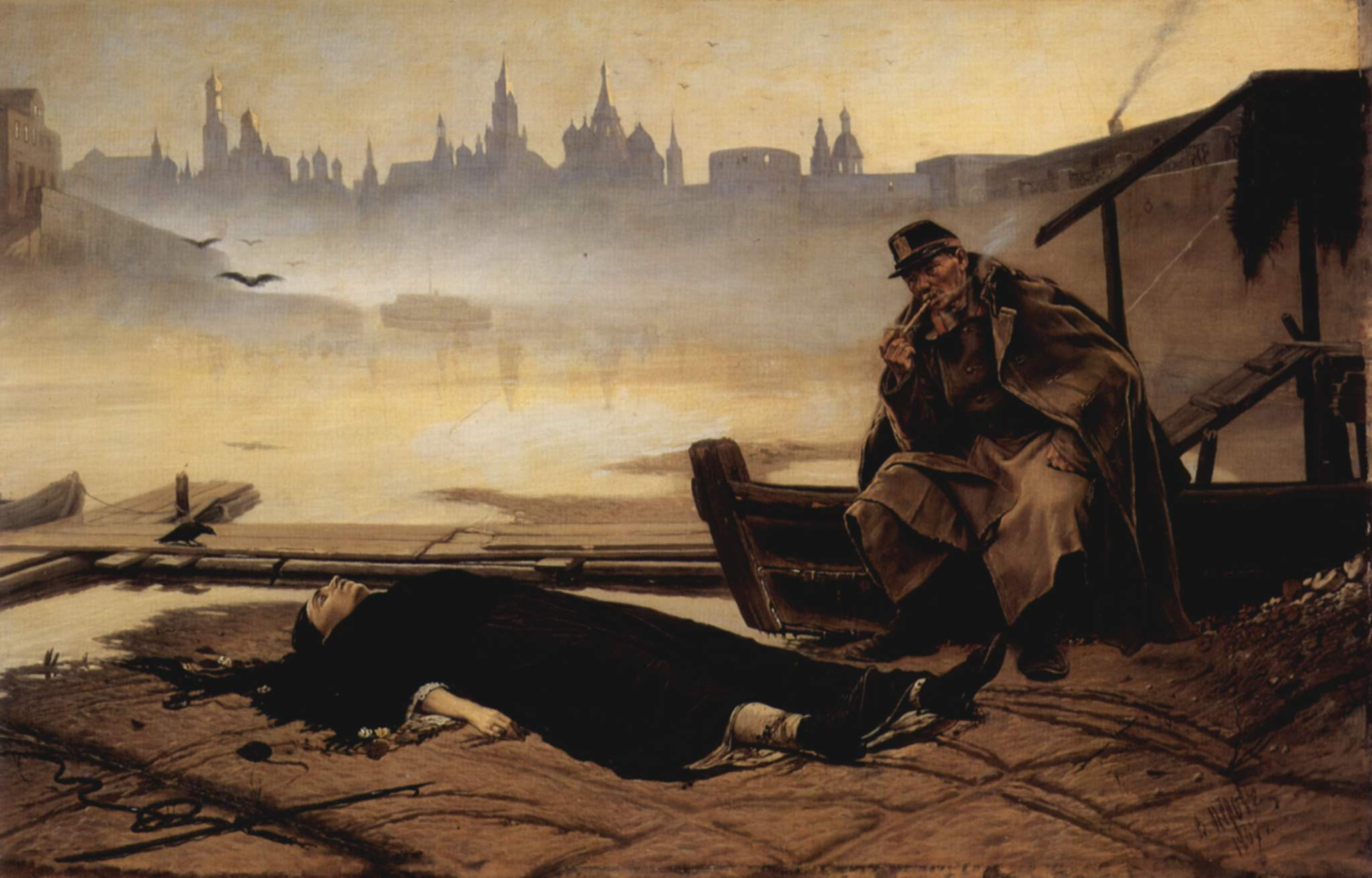
- Vasily Perov: The Drowned, 1867
- Specialty: Emergency medicine, Critical care medicine
- Symptoms: Event: Often occurs silently with a person found unconscious After rescue: Breathing problems, confusion, unconsciousness
- Complications: Hypothermia, aspiration, acute respiratory distress syndrome
- Usual onset: Rapid
- Risk factors: Alcohol use, epilepsy, access to water, cold water shock, storms
- Diagnostic method: Based on symptoms
- Differential diagnosis: Suicide, seizure, murder, hypoglycemia, heart arrhythmia
- Prevention: Fencing pools, teaching children to swim, safe boating practices
- Treatment: Rescue breathing, CPR, mechanical ventilation
- Medication: Oxygen therapy, intravenous fluids, vasopressors
- Frequency: 4.5 million (2015)
- Deaths: 300,000 (2024)

Drowning is a type of suffocation induced by the submersion of the mouth and nose in a liquid. Submersion injury refers to both drowning and near-miss incidents. Most instances of fatal drowning occur alone or in situations where others present are either unaware of the victim's situation or unable to offer assistance. After successful resuscitation, drowning victims may experience breathing problems, confusion, or unconsciousness. Occasionally, victims may not begin experiencing these symptoms until several hours after they are rescued. An incident of drowning can also cause further complications for victims due to low body temperature, aspiration, or acute respiratory distress syndrome (respiratory failure from lung inflammation).

Drowning is more likely to happen when spending extended periods near large bodies of water. Risk factors for drowning include alcohol use, drug use, epilepsy, minimal swim training or a complete lack of training, and, in the case of children, a lack of supervision. Common drowning locations include natural and man-made bodies of water, bathtubs, and swimming pools.

Drowning occurs when a person spends too much time with their nose and mouth submerged in a liquid to the point of being unable to breathe. If this is not followed by an exit to the surface, low oxygen levels and excess carbon dioxide in the blood trigger a neurological state of breathing emergency, which results in increased physical distress and occasional contractions of the vocal folds. When significant amounts of water enter the lungs, it is most often later in the process, when they irresistibly force an inhalation.

While the word "drowning" is commonly associated with fatal results, drowning may be classified into three different types: drowning that results in death, drowning that results in long-lasting health problems, and drowning that results in no health complications. Sometimes the term "near-drowning" is used in the latter cases. Among children who survive, health problems occur in about 7.5% of cases.

Steps to prevent drowning include teaching children and adults to swim and to recognise unsafe water conditions, never swimming alone, use of personal flotation devices on boats and when swimming in unfavourable conditions, limiting or removing access to water (such as with fencing of swimming pools), and exercising appropriate supervision. Treatment of victims who are not breathing should begin with opening the airway and providing five breaths of mouth-to-mouth resuscitation. Cardiopulmonary resuscitation (CPR) is recommended for a person whose heart has stopped beating and has been underwater for less than an hour.

== Causes ==
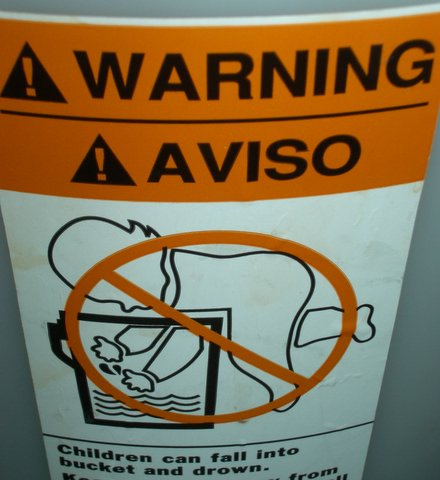
Children have drowned in buckets and toilets.

A major contributor to drowning is the inability to swim. Other contributing factors include the state of the water itself, distance from a solid footing, physical impairment, or prior loss of consciousness. Anxiety brought on by fear of drowning or water itself can lead to exhaustion, thus increasing the chances of drowning.

Approximately 90% of drownings take place in freshwater (rivers, lakes, and a relatively small number of swimming pools); the remaining 10% take place in seawater. Drownings in other fluids are rare and often related to industrial accidents. In New Zealand's early colonial history, so many settlers died while trying to cross the rivers that drowning was called "the New Zealand death".

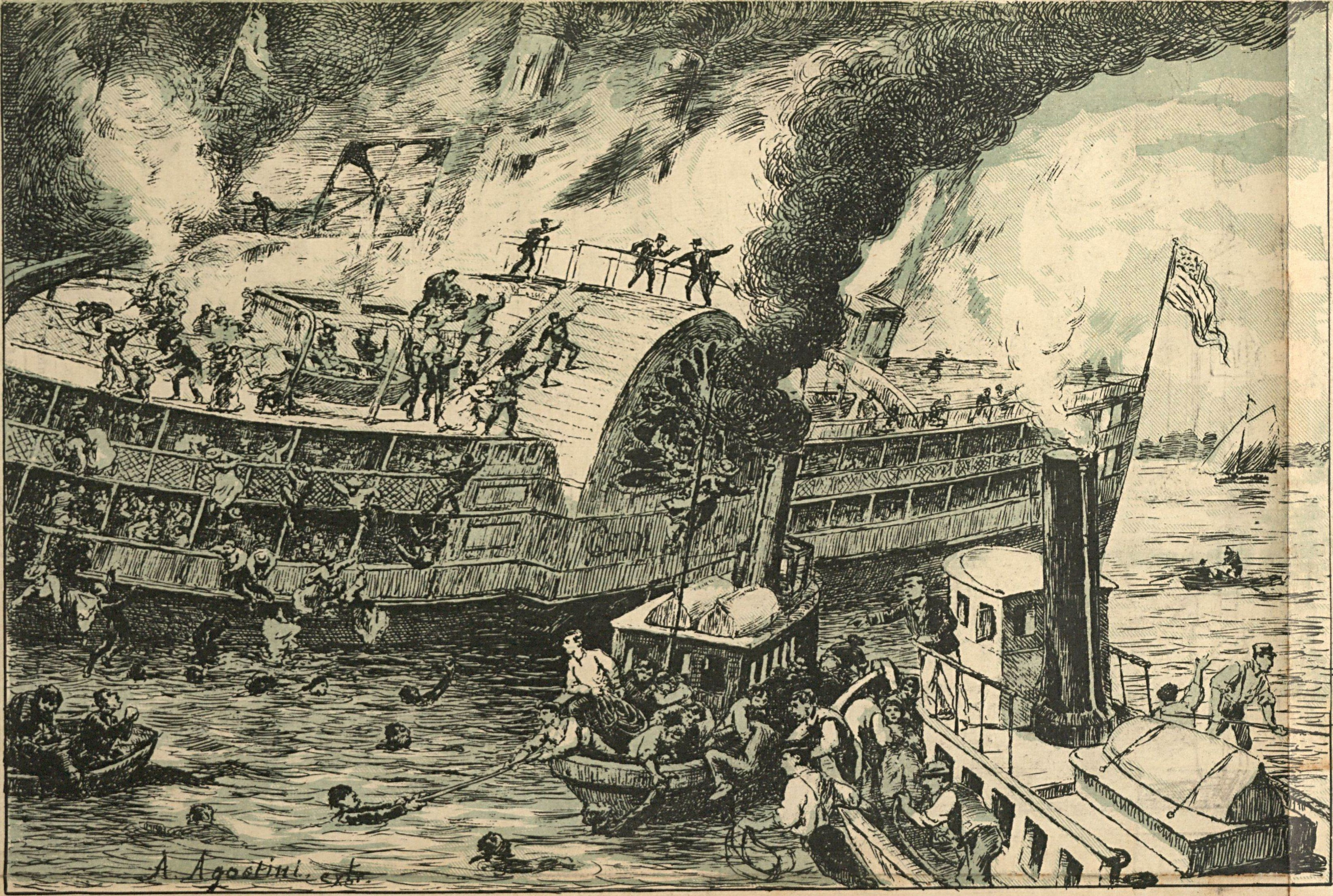
Hundreds of people drowned during the fire and sinking of the PS General Slocum in New York City in 1904

People have drowned in as little as 30 mm (1.2 in) of water while lying face down.

Death can occur as a result of complications following an initial drowning. Inhaled fluid can act as an irritant inside the lungs. Even small quantities can cause the extrusion of liquid into the lungs (pulmonary edema) over the following hours; this reduces the ability to exchange the air and can lead to a person "drowning in their own body fluid". Vomit and certain poisonous vapors or gases (as in chemical warfare) can have a similar effect. The reaction can take place up to 72 hours after the initial incident and may lead to a serious injury or death.

=== Risk factors ===
Many behavioral and physical factors are related to drowning:

- Drowning is the most common cause of death for people with seizure disorders, largely in bathtubs. Epileptics are more likely to die due to accidents such as drowning. However, this risk is especially elevated in low and middle-income countries compared to high-income countries.
- The use of alcohol increases the risk of drowning across developed and developing nations. Alcohol is involved in approximately 50% of fatal drownings, and 35% of non-fatal drownings.
- Inability to swim can lead to drowning. Participation in formal swimming lessons can reduce this risk. The optimal age to start the lessons is childhood, between one and four years of age.
- Feeling overly tired reduces swimming performance. This exhaustion can be aggravated by anxious movements motivated by fear during or in anticipation of drowning. An overconfident appraisal of one's own physical capabilities can lead to "swimming out too far" and exhaustion before returning to solid footing.
- Free access to water can be hazardous, especially to young children. Barriers can prevent young children from gaining access to the water.
- Ineffective supervision, since drowning can occur anywhere there is water, even in the presence of lifeguards.
- Risk can vary with location depending on age. Children between one and four more commonly drown in home swimming pools than elsewhere. Drownings in natural water settings increase with age. More than half of drownings occurring among those fifteen years and older occurred in natural water environments.
- Familial or genetic history of sudden cardiac arrest (SCA) or sudden cardiac death (SCD) can predispose children to drown. Extensive genetic testing and/or consultation with a cardiologist should be done when there is a high suspicion of familial history and/or clinical evidence of sudden cardiac arrest or sudden cardiac death.
- Individuals with undetected primary cardiac arrhythmias, as cold water immersion or aquatic exercise can induce these arrhythmias to occur.

Population groups at risk in the US are the old and the young.

- Youth: drowning rates are highest for children under five years of age and people fifteen to twenty-four years of age.
- Minorities: the fatal unintentional drowning rate for African Americans above the age of 29 between 1999 and 2010 was statistically significantly higher than that of white people above the age of 29. The fatal drowning rate of African American children of ages from five to fourteen is almost three times that of white children in the same age range and 5.5 times higher in swimming pools. These disparities might be associated with a lack of basic swimming education in some minority populations.

=== Freediving ===
Some additional causes of drowning can also happen during freediving activities:

- Ascent blackout, also called deep water blackout, is caused by hypoxia during ascent from depth. The partial pressure of oxygen in the lungs under pressure at the bottom of a deep free dive is adequate to support consciousness, but drops below the blackout threshold as the water pressure decreases on the ascent. It usually occurs when arriving near the surface as the pressure approaches normal atmospheric pressure.
- Shallow water blackout caused by hyperventilation prior to swimming or diving. The primary urge to breathe is triggered by rising carbon dioxide (CO_{2}) levels in the bloodstream. The body detects CO_{2} levels accurately and relies on this to control breathing. Hyperventilation reduces the carbon dioxide content of the blood but leaves the diver susceptible to a sudden loss of consciousness without warning from hypoxia. There is no bodily sensation that warns a diver of an impending blackout, and people (often capable swimmers swimming under the surface in shallow water) become unconscious and drown quietly without alerting anyone to the fact that there is a problem. They are typically found at the bottom.

== Pathophysiology ==
Drowning is split into four stages:

1. Breath-hold under voluntary control until the urge to breathe due to hypercapnia becomes overwhelming
2. Fluid is swallowed and/or aspirated into the airways
3. Cerebral anoxia stops breathing and aspiration
4. Cerebral injury due to anoxia becomes irreversible

People who do not know how to swim can struggle on the surface of the water for only 20 to 60 seconds before being submerged. In the early stages of drowning, a person holds their breath to prevent water from entering their lungs. When this is no longer possible, a small amount of water entering the trachea causes a muscular spasm that seals the airway and prevents further passage of water. If the process is not interrupted, loss of consciousness due to hypoxia is followed by cardiac arrest.

=== Oxygen deprivation ===
A conscious person will hold their breath and will try to access air, often resulting in panic, including rapid body movement. This uses up more oxygen in the bloodstream and reduces the time until unconsciousness. The person can voluntarily hold their breath for some time, but the breathing reflex will increase until the person does try to breathe, even when submerged.

The breathing reflex in the human body is weakly related to the amount of oxygen in the blood but strongly related to the amount of carbon dioxide. During an apnea, the oxygen in the body is used by the cells and excreted as carbon dioxide. Thus, the level of oxygen in the blood decreases, and the level of carbon dioxide increases. Increasing carbon dioxide levels lead to a stronger and stronger breathing reflex, up to the breath-hold breakpoint, at which the person can no longer voluntarily hold their breath. This typically occurs at an arterial partial pressure of carbon dioxide of 55 mm Hg but may differ significantly between people.

When the body is submerged into cold water, breath-holding time is significantly shorter than that in air due to the cold shock response. The breath-hold breakpoint can be suppressed or delayed, either intentionally or unintentionally. Hyperventilation before any dive, deep or shallow, flushes out carbon dioxide in the blood, resulting in a dive commencing with an abnormally low carbon dioxide level: a potentially dangerous condition known as hypocapnia. The level of carbon dioxide in the blood after hyperventilation may then be insufficient to trigger the breathing reflex later in the dive.

Following this, a blackout may occur before the diver feels an urgent need to breathe. This can occur at any depth and is common in distance breath-hold divers in swimming pools. Both deep and distance free divers often use hyperventilation to flush out carbon dioxide from the lungs to suppress the breathing reflex for longer. It is important not to mistake this for an attempt to increase the body's oxygen store. The body at rest is fully oxygenated by normal breathing and cannot take on any more. Breath-holding in water should always be supervised by a second person, as by hyperventilating, one increases the risk of shallow water blackout because insufficient carbon dioxide levels in the blood fail to trigger the breathing reflex.

A continued lack of oxygen in the brain, hypoxia, will quickly render a person unconscious, usually around a blood partial pressure of oxygen of 25–30 mmHg. In some instances, laryngospasm closes the airways, and the drowning victim is found to have gone into cardiac arrest as a result of asphyxiation without inhaling water; an unconscious person rescued with a sealed airway stands a good chance of a full recovery. Artificial respiration is also much more effective without water in the lungs. At this point, the person stands a good chance of recovery if attended to within minutes. More than 10% of drownings may involve laryngospasm, but the evidence suggests that it is not usually effective at preventing water from entering the trachea. The lack of water found in the lungs during autopsy does not necessarily mean there was no water at the time of drowning, as small amounts of freshwater are absorbed into the bloodstream. Hypercapnia and hypoxia both contribute to laryngeal relaxation, after which the airway is open through the trachea. There is also bronchospasm and mucous production in the bronchi associated with laryngospasm, and these may prevent water entry at terminal relaxation.

The hypoxemia and acidosis caused by asphyxia in drowning affect various organs. There can be central nervous system damage, cardiac arrhythmia, pulmonary injury, reperfusion injury, and multiple-organ secondary injury with prolonged tissue hypoxia.

A lack of oxygen or chemical changes in the lungs may cause the heart to stop beating. This cardiac arrest stops the flow of blood and thus stops the transport of oxygen to the brain. Cardiac arrest used to be the traditional point of death, but at this point, there is still a chance of recovery. The brain cannot survive long without oxygen, and the continued lack of oxygen in the blood, combined with the cardiac arrest, will lead to the deterioration of brain cells, causing first brain damage and eventually brain death after six minutes from which recovery is generally considered impossible. Hypothermia of the central nervous system may prolong this. In cold temperatures below 6 °C (43 °F), the brain may be cooled sufficiently to allow for a survival time of more than an hour.

The extent of central nervous system injury, to a large extent, determines the survival and long-term consequences of drowning. In the case of children, most survivors are found within 2 minutes of immersion, and most fatalities are found after 10 minutes or more.

=== Water aspiration ===
If water enters the airways of a conscious person, the person will try to cough up the water or swallow it, often inhaling more water involuntarily. When water enters the larynx or trachea, both conscious and unconscious people may experience laryngospasm, in which the vocal cords constrict, sealing the airway. This prevents water from entering the lungs. Because of this laryngospasm, in the initial phase of drowning, water enters the stomach, and very little water enters the lungs. Though laryngospasm prevents water from entering the lungs, it also interferes with breathing. In most people, the laryngospasm relaxes sometime after unconsciousness due to hypoxia in the larynx, and water can then enter the lungs, causing a "wet drowning". However, about 7–10% of people maintain this seal until cardiac arrest. This has been called "dry drowning", as no water enters the lungs. In forensic pathology, water in the lungs indicates that the person was still alive at the point of submersion. An absence of water in the lungs may be either a dry drowning or indicates a death before submersion.

Aspirated water that reaches the alveoli destroys the pulmonary surfactant, which causes pulmonary edema and decreased lung compliance, compromising oxygenation in affected parts of the lungs. This is associated with metabolic acidosis, secondary fluid, and electrolyte shifts. During alveolar fluid exchange, diatoms present in the water may pass through the alveolar wall into the capillaries to be carried to internal organs. The presence of these diatoms may be diagnostic of drowning.

Of people who have survived drowning, almost one-third will experience complications such as acute lung injury (ALI) or acute respiratory distress syndrome (ARDS). ALI/ARDS can be triggered by pneumonia, sepsis, and water aspiration. These conditions are life-threatening disorders that can result in death if not treated promptly. During drowning, aspirated water enters the lung tissues, causes a reduction in pulmonary surfactant, obstructs ventilation, and triggers a release of inflammatory mediators which results in hypoxia. Specifically, upon reaching the alveoli, hypotonic liquid found in freshwater dilutes pulmonary surfactant, destroying the substance. Comparatively, aspiration of hypertonic seawater draws liquid from the plasma into the alveoli and similarly causes damage to surfactant by disrupting the alveolar-capillary membrane. Still, there is no clinical difference between salt and freshwater drowning. Once someone has reached definitive care, supportive care strategies such as mechanical ventilation can help to reduce the complications of ALI/ARDS.

Whether a person drowns in freshwater or salt water makes no difference in respiratory management or its outcome. People who drown in freshwater may experience worse hypoxemia early in their treatment; however, this initial difference is short-lived.

=== Cold-water immersion ===
Submerging the face in water cooler than about 21 °C (70 °F) triggers the diving reflex, common to air-breathing vertebrates, especially marine mammals such as whales and seals. This reflex protects the body by putting it into energy-saving mode to maximise the time it can stay underwater. The strength of this reflex is greater in colder water and has three principal effects:

- Bradycardia, a slowing of the heart rate to less than 60 beats per minute.
- Peripheral vasoconstriction, the restriction of the blood flow to the extremities to increase the blood and oxygen supply to the vital organs, especially the brain.
- Blood shift, the shifting of blood to the thoracic cavity, the region of the chest between the diaphragm and the neck, to avoid the collapse of the lungs under higher pressure during deeper dives.

The reflex action is automatic and allows both a conscious and an unconscious person to survive longer without oxygen underwater than in a comparable situation on dry land. The exact mechanism for this effect has been debated and may be a result of brain cooling similar to the protective effects seen in people who are treated with deep hypothermia.

The actual cause of death in cold or very cold water is usually lethal bodily reactions to increased heat loss and to freezing water, rather than any loss of core body temperature. Of those who die after plunging into freezing seas, around 20% die within 2 minutes from cold shock (uncontrolled rapid breathing and gasping causing water inhalation, a massive increase in blood pressure and cardiac strain leading to cardiac arrest, and panic), another 50% die within 15 – 30 minutes from cold incapacitation (loss of use and control of limbs and hands for swimming or gripping, as the body 'protectively' shuts down the peripheral muscles of the limbs to protect its core), and exhaustion and unconsciousness cause drowning, claiming the rest within a similar time. A notable example of this occurred during the sinking of the Titanic, in which most people who entered the −2 °C (28 °F) water died within 15–30 minutes.

[S]omething that almost no one in the maritime industry understands. That includes mariners [and] even many (most) rescue professionals: It is impossible to die from hypothermia in cold water unless you are wearing flotation, because without flotation – you won't live long enough to become hypothermic.

— Mario Vittone, lecturer and author in water rescue and survival

Submersion into cold water can induce cardiac arrhythmias (abnormal heart rates) in healthy people, sometimes causing strong swimmers to drown. The physiological effects caused by the diving reflex conflict with the body's cold shock response, which includes a gasp and uncontrollable hyperventilation leading to aspiration of water. While breath-holding triggers a slower heart rate, cold shock activates tachycardia, an increase in heart rate. It is thought that this conflict of these nervous system responses may account for the arrhythmias of cold water submersion.

Heat transfers very well into water, and body heat is therefore lost quickly in water compared to air, even in 'cool' swimming waters around 70 °F (~20 °C). A water temperature of 10 °C (50 °F) can lead to death in as little as one hour, and water temperatures hovering at freezing can lead to death in as little as 15 minutes. This is because cold water can have other lethal effects on the body. Hence, hypothermia is not usually a reason for drowning or the clinical cause of death for those who drown in cold water.

Upon submersion into cold water, remaining calm and preventing loss of body heat is paramount. While awaiting rescue, swimming or treading water should be limited to conserve energy, and the person should attempt to remove as much of the body from the water as possible; attaching oneself to a buoyant object can improve the chance of survival should unconsciousness occur.

Most people who experience cold-water drowning do not develop hypothermia quickly enough to decrease cerebral metabolism before ischemia and irreversible hypoxia occur. The neuroprotective effects appear to require water temperatures below about 5 °C (41 °F).

== Diagnosis ==
The World Health Organization in 2005 defined drowning as "the process of experiencing respiratory impairment from submersion/immersion in liquid." This definition does not imply death or even the necessity for medical treatment after removing the cause, nor that any fluid enters the lungs. The WHO classifies this as death, morbidity, and no morbidity. There was also consensus that the terms wet, dry, active, passive, silent, and secondary drowning should no longer be used.

Experts differentiate between distress and drowning.

- Distress – people in trouble, but who can still float, signal for help, and take action.
- Drowning – people suffocating and in imminent danger of death within seconds.

=== Forensics ===
Forensic diagnosis of drowning is considered one of the most difficult in forensic medicine. External examination and autopsy findings are often nonspecific, and the available laboratory tests are often inconclusive or controversial. The purpose of an investigation is to distinguish whether the death was due to immersion or whether the body was immersed postmortem. The mechanism in acute drowning is hypoxemia and irreversible cerebral anoxia due to submersion in liquid.

Drowning would be considered a possible cause of death if the body was recovered from a body of water, near a fluid that could plausibly have caused drowning, or found with the head immersed in a fluid. A medical diagnosis of death by drowning is generally made after other possible causes of death have been excluded by a complete autopsy and toxicology tests. Indications of drowning are unambiguous and may include bloody froth in the airway, water in the stomach, cerebral edema and petrous or mastoid hemorrhage. Some evidence of immersion may be unrelated to the cause of death, and lacerations and abrasions may have occurred before or after immersion or death.

Diatoms should normally never be present in human tissue unless water was aspirated. Their presence in tissues such as bone marrow suggests drowning; however, they are present in soil and the atmosphere, and samples may be contaminated. An absence of diatoms does not rule out drowning, as they are not always present in water. A match of diatom shells to those found in the water may provide supporting evidence of the place of death. Drowning in saltwater can leave different concentrations of sodium and chloride ions in the left and right chambers of the heart, but they will dissipate if the person survived for some time after the aspiration, or if CPR was attempted, and have been described in other causes of death.

Most autopsy findings relate to asphyxia and are not specific to drowning. The signs of drowning are degraded by decomposition. Large amounts of froth will be present around the mouth and nostrils and in the upper and lower airways in freshly drowned bodies. The volume of froth is much greater in drowning than from other origins. Lung density may be higher than normal, but normal weights are possible after cardiac arrest or vasovagal reflex. The lungs may be overinflated and waterlogged, filling the thoracic cavity. The surface may have a marbled appearance, with darker areas associated with collapsed alveoli interspersed with paler aerated areas. Fluid trapped in the lower airways may block the passive collapse that is normal after death. Hemorrhagic bullae of emphysema may be found. These are related to the rupture of alveolar walls. These signs, while suggestive of drowning, are not conclusive.

== Prevention ==
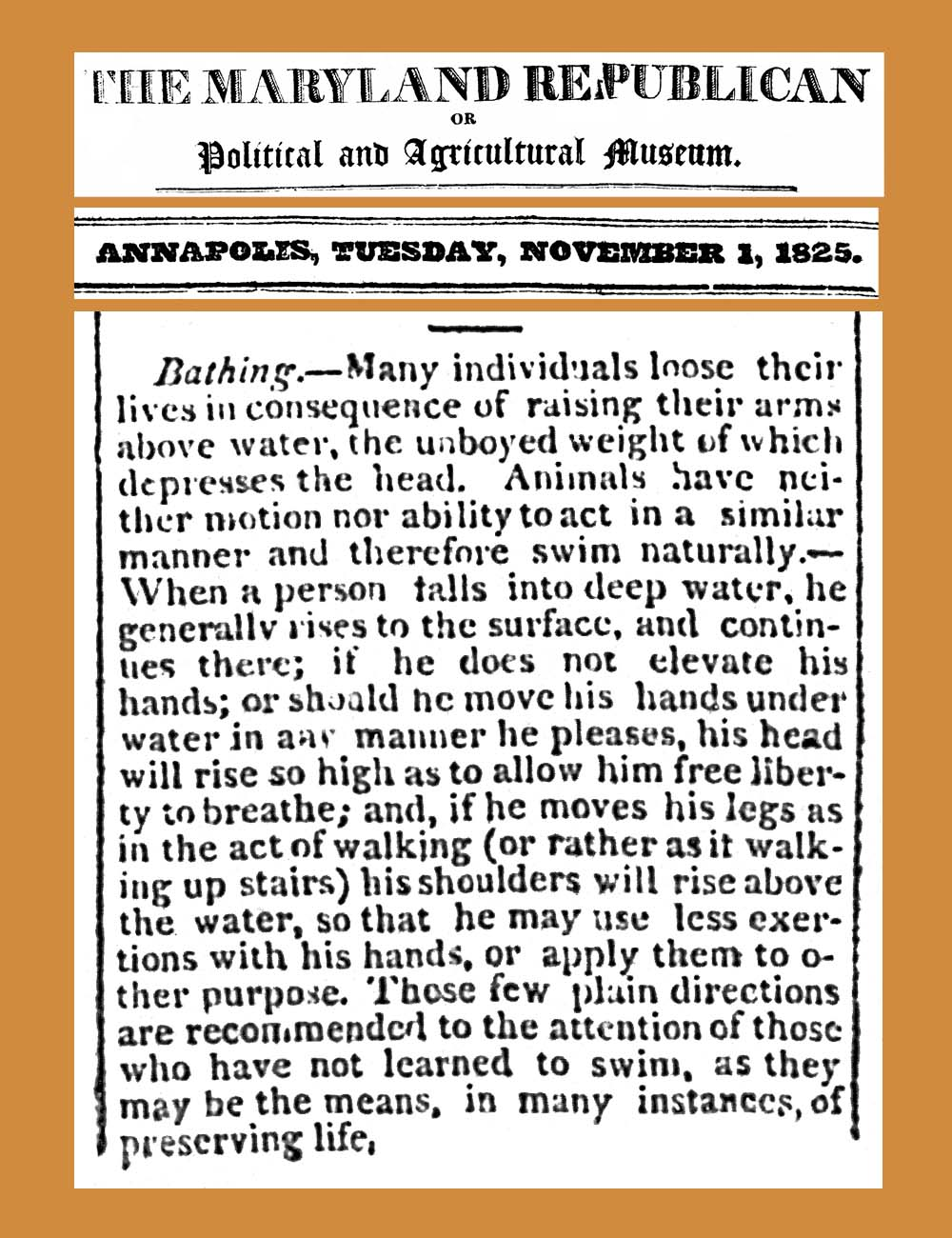
This 1825 newspaper article explains how keeping limbs beneath the water surface provides buoyancy, and describes treading water.

It is estimated that more than 85% of drownings could be prevented by supervision, training in water skills, technology, and public education. Measures that help to prevent drowning include the following:

- Learning to swim: Being able to swim is one of the most recommended methods against drowning. It is recommended that children learn to swim in a safe and supervised environment when they are between 1 and 4 years old, but learning to swim is recommended at any age.
- Surveillance: The surveillance of swimmers, especially children, is essential, because drownings may be silent and go unnoticed. A drowning person may be unable to wave, shout or even speak, and remain below the surface or unconscious. The highest rates of drowning globally are among children under five years-old. People who already know how to swim could need certain surveillance too. Many pools and bathing areas have lifeguards or a drowning detection system, and local legislation may require surveillance methods. Non-professional bystanders are important in detecting and notifying drownings. Lifeguards can be called by mobile phone in many cases. Evidence shows that alarms in pools are unreliable. The World Health Organization recommends that the most crowded hours be addressed by increasing the number of lifeguards at those times.

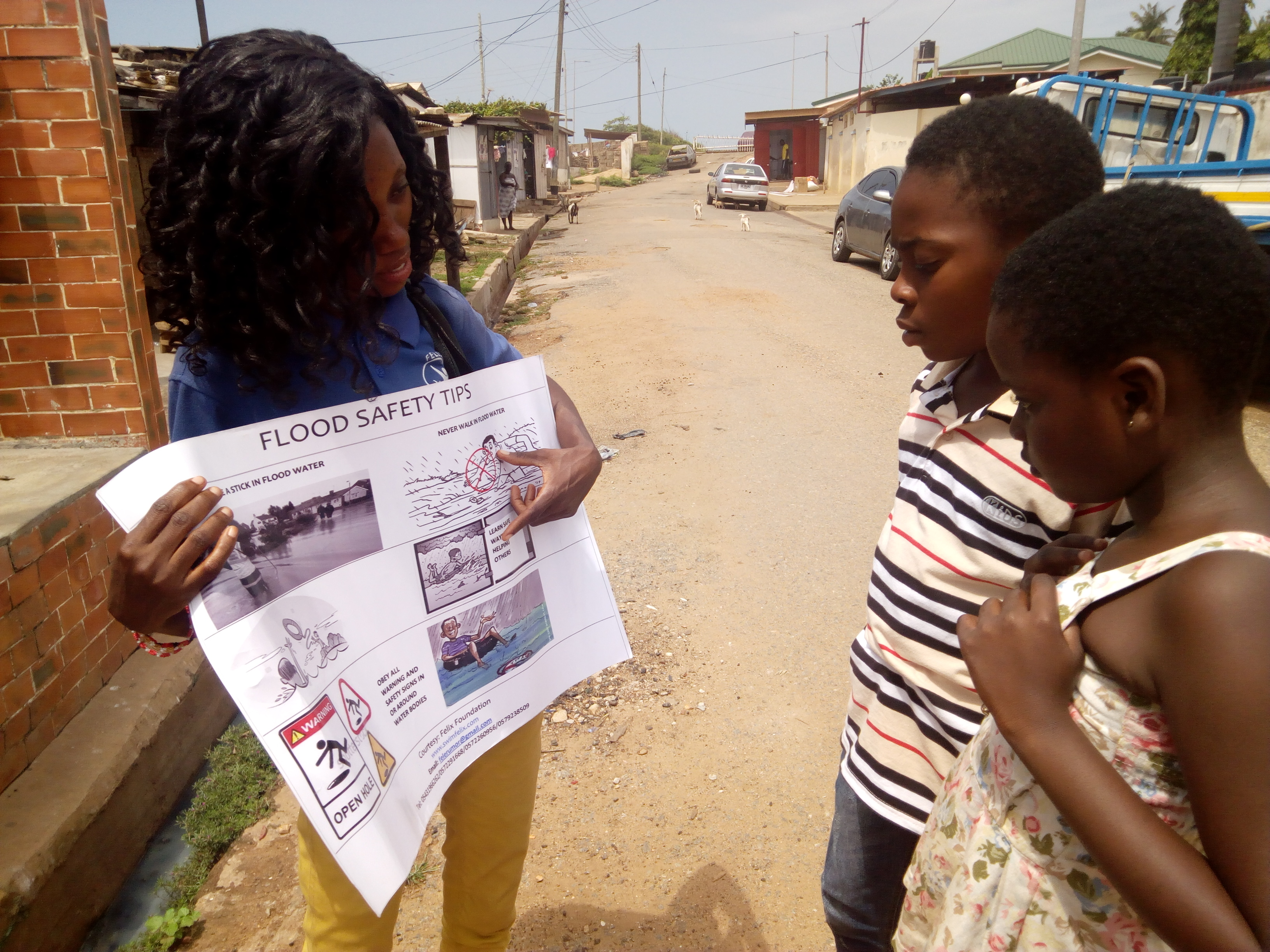
A prevention-of-drowning campaign in Ghana

- Education and awareness: The WHO recommends wide training of the public in first aid, including cardiopulmonary resuscitation (CPR), and to behave safely in the water. Swimmers need to understand how to swim within their own abilities with regard to currents, depth, temperature or waves, and to be informed of the state of the sea. Even good swimmers may drown due to hazardous water conditions and other circumstances, so it is recommended that everyone learns how to select safe places to swim that have surveillance, to understand the local conditions, and to follow the rules. Many people who drown fail to follow the local safety guidelines or pay attention to signs indicating swimming restrictions and lifeguard duties.
- Shallow water and obstructions: Local conditions may include shallow water and obstructions. It is not prudent to jump into the water without knowing the depth, especially if entering head-first. Between 1.2% and 22% of all spinal injuries are from accidents diving into shallow water or hitting hidden obstructions such as submerged trees. Up to 21% of shallow-water diving accidents cause spinal injury, risking permanent paralysis, or death.
- Alcohol and drugs: Alcohol and drugs increase the risk of drowning, and this risk increases for bars near water and parties on boats. For example, Finland sees several alcohol-implicated drownings every year at the Midsummer weekend as Finns celebrate in and around lakes and beaches.
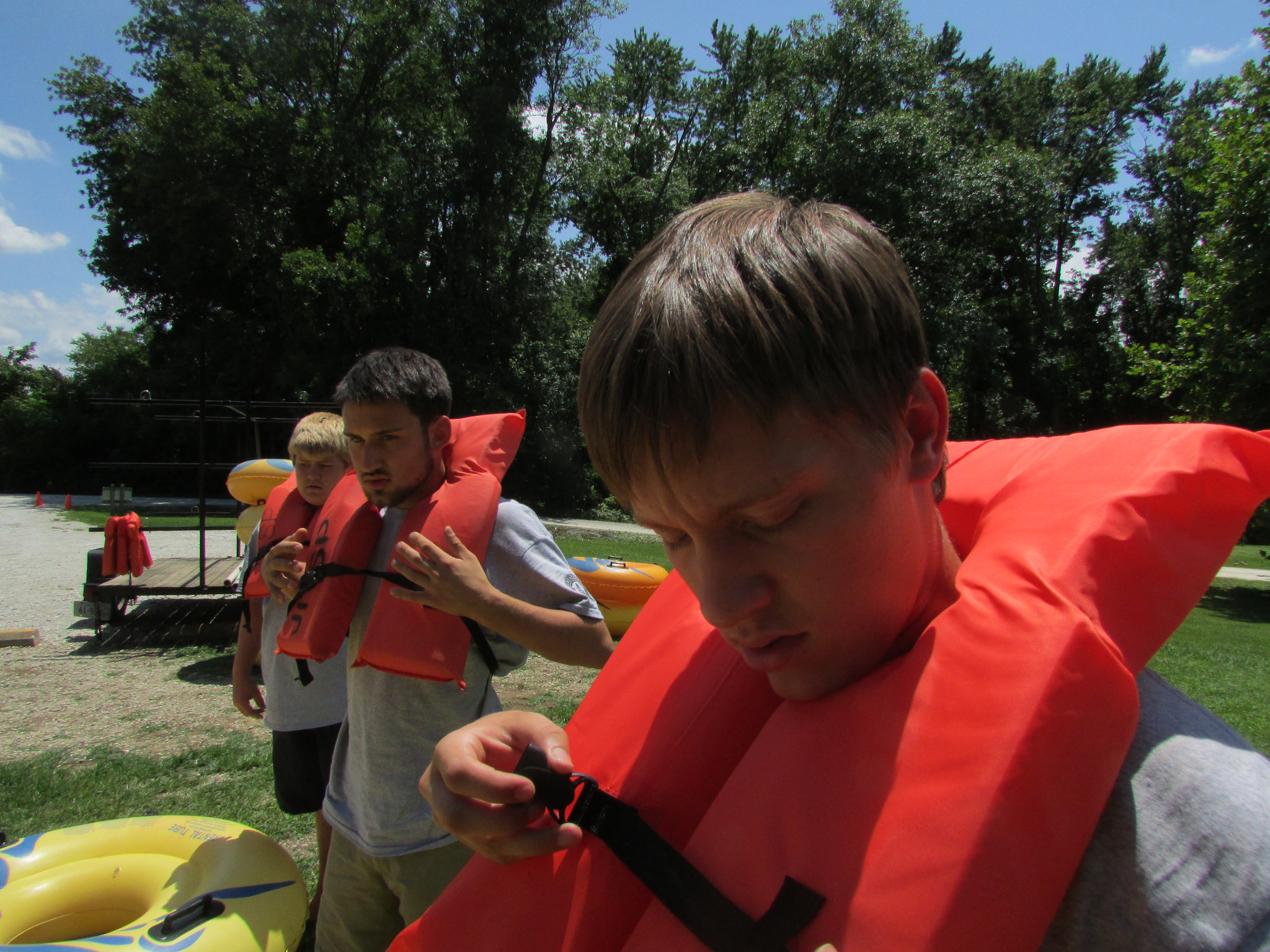
  Lifejacket
- Anxiety and panic in water: The anxious movements produced by fear during drowning can render swimmers exhausted. Additionally, underestimating one's own stamina can cause a situation in which the swimmer finds themselves too exhausted to exit the water. Reducing the rhythm of swimming can mitigate the chances of suffering a cramp or contracture (muscle spasm), it is recommended to keep calm, move towards the shore (or pool's border), and ask for help if necessary. The stings of forms of marine life can also produce panic, but after receiving a sting of most types, it is possible to get out of the water without serious problems, even if some pain appears. For most swimming problems, it can be useful to assume a horizontal position in the water, facing up, because it can reduce the effort required to float.
- Awareness of medical conditions: Some medical conditions, such as epilepsy, syncope, cramps or seizures, demand caution when in water, or near water. They may require controlled conditions for swimming (and even washing) and a good understanding of the individual's limitations.
- State of the water: It is recommended to be aware of turbulences, dangerous waves, undertow, wind and weather conditions, dangerous animals, and water temperature. Currents of water (as river currents and sea rip currents) can carry the swimmers away with great force, so authorities in safety often recommend to the users of swimming areas avoiding useless efforts in the opposite direction, but, instead, taking some advantage of the current direction while swimming or floating outwards.
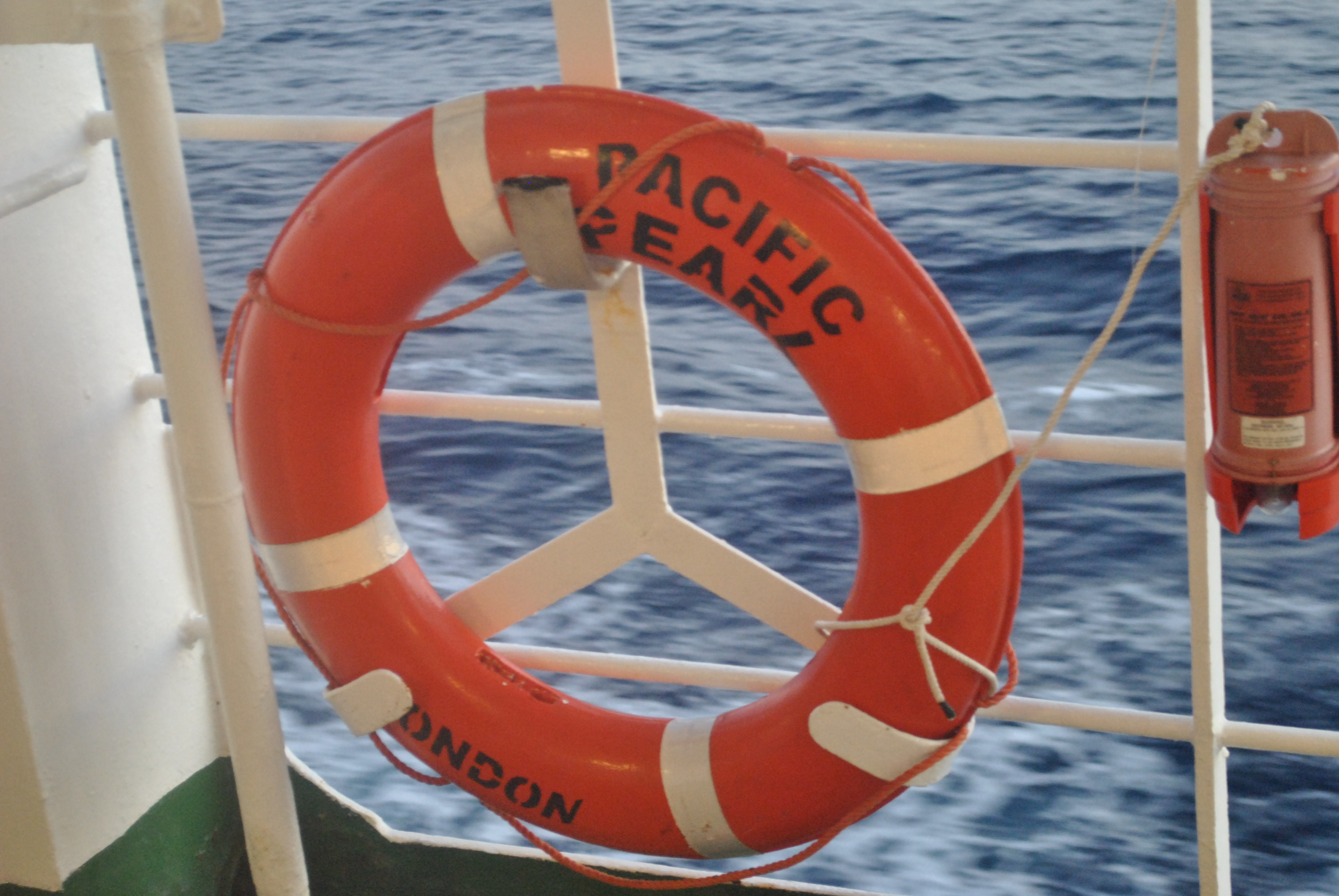
  Lifebuoy on a boat
- Safety equipment: All boats and pools must be equipped with adequate safety equipment, such as lifejackets or lifebuoys; often this is a regulatory requirement. Any recreational activity on a boat or near water requires that a lifejacket be worn, especially by children who cannot swim and others at risk of drowning. Lifejackets must be well-fitting and properly fastened, and their wearers must understand that they have to jump into water with one of them, and use it by fastening the strap properly and grabbing the front neck area with both hands. Emergency flotation equipment, such as a circular lifebuoy, can be thrown to the swimmer if available, but, if not, any other flotation device, including inner tubes, water wings or foam tubes, can be used.
- Navigation safety: Navigation accidents are a cause of drowning that can be prevented staying informed about the state of the sea, having the proper safety instruments (especially lifejackets on board, as mentioned before) and with any other advisable measure that can be applied.
- Rescue robots and drones: Remote-controlled devices may assist a water rescue. Floating rescue robots can navigate to the victim to hold on to and even help to recover them. Aerial drones are fast, can help locate victims, and even drop life jackets.
- Swimming in pairs ("buddy system"): Pairing up swimmers, so they keep surveillance of each other, and are available to help in case of any problem (because of a purpose of safety, not for competitive reasons).
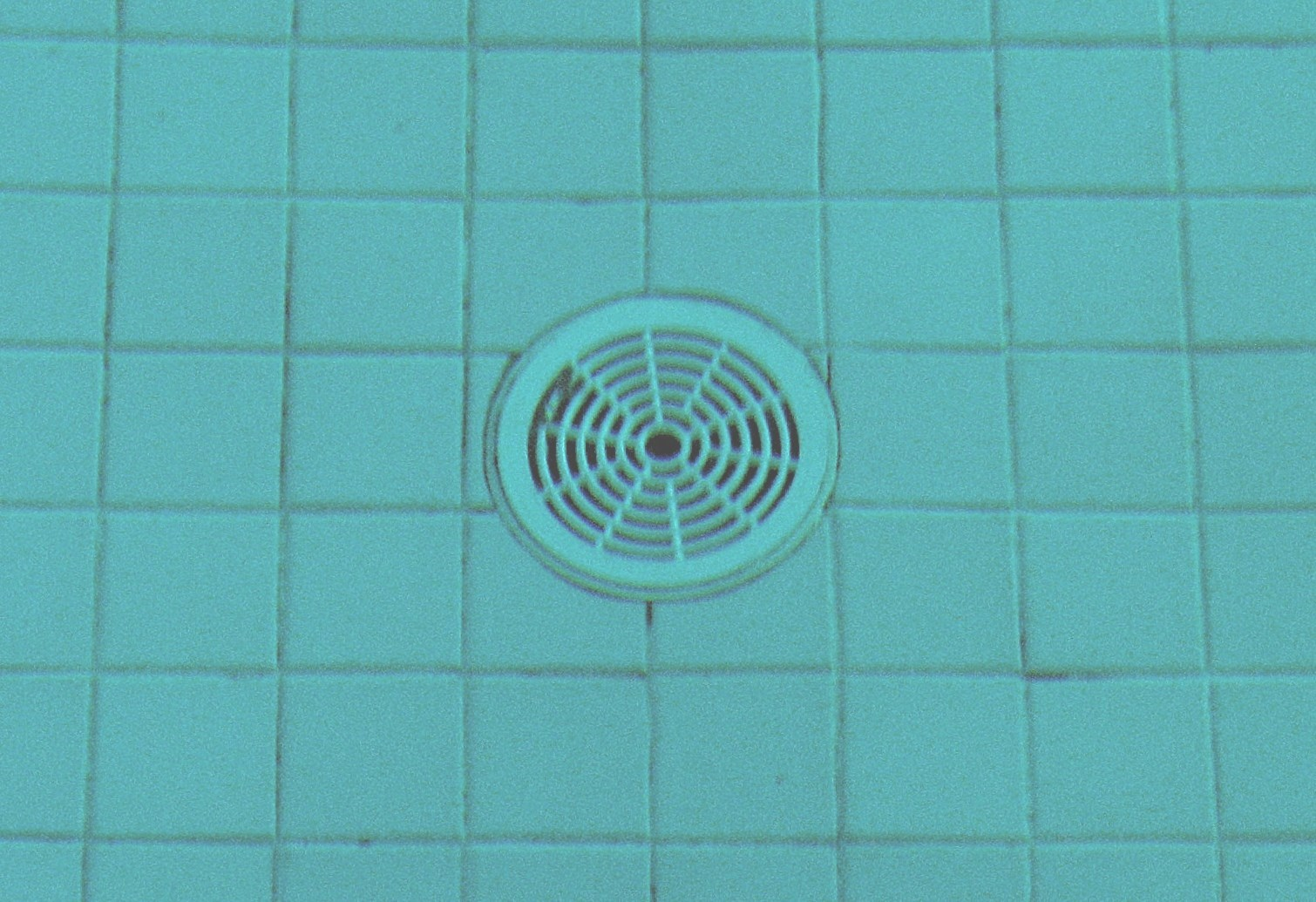
- Drain hole in a pool
  Pool fencing: Every private and public swimming pool should be fully fenced, with child-proof latches on the gates. Many countries, including most Australian states since 1998 and France since 2003, require the fencing of pools. Objects (such as toys and others) can attract children to the water.
- Pool drains: Swimming pools may have filtration systems that circulate the water. Filtration drains without covers, or too strong, can injure swimmers by trapping hair or other parts of the body, leading to immobilization and drowning. Many small drainage holes are usually preferred to a single large one. Periodic inspections can check that the system is safe.
- Paying heed to warning signs, flags and advices: Because they indicate the safety of swimming and warn about any danger.

== Water safety ==
The concept of water safety involves the procedures and policies that are directed to prevent people from drowning or from becoming injured in water.

== Time limits ==
The time a person can safely stay underwater depends on many factors, including energy consumption, number of prior breaths, physical condition, and age. An average person can last between one and three minutes before falling unconscious and around ten minutes before dying. In an unusual case with the best conditions, a person was resuscitated after 65 minutes underwater.

== Management ==
=== Rescue ===
When a person is drowning or a swimmer becomes missing, a fast water rescue may become necessary, to take that person out of the water as soon as possible. Drowning is not necessarily violent or loud, with splashing and cries; it can be silent.

==== From ground ====
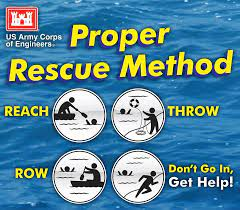
Advice given to would-be rescuers of a drowning victim

Rescuers should avoid endangering themselves unnecessarily; whenever it is possible, they should assist from a safe ground position, such as a boat, a pier, or any patch of land near the victim. The fastest way to assist is to throw a buoyant object (such as a lifebuoy or a broad branch). It is very important to avoid aiming directly at the victim, since even the lightest lifebuoys weight over 2 kilograms, and can stun, injure or even render a person unconscious if they impact on the head. Another way to assist is to reach the victim with an object to grasp, and then pull both of them out of the water. Some examples include: ropes, oars, broad branches, poles, one's own arm, a hand, etc. This carries the risk of the rescuer being pulled into the water by the victim, so the rescuer must take a firm stand, lying down, as well as securing to some stable point. Any rescue with vehicles would have to avoid trampling or damaging the victim in another manner. Also, there are modern flying drones that can drop life jackets.

Bystanders should immediately call for help. A lifeguard should be called, if present. If not, an emergency telephone number should be contacted as soon as possible, to get the help of professionals and paramedics. In some cases of drowning, victims have been rescued by professionals from a boat or a helicopter. Less than 6% of people rescued by lifeguards need medical attention, and only 0.5% need CPR. The statistics worsen when rescues are made by bystanders.

If lifeguards or paramedics are unable to be called, bystanders must rescue the drowning person. It can be done using vehicles that the victim can reach, as rowboats or even modern robots, when they navigate across the water.

==== By swimming ====
A human rescue by swimming carries a risk for the rescuer, who could be drowned trying it. Death of the would-be rescuer can happen because of the water conditions, the instinctive drowning response of the victim, the physical effort, and other problems.

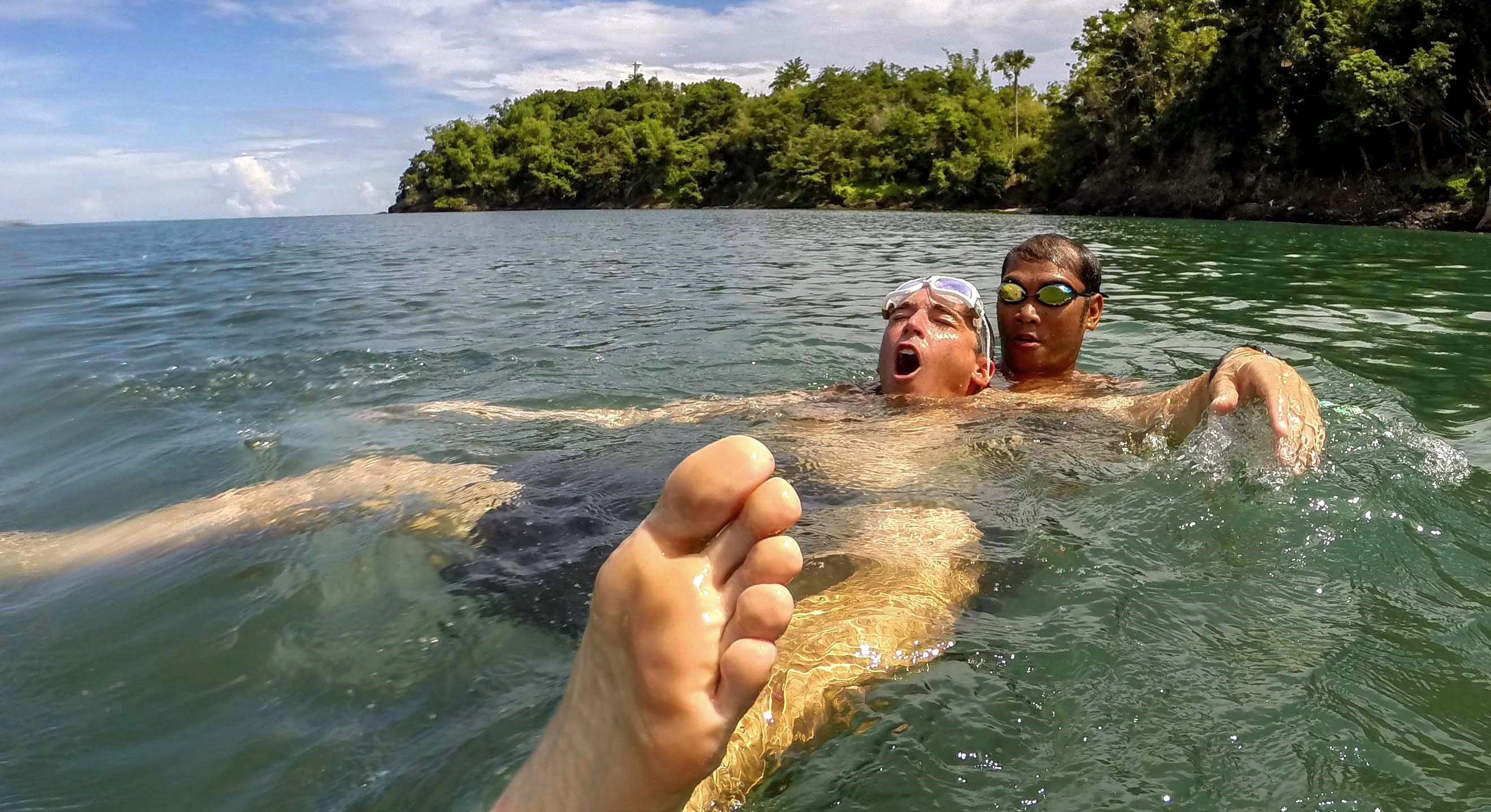
Water rescue simulation. After controlling the position of a victim (most dangerous part when the victim is anxious), the rescuer tows him from behind. It is recommended to carry a flotation object for making the rescue easier.

First contact and gripping

In a swimming intervention, it is recommended to carry a floating object that makes the rescue easier. That is especially important at the moment when the rescuer reaches the victim's area, because a drowning person in distress could cling to the rescuer in an attempt to stay above the water surface, which could sink both of them. In more affordable situations, the victim is exhausted, or has suffered a cramp, and stays calmer or fainted. But, in the worst cases, the victim will be anxious and with vigor. Then, the rescuer can approach the panicking person offering an object for flotation (as a rescue buoy), or any other, or even a hand, so the victim has something to grasp. In other situations, an expert rescuer could take one of the victim's arms and press it against the victim's back to restrict unnecessary movement. Communication is also important for coordination and allowing the rescue maneuvers.

If the victim clings to the rescuer, and there is not any flotation object, and the rescuer cannot control the situation (by simple communication, or by immobilizing, or by getting rid of the victim), a possibility is to dive underwater (as drowning people tend to move in the opposite direction, seeking the water surface) and consider a different approach to help the drowning victim.

Ascending an already sunk victim to the water surface

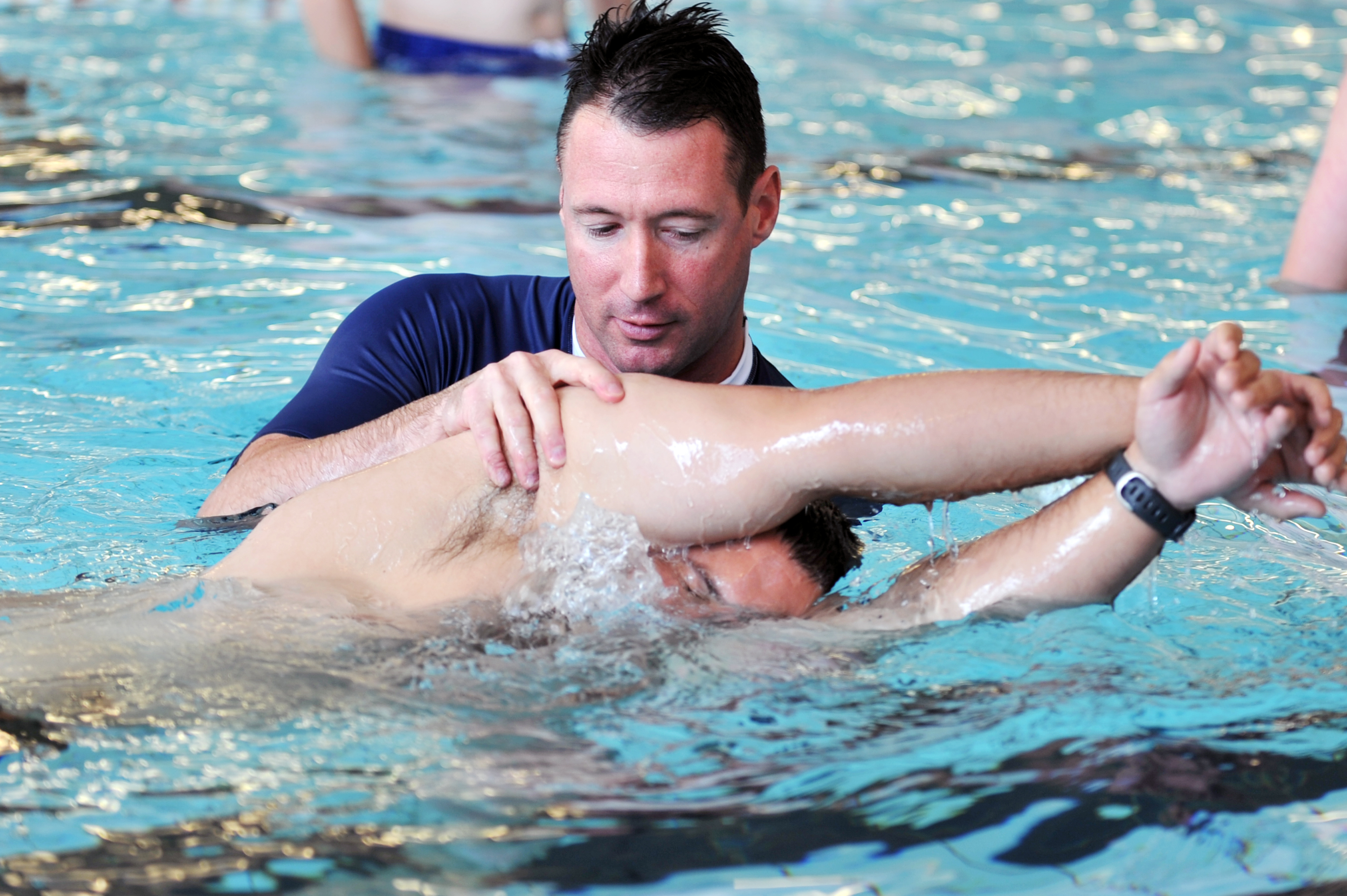
'Head splint' grip: victim's arms are grabbed between elbows and shoulders and pressed around the victims' ears. Many rescuers use it to hold the neck position of victims of spinal injury while carrying them to the water surface with a diagonal dive. Some injured victims can cling dangerously to the rescuer.

Sometimes, the victim is already sunk beneath the water surface. If this has happened, the rescue requires caution, as the victim could be conscious and cling to the rescuer underwater desperately. Victims with suspected serious spinal injuries (which limit the movements) would need special care and specific grips to be ascended properly.

In the best of cases, the sunk victim is unconscious, floating shallowly under the water surface, and can be lifted to the surface by grabbing either (or both) of the victim's arms and swimming, which pulls forward and upward, making the task easier (and enticing the victim to move). After reaching the water surface, a victim will always have to be placed in a face-up horizontal position, or at least in any other position with nose and mouth above the water, to be towed to firm ground.

When a victim is located deeper underwater, the rescuer should dive, take the victim from behind, and ascend vertically to the water surface holding the victim.

Moving a victim out of the water by towing

After a successful first physical contact with the victim (usually the most dangerous part, because victims can cling anxiously to the rescuers), the victim must be taken out of the water to a firm ground. This is achieved by a towing maneuver. It would be commonly a 'supporting tow': placing the victim body in a face-up horizontal position, and passing one hand under the victim's armpit to then grab the jaw with it, and towing by swimming backwards. The victim's mouth and nose must be kept above the water surface.

If the person is cooperative, the towing may be done in a similar fashion with the hands going under the victim's armpits. Other styles of towing are possible, but all of them keeping the victim's mouth and nose above the water.

Unconscious people may be pulled in an easier way: pulling on a wrist, or on the neck area of the shirt, while they are in a face-up horizontal position. Victims with suspected spinal injuries can require a more specific grip, and special care for their management, and a backboard (spinal board) may be needed for their rescue.

For unconscious people, an in-water resuscitation could increase the chances of survival by a factor of about three, but this procedure requires both medical and swimming skills, and it becomes impractical to send anyone besides the rescuer to execute that task. Chest compressions require a suitable platform, so an in-water assessment of circulation is pointless. If the person does not respond after a few breaths, cardiac arrest may be assumed, and getting them out of the water becomes a priority.

=== First aid ===
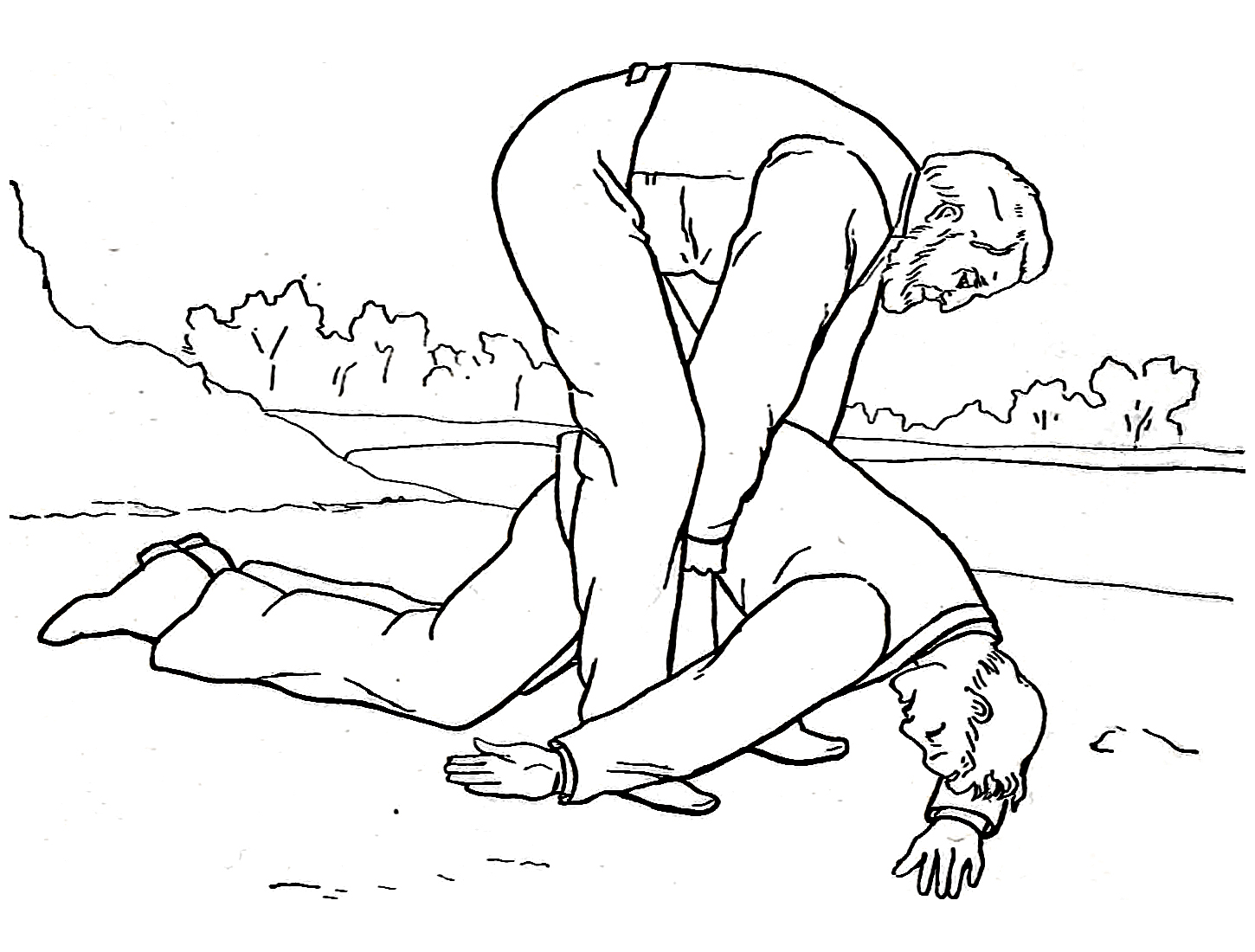
Traditional medical method to expel water from the lungs in victims of drowning, currently inhabitual.

The checks for responsiveness and breathing are carried out with the person lying in a horizontally supine position (face up).

The traditional medical treatment for the drowned started expelling water from their lungs, tilting the victim face down (see drawing at right). However, handling the weight of the body could cost time and efforts in some cases, especially in victims with spinal injury (at the neck or the back) that affected their mobility, which requires special care.

If the victim is unconscious, but breathing, the recovery position is appropriate (laying on a side, usually the right, the left is recommended in women since 7 1/2 months of pregnancy approximately).

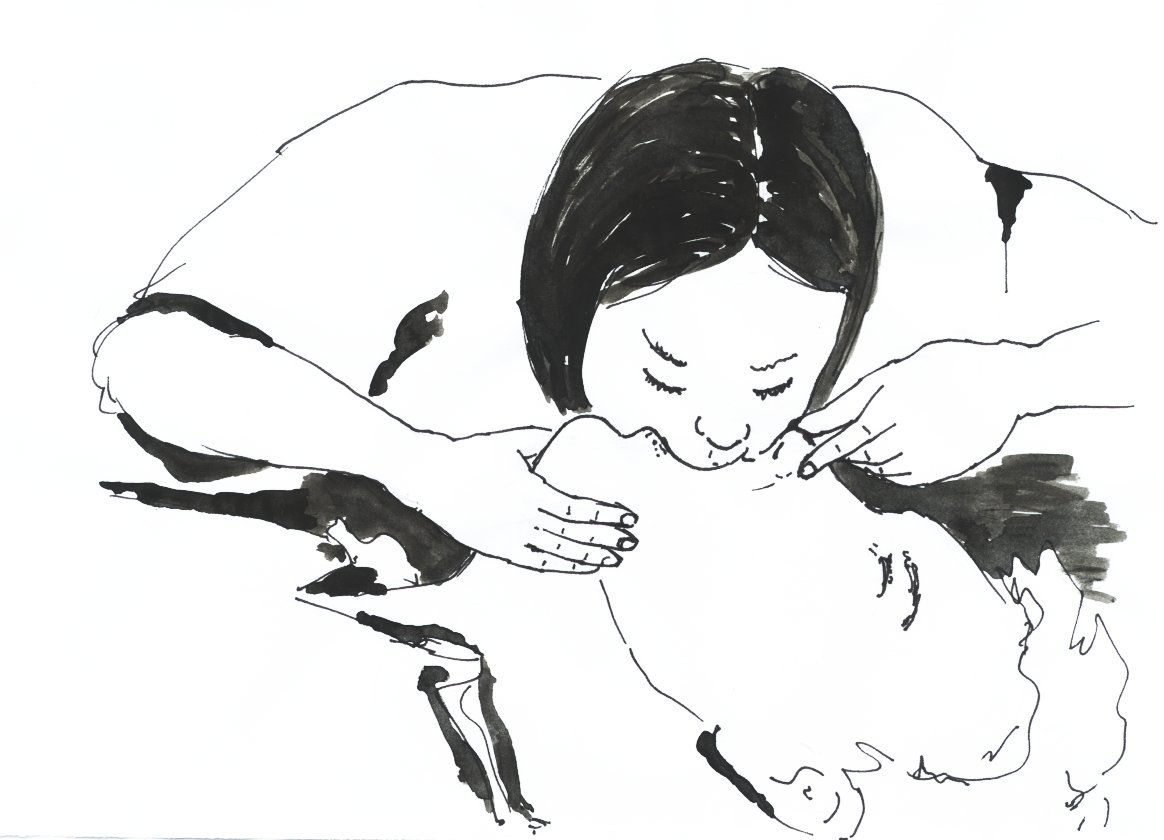
Rescue breaths

If the victim is not breathing, rescue ventilation is necessary. In cases when drowning produces a gasping pattern of apnea while the heart is still beating, ventilation alone could be sufficient. But in the cases when ventilation is not enough, a complete cardiopulmonary resuscitation (CPR) should be used. Guides for victims of drowning indicate calling to an emergency telephone number if not yet done; a rescuer alone with the victim would do it after two minutes of cardiopulmonary resuscitation (CPR).

The cardiopulmonary resuscitation (CPR) would follow an 'airway-breathing-circulation' ('ABC') sequence, starting with rescue breaths rather than with compressions as it is typical in cardiac arrest, because the problem is the lack of oxygen.

For a not-breathing adult or child (someone bigger than a baby), patient's head would be tilted back, to improve the rescue breaths. It is recommended to start the cardiopulmonary resuscitation (CPR) with 2 initial rescue breaths, because of the lack of oxygen and the possibility of water in the airway; the rescue breaths are made by pinching the victim's nose and blowing air mouth-to-mouth, not excessively. Next, it is applied a continual alternation of 30 chest compressions (pressing on the lower half of the sternum, the vertical bone of the middle of the chest) and 2 rescue breaths (in the same manner that the initial ones). This alternation is repeated until vital signs are re-established, the rescuers are unable to continue, or emergency medical services arrive. Additionally, an amount of victims of drowning may have suffered a type of cardiorespiratory arrest that requires a defibrillator (AED) to correct it (read further below).

Chest compressions (proper rhythm)

For not-breathing babies (very small sized infants), the procedure is the same than above but slightly modified: the baby's head is not tilted back, but left straight, looking forward, which is necessary for the rescue breaths, because of the neck's size in babies. In each series of 2 rescue breaths (and the 2 initial breaths), the rescuer's mouth covers the baby's mouth and nose simultaneously (because a baby's face is too small). And, in the intercalated series of 30 chest compressions, they are also applied by pressing on the lower half of the sternum, the vertical bone of the middle of the chest, but with only two fingers (because the body of the baby being more fragile). Additionally, some infants may have suffered a type of cardiorespiratory arrest that requires a defibrillator (AED) to correct it (read below).

Defibrillators (AED) can be found in many public places. They produce a defibrillation (electric shocks) that can restore the pulse of a victim. Anyway, they would only work in some specific cases. Defibrillators are easy to use, as they emit their instructions with voice messages. Before trying a defibrillation, the victim and the rescuer must be out of the water, and the victim's body must be dried. If the body of the victim is extremely cold, it would have to be warmed to improve defibrillation.

Methods to expel water from the airway such as abdominal thrusts (Heimlich maneuver) or positioning the head downwards, should be avoided, due to there being no obstruction by solids, and they delay the start of ventilation, and increase the risk of vomiting. The risk of death is increased, as the aspiration of stomach contents is a common complication of the resuscitation efforts.

Treatment for hypothermia may also be necessary. However, in those who are unconscious, it is recommended their temperature not be increased above 34 degrees C. Because of the diving reflex, people submerged in cold water and apparently drowned may revive after a long period of immersion. Rescuers retrieving a child from water significantly below body temperature should attempt resuscitation even after protracted immersion.

=== Medical care ===
People with a near-drowning experience who have normal oxygen levels and no respiratory symptoms should be observed in a hospital environment for a period of time to ensure there are no delayed complications. The target of ventilation is to achieve 92% to 96% arterial saturation and adequate chest rise. Positive end-expiratory pressure will improve oxygenation. Drug administration via peripheral veins is preferred over endotracheal administration. Hypotension remaining after oxygenation may be treated by rapid crystalloid infusion. Cardiac arrest in drowning usually presents as asystole or pulseless electrical activity. Ventricular fibrillation is more likely to be associated with complications of pre-existing coronary artery disease, severe hypothermia, or the use of epinephrine or norepinephrine.

While surfactant may be used, no high-quality evidence exist that looks at this practice. Extracorporeal membrane oxygenation may be used in those who cannot be oxygenated otherwise. Steroids are not recommended.

== Prognosis ==
Drowning outcomes (after hospital treatment)
| Duration of submersion | Risk of death or poor outcomes |
| 0–5 min | 10% |
| 6–10 min | 56% |
| 11–25 min | 88% |
| >25 min | nearly 100% |
Signs of brain-stem injury predict death or severe neurological consequences

People who have drowned who arrive at a hospital with spontaneous circulation and breathing usually recover with good outcomes. Early provision of basic and advanced life support improve the probability of a positive outcome.

A longer duration of submersion is associated with a lower probability of survival and a higher probability of permanent neurological damage.

Contaminants in the water can cause bronchospasm and impaired gas exchange and can cause secondary infection with delayed severe respiratory compromise.

Low water temperature can cause ventricular fibrillation, but hypothermia during immersion can also slow the metabolism, allowing longer hypoxia before severe damage occurs. Hypothermia that reduces brain temperature significantly can improve the outcome. A reduction of brain temperature by 10 °C decreases ATP consumption by approximately 50%, which can double the time the brain can survive.

The younger the person, the better the chances of survival. In one case, a child submerged in cold (37 °F (3 °C)) water for 66 minutes was resuscitated without apparent neurological damage. However, over the long term significant deficits were noted, including a range of cognitive difficulties, particularly general memory impairment, although recent magnetic resonance imaging (MRI) and magnetoencephalography (MEG) were within normal range.

=== Children ===
Drowning is a major worldwide cause of death and injury in children. An estimate of about 20% of non-fatal drowning victims may result in varying degrees of ischemic and/or hypoxic brain injury. Hypoxic injuries refers to a lack or absence of oxygen in certain organs or tissues. Ischemic injuries on the other hand refers inadequate blood supply to certain organs or part of the body. These injuries can lead to an increased risk of long-term morbidity. Prolonged hypothermia and hypoxemia from nonfatal submersion drowning can result in cardiac dysrhythmias such as ventricular fibrillation, sinus bradycardia, or atrial fibrillation.

Long-term neurological outcomes of drowning cannot be predicted accurately during the early stages of treatment. Although survival after long submersion times, mostly by young children, has been reported, many survivors will remain severely and permanently neurologically compromised after much shorter submersion times. Factors affecting the probability of long-term recovery with mild deficits or full function in young children include the duration of submersion, whether advanced life support was needed at the accident site, the duration of cardiopulmonary resuscitation, and whether spontaneous breathing and circulation are present on arrival at the emergency room. Prolonged submersion in water for more than 5–10 minutes usually leads to poorer prognosis.

Data on the long-term outcome are scarce and unreliable. Neurological examination at the time of discharge from the hospital does not accurately predict long-term outcomes. Some people with severe brain injury who were transferred to other institutions died months or years after the drowning and are recorded as survivors. Nonfatal drownings have been estimated as two-to-four times more frequent than fatal drownings.

==== Long-term effects ====
Long-term effects of nonfatal drowning include damage to major organs such as the brain, lungs, and kidneys. Prolonged submersion time is attributed to hypoxic ischemic brain injury in susceptible areas of the brain such as the hippocampus, insular cortex, and/or basal ganglia. Severity in hypoxic ischemic damage of these brain structures corresponds to the severity in global damage to areas of the cerebral cortex. The cerebral cortex is a brain structure that is responsible for language, memory, learning, emotion, intelligence, and personality. Global damage to the cerebral cortex can affect one or more of its primary function.

Treatment of pulmonary complication from drowning is dependent on the amount of lung injury that occurred during the incident. These lung injuries can be contributed by water aspiration and also irritants present in the water such as microbial pathogens leading to complications such as lung infection that can develop in adult respiratory disease syndrome later on in life.

Some literature suggests that occurrences of drowning can lead to acute kidney injury from lack of blood flow and oxygenation due to shock and global hypoxia. These kidney injury can cause irreversible damage to the kidneys and may require long-term treatment such as renal replacement therapy.

==== Infant risk ====
Children are overrepresented in drowning statistics, with children aged 0–4 years old having the highest number of deaths due to unintentional drowning. In 2019 alone, 32,070 children between the ages of 1 and 4 years died as a result of unintentional drowning, equating to an age-adjusted fatality of 6.04 per 100,000 children. Infants are particularly vulnerable because while their mobility develops quickly, their perception concerning their ability for locomotion between surfaces develops slower. An infant can have full control of their movements, but will not recognize that water does not provide the same support for crawling as hardwood floors would. An infant's capacity for movement needs to be met with an appropriate perception of surfaces of support (and avoidance of surfaces that do not support locomotion) to avoid drowning. By crawling and interacting with their environment, infants learn to distinguish surfaces offering support for locomotion from those that do not, and their perception of surface characteristics will improve, as well as their perception of falls risk, over several weeks.

== Epidemiology ==
The World Health Organization estimates that drowning causes around 300,000 deaths worldwide each year, with 92% of drowning deaths occurring in low- and middle-income countries. It is the fourth leading cause of death among children aged 1-4 years and the third leading cause of death among children aged 5-14 years.

In many countries, drowning is one of the main causes of preventable death for children under 12 years old. In the United States in 2006, 1100 people under 20 years of age died from drowning. The United Kingdom has 450 drownings per year, or 1 per 150,000, whereas in the United States, there are about 6,500 drownings yearly, around 1 per 50,000. In Asia suffocation and drowning were the leading causes of preventable death for children under five years of age; a 2008 report by UNICEF found that in Bangladesh, for instance, 46 children drown each day.

Due to a generally increased likelihood for risk-taking, males are four times more likely to have submersion injuries.

In the fishing industry, the largest group of drownings is associated with vessel disasters in bad weather, followed by man-overboard incidents and boarding accidents at night, either in foreign ports or under the influence of alcohol. Scuba diving deaths are estimated at 700 to 800 per year, associated with inadequate training and experience, exhaustion, panic, carelessness, and barotrauma.

Drowning death rates under 5

Death rate from drowning

Death rate from drowning

=== South Asia ===
Deaths due to drowning is high in the South Asian region with India, China, Pakistan and Bangladesh accounting for up to 52% of the global deaths. Death due to drowning is known to be high in the Sundarbans region in West Bengal and in Bihar.

According to the Daily Times in rural Pakistan, boats are the preferred mode of transport where available. Due to the influence of female modesty culture in Pakistan, women are not encouraged to swim.

In the Iranian Sistan province there have been numerous instances of children dying in hootak water holes.

=== Africa ===
In lower-income countries, cases of drowning and deaths caused by drowning are under reported and data collection is limited. Many low-income countries in Africa have the highest rates of drowning, with incidence rates calculated from population-based studies across 15 different countries (Burkina Faso, Côte d'Ivoire, Egypt, Ethiopia, the Gambia, Ghana, Guinea, Kenya, Malawi, Nigeria, Seychelles, South Africa, Uganda, Tanzania, and Zimbabwe) ranging from 0.33 per 100,000 population to 502 per 100,000 population. Potential risk factors include young age, being male, having to commute across or work on the water (e.g. fishermen), quality and carrying capacity of the boat, and poor weather.

=== United States ===
In the United States, drowning is the second leading cause of death (after motor vehicle accidents) in children aged 12 and younger.

People who drown are more likely to be male, young, or adolescent. There is a racial disparity found in drowning incidents. According to CDC data collected from 1999 to 2019, drowning rates among Native Americans was 2 times higher than among non-Hispanic whites while the rate among African-Americans was 1.5 times higher. Surveys indicate that 10% of children under 5 have experienced a situation with a high risk of drowning. Worldwide, about 175,000 children die through drowning every year. The causes of drowning cases in the US from 1999 to 2006 were as follows:

| 31.0% | Drowning and submersion while in natural water |
| 27.9% | Unspecified drowning and submersion |
| 14.5% | Drowning and submersion while in swimming pool |
| 9.4% | Drowning and submersion while in bathtub |
| 7.2% | Drowning and submersion following fall into natural water |
| 6.3% | Other specified drowning and submersion |
| 2.9% | Drowning and submersion following fall into swimming pool |
| 0.9% | Drowning and submersion following fall into bathtub |

According to the US National Safety Council, 353 people ages 5 to 24 drowned in 2017.

== Society and culture ==
=== Old terminology ===
The word "drowning"—like "electrocution"—was previously used to describe fatal events only. Occasionally, that usage is still insisted upon, though the medical community's consensus supports the definition used in this article. Several terms related to drowning which have been used in the past are also no longer recommended. These include:

- Active drowning: people, such as non-swimmers and the exhausted or hypothermic at the surface, who are unable to hold their mouth above water and are suffocating due to lack of air. Instinctively, people in such cases perform well-known behaviors in the last 20–60 seconds before being submerged, representing the body's last efforts to obtain air. Notably, such people are unable to call for help, talk, reach for rescue equipment, or alert swimmers even feet away, and they may drown quickly and silently close to other swimmers or safety.
- Dry drowning: drowning in which no water enters the lungs.
- Near drowning: drowning which is not fatal.
- Wet drowning: drowning in which water enters the lungs.
- Passive drowning: people who suddenly sink or have sunk due to a change in their circumstances. Examples include people who drown in an accident due to sudden loss of consciousness or sudden medical condition.
- Secondary drowning: physiological response to foreign matter in the lungs due to drowning causing extrusion of liquid into the lungs (pulmonary edema) which adversely affects breathing.
- Silent drowning: drowning without a noticeable external display of distress.

=== Dry drowning ===
"Dry drowning" is an urban legend according to which some people, notably children, die of drowning hours or days after swimming or ingesting water. Misinformation about this supposed phenomenon is spread cyclically, mostly at the beginning of summer, over social media.

As a medical condition, "dry drowning" has never had an accepted definition, and the term is discredited. Following the 2002 World Congress on Drowning in Amsterdam, a consensus definition of drowning was established: it is the "process of experiencing respiratory impairment from submersion/immersion in liquid." This definition resulted in only three legitimate drowning subsets: fatal drowning, non-fatal drowning with illness/injury, and non-fatal drowning without illness/injury. In response, major medical consensus organizations have adopted this definition worldwide and have discouraged any medical or publication use of the term "dry drowning". Such organizations include the International Liaison Committee on Resuscitation, the Wilderness Medical Society, the American Heart Association, the Utstein Style system, the International Lifesaving Federation, the International Conference on Drowning, Starfish Aquatics Institute, the American Red Cross, the Centers for Disease Control and Prevention (CDC), the World Health Organization and the American College of Emergency Physicians.

Drowning experts have recognized that the resulting pathophysiology of hypoxemia, acidemia, and eventual death is the same whether water entered the lung or not. As this distinction does not change management or prognosis but causes significant confusion due to alternate definitions and misunderstandings, it is established that pathophysiological discussions of "dry" versus "wet" drowning are not relevant to drowning care.

"Dry drowning" is cited in the news with a wide variety of definitions. and is often confused with "secondary drowning" or "delayed drowning". Various conditions including spontaneous pneumothorax, chemical pneumonitis, bacterial or viral pneumonia, head injury, asthma, heart attack, and chest trauma have been misattributed to the erroneous terms "delayed drowning", "secondary drowning", and "dry drowning". Currently, there has never been a case identified in the medical literature where a person was observed to be without symptoms and who died hours or days later as a direct result of drowning alone. However, forensic pathologist Dr. Cyril H. Wecht has published at least one opinion asserting that the cause of death of a 16-year-old student was due to "delayed drowning".

=== Capital punishment ===
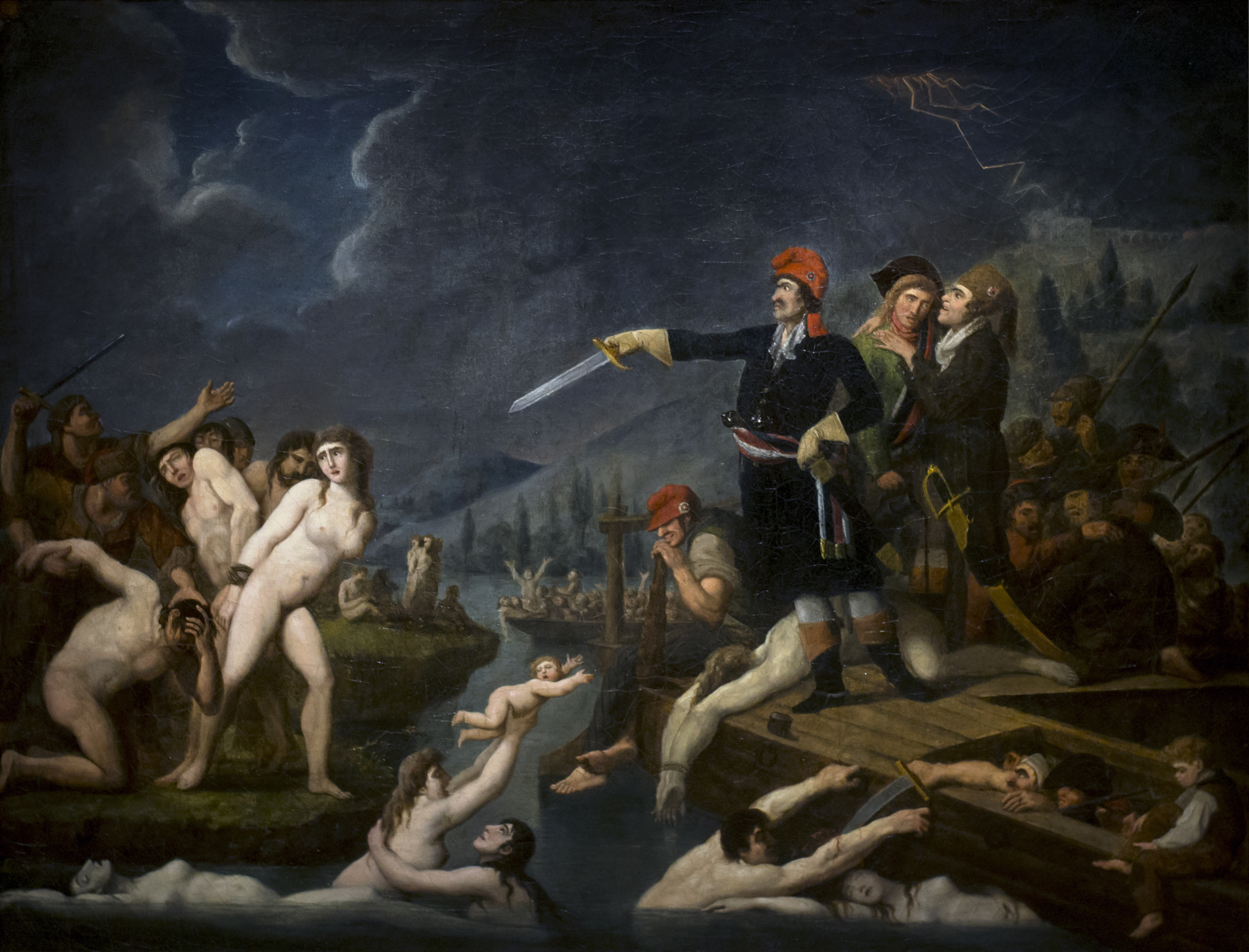
The Drownings at Nantes, anonymous period painting, Musée d'histoire de Nantes

In Europe, drowning was used as capital punishment. During the Middle Ages, a sentence of death was read using the words cum fossa et furca, or "with pit and gallows".

Drowning survived as a method of execution in Europe until the 17th and 18th centuries. England had abolished the practice by 1623, Scotland by 1685, Switzerland in 1652, Austria in 1776, Iceland in 1777, and Russia by the beginning of the 1800s. France revived the practice during the French Revolution (1789–1799) and it was carried out by Jean-Baptiste Carrier at Nantes.

== Experience ==
People who have experienced drowning have reported slowing of time, but this is suggested to be a function of recollection, not perception. If the person is conscious after the initial struggle and breath-holding, they may feel a burning or tearing sensation on aspirating water. This burning sensation does not depend on the type of water. Following this painful feeling, many report peaceful perceptions, hallucinations, diminished pain and even euphoria. Sensations of tranquility are not limited to drowning, and similar perceptions have also been reported in near-death experiences from other causes. The euphoria and calmness can be attributed to cerebral hypoxia and consequent changes in neurotransmitters. These experiences vary by person, because the rate of oxygen loss in the blood (and resulting hypoxia) depends on the circumstances.

== See also ==
- Instinctive drowning response
