= PIA Planetarium, Lahore =

Planetarium in Lahore, Pakistan

Coordinates: 31°33′28″N 74°18′20″E

- Interactive map of the PIA Planetarium, Lahore area

General information
- Type: Planetarium
- Location: Near Chauburji, Lahore, Punjab, Pakistan
- Completed: 1987
- Owner: Pakistan International Airlines
- Operator: Pakistan International Airlines

The PIA Planetarium, Lahore is a planetarium near Chauburji in Lahore, Punjab, Pakistan. It is operated by Pakistan International Airlines (PIA) and was inaugurated in 1987 as the airline's second planetarium in Pakistan, after the Karachi planetarium. The complex includes a domed projection hall and a static aircraft display.

== Site and facilities ==
The planetarium is near Chauburji in central Lahore. The complex occupied 24 kanals of land held by the University of the Punjab. It has a combination of 220 projectors rather than a conventional film screening. In addition to the dome building, the complex has included a static aircraft and an observatory for visitors.

== History ==
PIA opened the Lahore planetarium in 1987, three years after the establishment of the Karachi planetarium in 1984. By 2004, one of four German-imported planetarium units procured by PIA had been installed at Lahore.

By the late 2000s, the planetarium was facing financial and maintenance problems buy still served school and college students. In 2012, an educational show at the planetarium was included in a PIA-arranged visit for critically ill children associated with the Make-A-Wish Foundation.

By the late 2010s and 2020s, it was increasingly being used for cultural events beyond its original educational role. It was also used by the Lahore Biennale Foundation as a venue for the Lahore Biennale. In 2025, a music event titled Mission CTRL was held at the PIA Planetarium.

== See also ==
- PIA Planetarium, Karachi
- PIA Planetarium, Peshawar
- Pakistan International Airlines
