= Peruvian International Airways =

Peruvian airline

IATA	ICAO	Call sign
-	-	-
- Founded: January 14, 1946
- Commenced operations: 1947
- Ceased operations: 1949
- Fleet size: See Fleet details below
- Destinations: Havana, Cuba; Santiago, Chile
- Headquarters: Lima, Peru
- Key people: C.M Keys, Clarence W. Webster, William O. Webster

Peruvian International Airways (PIA) was the first international airline from Peru and operated from 1947 to 1949.

== Company history ==
The international air services provided to and from Peru from the mid-forties until the beginning of the decade of the sixties were under dominance of the Panagra (the joint of the Pan American airways and the W.R Grace Corporation). With almost no competition in the very low fare market of the South-American west coast, Panagra could develop an effective monopoly during this period of time.

The only other serious presence in the first years after the second world war trying to achieve a native international air transportation service out of Lima, center of the Peruvian commercial world, was the PIA - Peruvian International Airways. The airline was founded on January 14, 1946, with a capital of four million dollars (or $47.7 million in 2023) by a group of investors of three different countries, Peru, Canada and the United States of America headed by C.M Keys, also initial promoter of Faucett Airlines.

The airline started operations a little more than a year later on May 14, 1947, using the Douglas DC-4 with flight to Havana via Panama to the north. The network was promptly extended to the south to Santiago via Antofagasta a few months later and half a year after initiating operations. In September, the northern routes were extended to Washington and New York.

The slogan used for the straight in route from Santiago to New York was the “Aerial Avenue of the Americas” (la avenida de las Americas). As business seemed to go fine, the airline enthusiastically approved to double the capital in October that year. Unfortunately, the airline failed in its attempt to be competition for Panagra when Panagra new introduced pressurized DC-6 on almost the same route from New York to Buenos Aires via Panama, Lima and Santiago. Besides that, a new entry in the Latin American market in June 1948, Braniff Airlines, finally pushed PIA into its final approach. Peruvian International Airways began flying to New York's new International Airport (then IDL, now JFK) on Friday, July 9, 1948, when DC-4 OB-SAF arrived from Santiago de Chile, via Lima, Panama City, Havana and Washington DC. The Peruvian aircraft started a dubious tradition the following day when it departed half an hour late due to the delayed arrival of a bus carrying passengers from the city.

On February 9, 1949, less than two years after its foundation, PIA ceased operations.

== Fleet details ==
- 1 Douglas DC-4
