= PIA Planetarium, Peshawar =

Planetarium in Peshawar, Pakistan

Coordinates: 34°00′52″N 71°34′03″E

- Interactive map of the PIA Planetarium, Peshawar area

General information
- Type: Planetarium
- Location: Hayatabad Phase II; Peshawar, Khyber Pakhtunkhwa, Pakistan
- Completed: 2 April 2011
- Owner: Pakistan International Airlines
- Operator: Pakistan International Airlines

The PIA Planetarium, Peshawar is a planetarium in Hayatabad, Peshawar, Khyber Pakhtunkhwa, Pakistan. It is operated by Pakistan International Airlines (PIA) and was inaugurated on 2 April 2011, becoming the third PIA-operated planetarium in Pakistan after those in Karachi and Lahore. The facility was designed to accommodate about 250 viewers in a single session.

== Site and facilities ==
The planetarium is located in Hayatabad Phase II, near Ghani Bagh and Zarghuni Mosque. Its main hall uses a dome-shaped screen for astronomy shows. Its projection technology was imported from Germany at a cost of US$600,000, while another Rs 30 million were spent on the rest of the infrastructure.

== History ==
In August 1984, the president of Pakistan allotted a 30-kanal plot in G-2, Hayatabad, for a PIA planetarium, and PIA received physical possession of the land through an allotment letter dated 27 March 1995. In the 1980s, electronic machinery was imported from Germany for the Peshawar and Quetta planetariums.

In 2008, German engineers installed the machinery, but the project was delayed for years amid administrative problems and the deteriorating law-and-order situation in Khyber Pakhtunkhwa. The planetarium was formally inaugurated on 2 April 2011 by Khyber Pakhtunkhwa information minister Mian Iftikhar Hussain. PIA said the facility would operate on a no-profit, no-loss basis.

Soon after opening, the planetarium drew criticism for neglect. In 2012, it was reported that many rooms were empty, the audio-visual material used in the shows was outdated, and the facility remained obscure even to many residents of Hayatabad.

Despite these problems, the site was also used as a venue for public cultural events in the mid-2010s. The Tourism Corporation Khyber Pakhtunkhwa held Hunar Mela at the planetarium in January 2016, and the provincial sports and youth affairs department organized the Hum Jawan youth cultural festival there in April 2016. Another Hunar Mela was held at the planetarium in 2017.

A later dispute arose between PIA and the Peshawar Development Authority (PDA) over the land allotment. In 2009, the PDA cancelled the allotment, restored it in 2015 subject to a Rs 60 million payment, withdrew that restoration in 2017 when PIA did not pay, and sealed the premises later that year. In February 2025, an additional district judge ordered that possession of the site be granted to PIA on the condition that the planetarium be made fully functional within three years; otherwise, the plot would revert to the PDA.

== See also ==
- PIA Planetarium, Karachi
- PIA Planetarium, Lahore
- Pakistan International Airlines
