= Pius Vilakati =

Swazi democracy activist

Pius Vilakati is a Swazi democracy activist, as well as the former President of the University of Swaziland Student Representative Council (SRC) and a former prominent member of the Swaziland National Union of Students (SNUS).

Pius Vilakati is a member of the Central Committee of the Communist Party of Swaziland.

Vilakati was a key figure in the SNUS campaign to improve the level of education in Swaziland in early 2010. The campaign sought registration of SNUS as a true representative of the students, free primary education, draft scholarship policy and increased personal allowances for students. Having instigated several marches and class boycotts to protest against educational standards in relation to the campaign, as well as against the political climate in Swaziland in general, Vilakati and several other members of SNUS were abducted, tortured and held incommunicado by police. Vilakati was suspended from his studies at university on several occasions, once for having allegedly “vandalised” property during demonstrations against the celebrations to mark King Mswati’s 40th birthday in 2008.

Pius Vilakati is believed to have been abducted by police following a police crack down on the funeral of Pudemo member Sipho Jele, after having held a speech criticising the Swazi regime. Vilakati initially escaped arrest by being smuggled out from the funeral in the hearse. His disappearance was first noticed when didn’t turn up for a written exam on May 17 at the University of Swaziland where he is a student. Furthermore, Vilakati was absent when his fellow students collected their examination results on June 30, 2010 at the University of Swaziland.

According to a statement by Swaziland National Union of Students, Pius Vilakati managed to escape to South Africa where he is currently hiding. “We, the Swaziland National Union of Students humbly appeal for scholarship assistant for one of our members, democracy and human rights activists Phiwayinkhosi Pius Vilakati who was forced to abandon his studies at the University of Swaziland where he was doing bachelors degree in law. He was forced to abandon his studies after being sought for statement he made during the memorial service of the late PUDEMO member and unionist Sipho hereafter having held a speech criticizing the Swazi regime. He escaped to South Africa where he is currently hiding."
