= Treading water =

Swimming style

A boy treading water in a pool

Treading water or water treading is what a swimmer can do while in a vertical position to keep their head above the surface of the water, while not providing sufficient directional thrust to overcome inertia and propel the swimmer in any specific direction. As it expends less energy than traditional strokes, it is often used by swimmers to rest in between periods of exertion without having to leave the water.

In figurative language, the expression "treading water" has become a metaphor for an effort expected to create motion, but which actually results in merely staying in one, possibly barely sustainable, place.

== Methods ==
Any sort of movement that allows the swimmer to do this can be classified as treading water, but it is more efficient to move the arms and legs in a specific fashion.

Non-swimmers often splash and kick in an effort to stay above the surface, but their lack of technique - along with shortness of breath and the panic factor - make for a very ineffective method of treading water. They will usually tire quickly and not be able to stay above the surface very long.

Experienced swimmers use a variety of techniques to stay above the surface. These techniques often involve sculling, the eggbeater kick, flutter kick, and other unofficial techniques of staying above the surface.

=== Eggbeater kick ===
The eggbeater kick is an efficient method of treading water. It involves the swimmer in a "sitting position" in the water. The swimmer's back must be straight, knees bent so that the thighs are parallel to the surface of the water, and lower legs perpendicular to the surface.

The left foot makes a clockwise motion while the right leg makes a counterclockwise motion towards the axis of the body, in a similar manner to operating the pedals on a bicycle. The legs should never meet as when one foot is on the inside of the motion, the other should be on the outside. The arms are not involved directly in this kick.

The most critical aspect to having an effective eggbeater kick is flexibility. A good hip motion range is needed to achieve a good eggbeater kick.

The eggbeater kick can be used to move through the water if the body is angled. Because of the opposite motion of the legs, the eggbeater is a very smooth and steady way of treading water. Another thing worth mentioning is that it does not usually involve the use of the hands, leaving them to be used for other matters.

Because of its efficiency and simplicity, this method of treading water is one of the most commonly used methods by lifeguards and other aquatic rescue professionals. Since this method does not occupy the hands it is often used by these kinds of professionals as they sometimes have to perform first aid while swimming back to safety.

The eggbeater kick is also used in water polo because it lets the athletes use their arms to throw the ball. The eggbeater kick is the primary kick that enables the player to support themselves in the water while passing, shooting, defending, and resting – horizontally and vertically. It is also used for getting a quick, explosive start, when the player is beginning to swim. Greater elevation of the Polo player is created by a stronger eggbeater kick which results in a better rotation and stronger pass or shot. Overuse of the eggbeater kick has been a cause of knee injuries in water polo players.

Furthermore, the eggbeater kick is also used in synchronized swimming since it grants stability and height above the water while leaving the hands free to perform strokes. Using the eggbeater, swimmers can also perform "boosts", where they use their legs to momentarily propel themselves out of the water to their hips or higher.

=== Dog paddle and others ===
The dog paddle is a simple style often used instinctively by children. It involves waving both hands & legs randomly while "on all fours".

Another popular style involves sculling water horizontally while using flutter kicks vertically.

== See also ==
- List of swimming styles
- Spyhopping, vertically and momentarily staying out of the water by whales
