= Piia =

Female given name

Piia is a Finnish and Estonian feminine given name. Bearers include:

- Piia Pantsu (born 1971), Finnish equestrian rider
- Piia-Noora Kauppi (born 1975), Finnish politician
- Piia Suomalainen, (born 1984), Finnish tennis player

== See also ==
- Namahana Piia (1787–1829), wife of King Kamehameha I of Hawaii
- PIIA or Pakistan Institute of International Affairs
