= Pia (given name) =

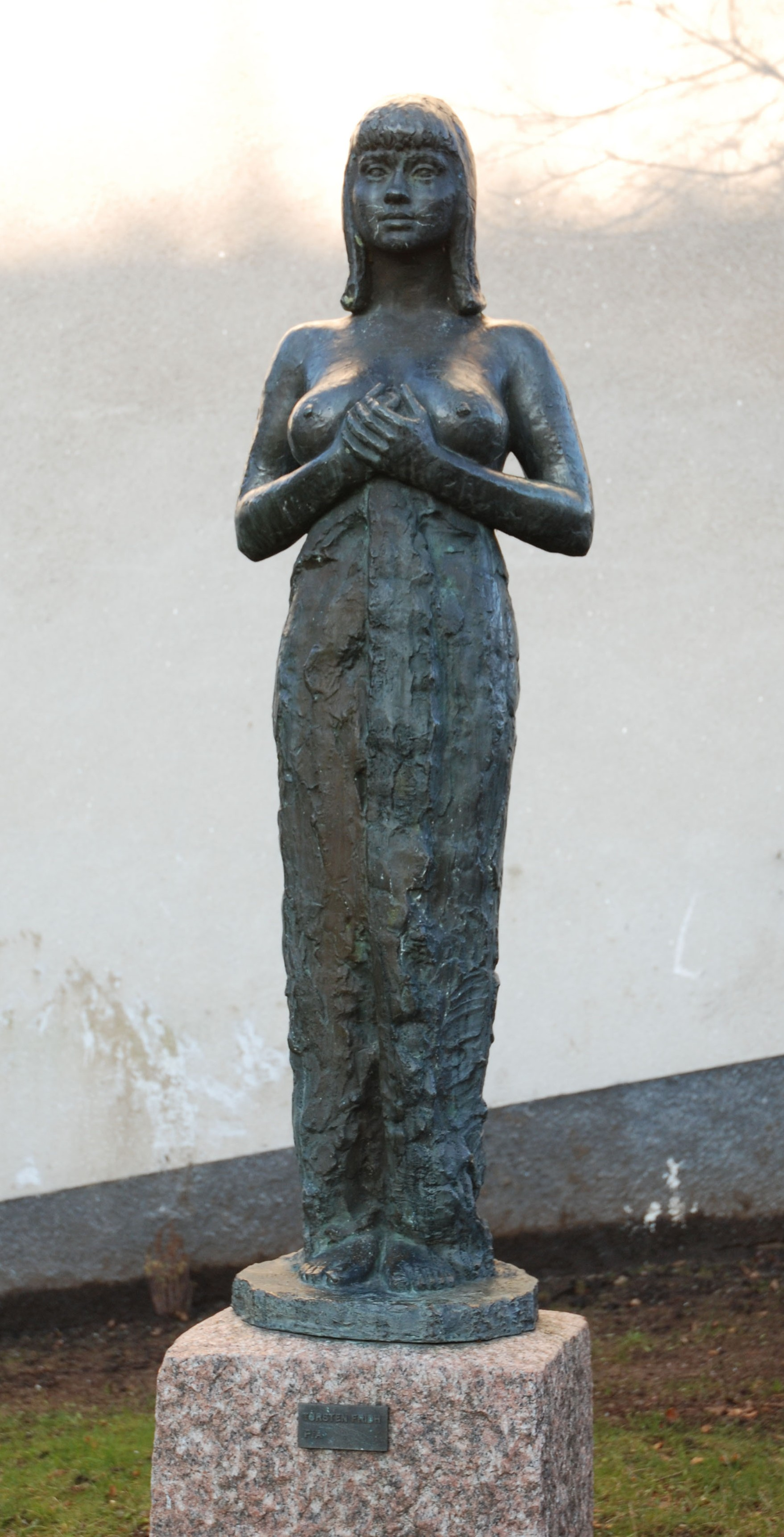
- Torsten Fridh's Pia, bronze, around 1965, Bredäng, Stockholm, Sweden
- Gender: female
- Language: Latin

Origin
- Meaning: pious, devout

Other names
- Related names: Piedad, Piia

Pia is a feminine given name. In Spanish, it is spelled Pía.

== In politics ==
- Pia Adelsteen (born 1963), Danish politician
- Pia Beckmann (born 1963), German politician and entrepreneur
- Pia Cayetano (born 1966), Filipina lawyer and politician
- Pia Christmas-Møller (born 1961), Danish politician
- Pia Olsen Dyhr (born 1971), Danish politician, former Minister for Trade and Investment and Minister for Transport
- Pia Gjellerup (born 1959), Danish politician
- Pia Hallström (1961–2016), Swedish politician
- Pia Hiltunen (born 1991), Finnish politician
- Pia Kauma (born 1966), Finnish politician
- Pia Kjærsgaard (born 1947), Danish politician
- Pia Locatelli (born 1949), Italian politician
- Pia Nilsson (politician) (born 1962), Swedish politician
- Pia Viitanen (born 1967), Finnish politician and former Minister of Culture and Housing
- Pia Maria Wieninger (born 1982), Austrian politician

== In arts and entertainment ==
- Pia Arke (1958–2007), Danish Greenlandic painter, photographer and writer
- Pia Bajpai (born 1991), Indian film actress
- Pia Clemente, American film producer, first Filipino-American nominated for an Academy Award
- Pia Degermark (born 1949), Swedish retired actress
- Pia Di Ciaula, Canadian film editor
- Pia Douwes (born 1964), Dutch musical theater actress
- Pia Fries (born 1955), Swiss painter
- Pia Getty (born 1966), American independent filmmaker
- Pia Giancaro (born 1950), Italian retired actress
- Pia Guanio (born 1974), Filipina actress and television presenter
- Pia Guerra (fl. 1990s–present), Canadian comic book artist
- Pia Johansson (born 1960), Swedish actress
- Pia Juul (1962–2020), Danish poet and writer
- Pia Maiocco (born 1962), American former bass guitarist and backing vocalist for the all-female hard rock band Vixen
- Pia Mia (born 1996), American singer, songwriter and model
- Pia Miller (born 1983), Chilean-born Australian fashion model, actress and television presenter
- Pia Miranda (born 1973), Australian actress
- Pia Pera (1956–2016), Italian novelist, essayist and translator
- Pia Reyes (born 1964), Filipina-American Playboy Playmate of the Month, model and actress
- Pía Sebastiani (1925–2015), Argentine pianist and composer
- Pia Tafdrup (born 1952), Danish poet and author
- Pia Tassinari (1903–1995), Italian opera singer
- Pia Tikka (born 1961), Finnish film director and screenwriter
- Pia Tjelta (born 1977), Norwegian actress
- Pia Toscano (born 1988), American singer and American Idol contestant
- Pia Wurtzbach (born 1989), German-Filipina actress, TV host and model, Miss Universe 2015
- Pia Zadora (born 1953), American actress and singer

== In sports ==
- Pia Fink (born 1995), German cross-country skier
- Pia Hansen (born 1965), Swedish sport shooter, 2000 Olympic champion
- Pia Lionetti (born 1987), Italian archer
- Pia Nielsen (fl. 1970s–1980s), Danish retired badminton player
- Pia Nilsson (golfer) (born 1954), Swedish golfer
- Pia Schmid (fl. 1996–?), Swiss Paralympic sprinter
- Pia Skrzyszowska, Polish 100 m hurdler and relay runner
- Pia Sundhage (born 1960), Swedish retired footballer
- Pia Sundstedt (born 1975), Finnish road and mountain cyclist
- Pia Tajnikar (born 1985), Slovenian sprinter
- Pia Thomsen, Danish cricketer who was on the 1993 national team
- Pia Trulsen (born 1991), Norwegian curler
- Pia Vogel (born 1969), Swiss rower
- Pia Wunderlich (born 1975), German footballer
- Pia Zebadiah Bernadet (born 1989), Indonesian badminton player
- Pia Zinck (born 1971), Danish retired high jumper

== In journalism ==
- Pia Arcangel (born 1978), Filipina newscaster and journalist
- Pia Conde (born 1970), Swedish journalist and television presenter
- Pia Dijkstra (born 1954) Dutch former television newscaster who later became an elected politician
- Pia Hontiveros (born 1967), Filipina broadcast journalist
- Pia Lindström (born 1938), Swedish television anchor, daughter of Ingrid Bergman
- Pia Ranada, Filipino journalist

== Other ==
- Pia Andrews (born 1979), Australian free software advocate
- Pia Cramling (born 1963), Swedish chess Grandmaster
- Pia Haraldsen (born 1981), Norwegian television personality
- Pia Klemp (born 1983), German biologist and human rights activist
- Pia Nalli (1886–1964), Italian mathematician
- Pia de Solenni, 20th–21st century Catholic theologian
