= Paris de Grassis =

Italian theologian (c.1470–1528)

The Most Reverend Paris de Grassis
- Bishop of Pesaro
- Church: Roman Catholic
- Diocese: Pesaro
- Appointed: 4 April 1513
- In office: 1513-1528
- Successor: Giacomo Simoneta

Orders
- Consecration: 16 May 1513 by Achille Grassi

Personal details
- Died: 10 June 1528 Rome

Paris de Grassis (also Paride de' Grassi, c. 1470 – 10 June 1528) was the master of ceremonies to Pope Julius II and Pope Leo X. He joined the Office of Ceremonies in May 1504 as a participating ceremonialist, progressed to role of president of the Office when he became bishop of Pesaro in 1513, and continued as president until he died in 1528. De Grassis' diary covers his work at the papal court from 1504 to 1521.

== Biography ==
He was born at Bologna into a lesser patrician family. During his lifetime the family would rise in status from its professional roots in the law faculty at the University and in the College of Notaries to fill important offices in the Bolognese senate, as well as in the Bolognese church and at the papal court. His father, Baldassare, had been a member of College of Notaries since 1464, while other uncles graduated from the University of Bologna with doctorates in canon and civil law, taught at the same university, and sometimes served as canons in the Bolognese cathedral chapter or as elected members of the Anziani Consoli. The de Grassis men of Baldassare's generation married women from similar Bolognese patrician families including the Zambeccari, the Paleotti, the Bucchi, the Aldrovandi, and the Gozzadini. This created a network of families whose social status and employment derived from a select group of institutions, and which experienced diverse fortunes through the political disruptions caused by the fall of the Bentivoglio family and the creation of the new senate by Pope Julius II.

His most successful uncle was Antonio de Grassis, nuncio to Frederick III and Bishop of Tivoli. Antonio's success established a clear path for his nephews to follow up the clerical hierarchy, leaving Bologna for the papal court in Rome. Paris' older brother Achille de Grassis, followed his uncle as an Auditor of the Rota, served as a papal diplomat under Julius II, was appointed Bishop of Città di Castello in 1506 and Archbishop of Bologna in 1511 and died in November 1523. Paris' eldest brother, Agamenone de Grassis, was the family's anchor in Bologna, where he worked as a notary, and held several governmental offices including a senator's seat in the Quaranta Consiglieri from 1511. In addition Paris had two sisters (Ludovica and Margherita) who married into the Morbioli and Gozzadini families respectively. The family Grassi Palace at Via Marsala 12 in Bologna now belongs to the municipal government. The family archive is housed in the Archivio di Stato di Bologna.

In 1506 Paris de Grassis succeeded the famous Johann Burchard, as the senior Master of Ceremonies. Burchard had served as a ceremonialist to popes Sixtus IV, Innocent VIII and Alexander VI, the events of which he recorded in his Diarium. In this period the ceremonialists maintained a diary as a matter of course, recording the daily liturgy, visitors, and events of the papal court. De Grassis' diary covers the closing years of the pontificates of Julius II and Leo X (1504–21). De Grassi was in charge of the preparations and facilities constructions of the Fifth Lateran Council, which he recounts in his diaries.

The period following the end of de Grassis' diary, which closes with the burial of Leo X (17 December 1521), is unclear. There are few extant sources that can pinpoint reliably de Grassis' location or his day-to-day activities. The diary of his colleague, and successor as senior Master of Ceremonies, Biagio Martinelli notes de Grassis' periodic activities at the papal court, but it does not indicate that he was a constant presence there. Nevertheless, Martinelli did record de Grassis' death in Rome in 1528.

== Works ==
De Grassis was not a historian, merely a chronicler; with professional care he jotted down the minutiae of all pontifical ceremonies, trivial occurrences at the Roman Curia, the consistories and processions, the coming and going of ambassadors, journeys, etc. His writings are generally unsympathetic towards the French and towards various curial dignitaries. His sole interest was ceremonial and court etiquette and the meticulous recording of all details relating to such. Nevertheless, his eye was alert to catch all that went on around him; in consequence his writings include quite a number of anecdotes that throw much light on the characters of the two popes. Moreover, being the almost inseparable companion of both popes on their journeys, e.g. of Julius II during his campaign against the Romagna, he supplies many details that fill in or set off the narrative of the historian, down to such minute details such as the popes' food preferences and daily attire. Ordinarily his work offers more to the historian of Renaissance culture than to the student of ecclesiastico-political conditions.

The sixteen manuscript copies of the Diarium are not all complete, the more important codices being those of the Vatican Library and of the Rossiana Library at Vienna. British scholars have also made substantial use of a seventeenth-century copy of the diary housed in the British Library. The definitive discussion of de Grassis' diary, the manuscripts, and his other compositions can be found in Marc Dykmans' collection of essays in the journal Ephemerides liturgicae (1982, 1985, 1986).

De Grassis wrote treatises on a variety of topics pertaining to Roman Catholic liturgy and the liturgical ceremonies and diplomatic practices of the papal court in the early sixteenth century.

- Caeremonialium regularum supplementum et additiones ad secundum illarum volumen
- De ceremoniis ad cardinales episcopos spectantibus
- Brevis ordo Romanus
- Caeremoniarum opusculum
- De caeremoniis capellae papalis
- Ordo dandi pacem in capella papae
- Ordo incensandi in capella papae
- Preparanda pro missa episcopali solemni in die alicuius festi presentibus cardinalibus
- Tractatus de equitatione papae per Vrbem in solemnitate non pontificali
- Tractatus de funeribus et exequiis in Romana Curia peragendis
- Infrascriptus modus servator in infirmitate papae et eius morte
- Tractatus de oratoribus Romanae curiae
- De oratorum praecendentia
- De consecratione episcoporum

Of this list the only composition to be published was De ceremoniis ad cardinales episcopos spectantibus as De Cerimoniis Cardinalivm, et Episcoporum in eorum dioecesibus. Libri dvo., posthumously in Rome in 1564 and 1580, and then reprinted in Venice in 1582. These volumes are widely available both in European and North American libraries.

Although there is no complete version of de Grassis' diary available in publication, there are several excerpts available:

- Marc Dykmans, "Le cinquième concile du Latran d'après le diaire de Paris de Grassi", Annuarium Historiae Conciliorum, 14 (1982): 271–369.
- Edmund, Bishop, "Leaves from the diary of a papal Master of ceremonies", Liturgica Historica: Papers on the Liturgy and Religious Life of the Western Church. Oxford: Clarendon Press, 1918.
- Paride Grassi. Le Due Spedizioni Militari di Giulio II. ed. Luigi Frati. Bologna: 1886.
- Il Diario di Leone X di Paride de Grassi Maestro delle Cerimonie Pontificie. ed. Pio Delicati & Mariano Armellini. Rome: 1884.
- Paride de' Grassi. De ingressu Summi Pont. Leonis X. Florentiam Descriptio Paridis De Grassis civis Bononiensis Pisauriensis Episcopi. ed. Domenico Moreni. Florence: Caietanum Cambiagi, 1793.
