= Arco del Meloncello, Bologna =

Coordinates: 44.4901°N 11.311°E

Arco del Meloncello
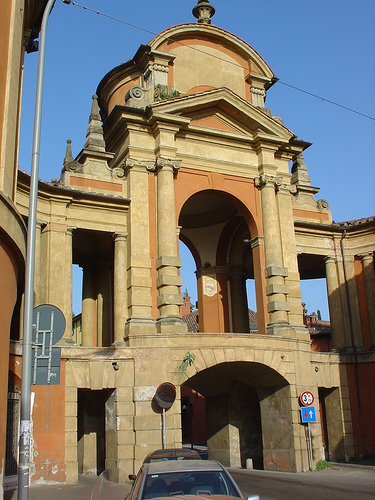
- Picture of Arco del Melocello
- Interactive map of Arco del Meloncello
- Periods: 18th-Century
- Location: Bologna, Italy

History
- Built: 18th Century
- Condition: Restored

Site notes
- Public access: Open

The Arco del Meloncello is an 18th-century Rococo structure in Bologna, that forms a pedestrian portico over the road (hence an arch); it is part of the Portico di San Luca, a long arcade that sheltered the walk from the Cathedral of Bologna to the hillside Sanctuary of San Luca, Bologna. It lies beyond the gates of the Porta Saragozza, outside the former city walls of Bologna.

The arch solved the problem of a site where two roads intersected at right angles, and allowed the foot traffic of the pilgrims to proceed above the road, Via Saragozza, uninterrupted. The architect was Carlo Francesco Dotti won the commission during a competition in 1714, and created the scenographic arrangement with the help of Francesco Galli Bibiena during 1721 to 1732. In the early twentieth century, in a project supervised by Tito Azzolino, the arch was raised a few meters to allow passage of a train underneath.
