= Maggiore =

Maggiore means "major" or "large" in Italian. It can refer to:

== Locations and places ==
- Lake Maggiore, located in northwestern Italy and southern Switzerland
- Isola Maggiore, the second largest island on Lake Trasimeno, Umbria, Italy
- Fontana Maggiore, a fountain in Perugia, Italy
- Porta Maggiore Basilica, an underground basilica discovered in 1917 near Porta Maggiore in Rome, Italy
- Porta Maggiore, Bologna (now Porta Mazzini), the main eastern portal of the former medieval walls of the city of Bologna, Italy
- Portomaggiore, a town in Ferrara, Italy
- Monte Maggiori or Učka, a mountain range in Croatia

== People ==
- Christine Maggiore (1956—2008), HIV-positive activist who promoted the view that HIV is not the cause of AIDS
- Gianluca Maggiore (born 1985), Italian former racing cyclist
- Giulio Maggiore (born 1998), Italian football player
- Hervé Della Maggiore (born 1972), French former football midfielder

== Other uses ==
- Maggiore (grape), an Italian wine grape also known as Verdicchio
- Major and minor
- Major (rank)
