= Carlo Francesco Dotti =

Italian architect

- Wax bust of Carlo Francesco Dotti by Angelo Piò
- Born: 31 December 1669; Bologna, Papal States
- Died: 3 June 1759 (aged 89); Bologna, Papal States
- Occupation: Architect
- Known for: Madonna di San Luca, Bologna; Arco del Meloncello, Bologna
- Movement: Baroque

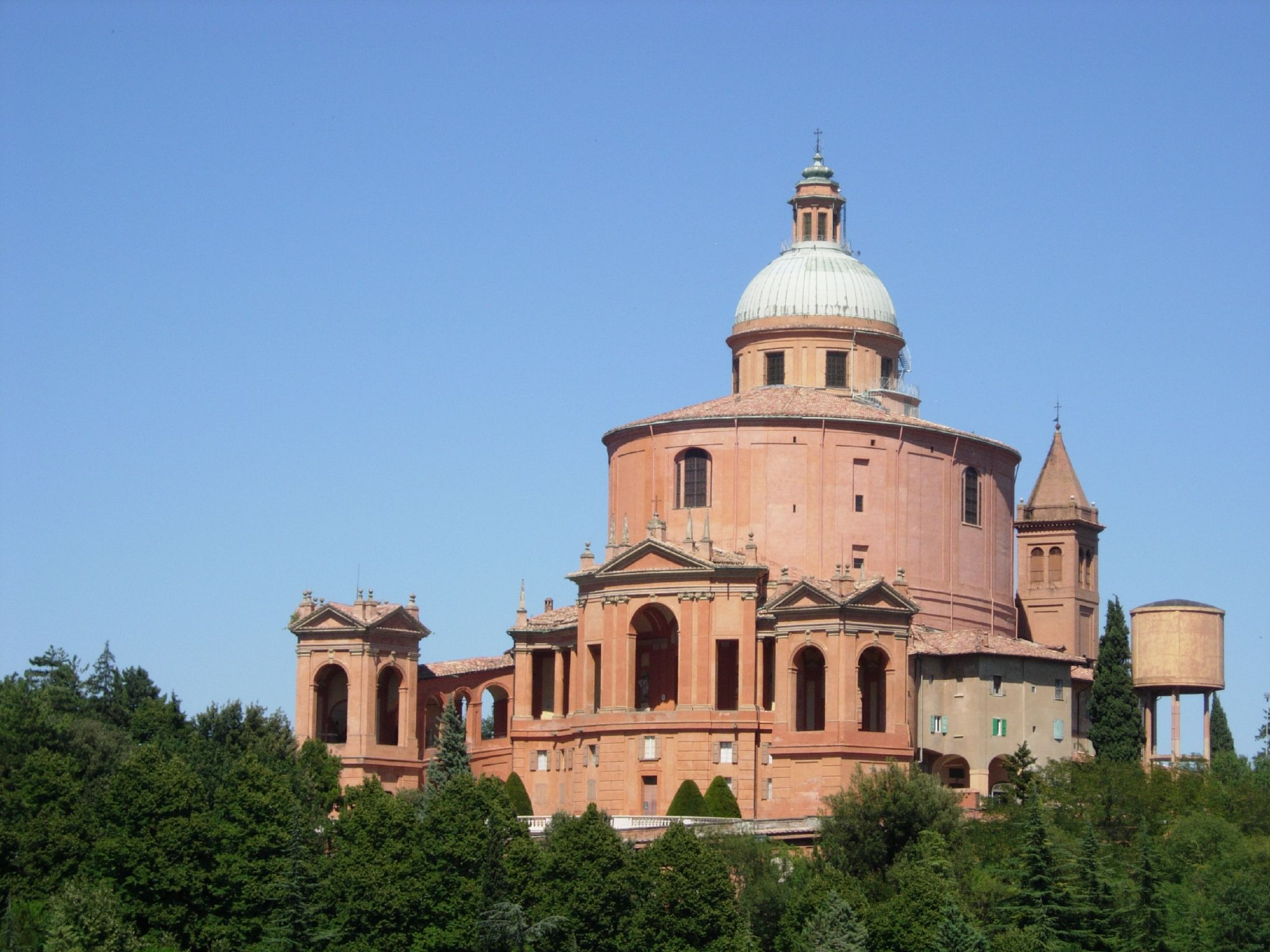
Sanctuary of the Madonna di San Luca, Bologna

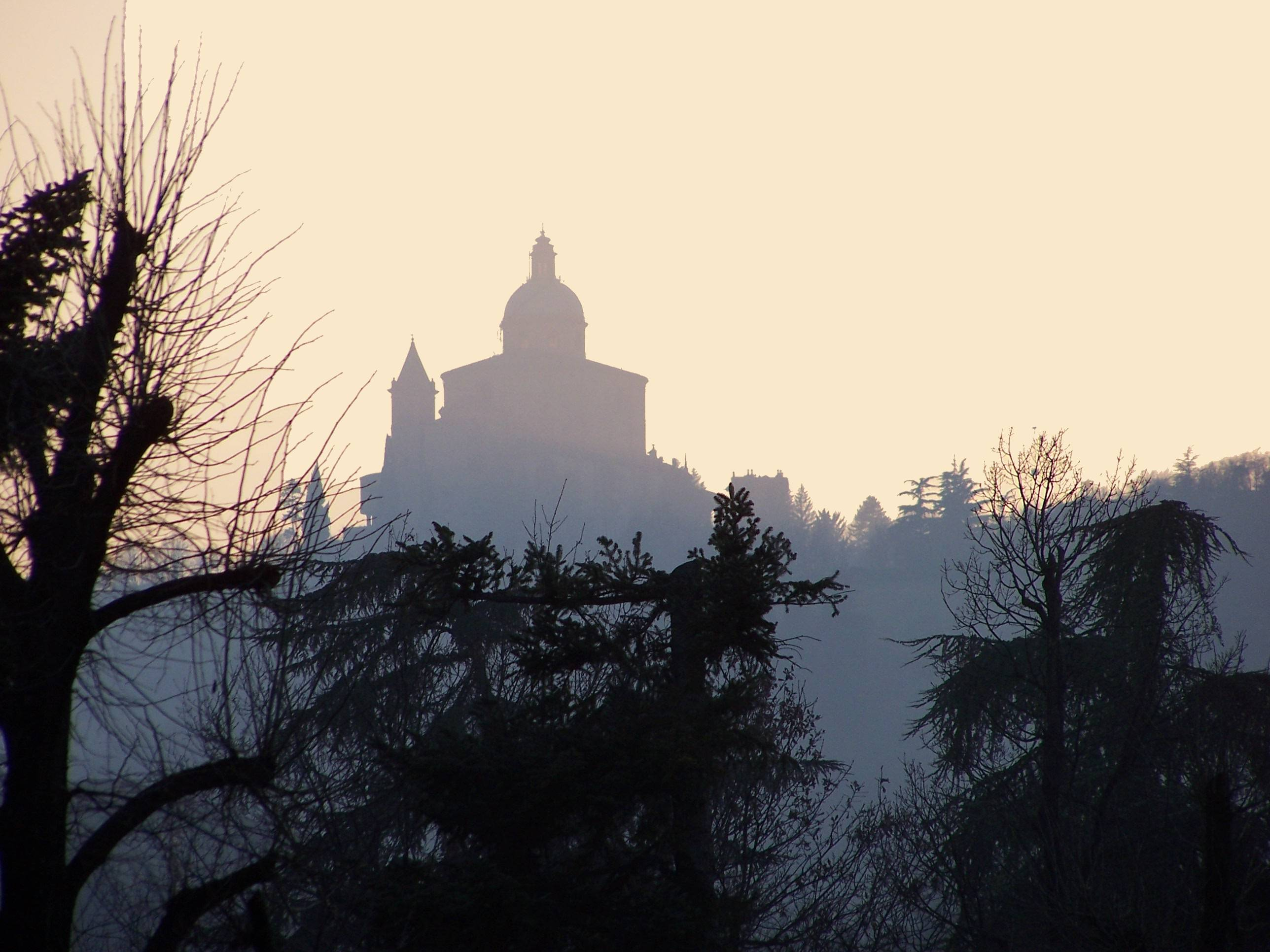
Another view of the Sanctuary of San Luca

Carlo Francesco Dotti (31 December 1669 – 3 June 3 1759) was an Italian Baroque architect from Bologna. Together with Alfonso Torreggiani and the Galli da Bibiena, he was one of the most important architects in the first half of the 18th century in Bologna, and he developed a resolute and innovative Baroque style.

== Life ==
Carlo Francesco Dotti was born in Piazza Santo Stefano, Bologna. He was the son of the architect Giovanni Paolo Dotti (fl. 1659–70). His major works are the Arco del Meloncello and the sanctuary of Madonna di San Luca, which formed one of the main ecclesiastical complexes in Bologna. A competition was held in 1714 for an arch to provide a pedestrian passage across the Via Saragozza; Dotti’s design, uniquely, was a two-storey structure that spanned the road. The original drawing (Bologna, State Archives) shows the arch straight in plan; the executed work (1718–32), however, was doubly curved in plan and is asymmetrical, with one side concealing adjacent buildings. These scenographic features may suggest the involvement of Dotti’s contemporary, the stage designer Francesco Galli Bibiena.

The Arco del Meloncello gives access to a porticus, originally 3 km long, now of 666 arches, which leads up the Monte della Guardia to the sanctuary (1723–57), where it forms a doubly curved gallery similar in appearance to the Arco and ending in pentagonal stair pavilions that form the entrance portico of the church. The church has a Greek-cross plan with apsidal ends, probably based on Santi Luca e Martina (begun 1634), Rome, by Pietro da Cortona, although the separate sanctuary possibly links it to the first, unexecuted, design (1660–62) for Santa Maria in Campitelli, Rome, by Carlo Rainaldi; the free-standing columns articulating the spaces, however, are in the early 17th-century Bolognese manner of Giovanni Magenta. The design was selfconsciously scenographic, with the single drum, rising above the more complex base, dominating the hillside.

In 1731 Dotti became architect to the Senate of Bologna, at a time of retrenchment. The church of San Domenico (1728–32), the convent of San Giovanni Battista dei Celestini (1729–54; since altered) and the library of the Academy of Sciences of the Institute of Bologna (1738) all had interiors in the early 17th-century Bolognese style, with lateral windows, plain walls and free-standing columns. Dotti’s private works were also modest in scope and included the monumental double staircase (1735) of the Palazzo Davia Bargellini, executed by Alfonso Torreggiani, renovations (1736–8) to the Palazzo Monti, and the façade (after 1740) of the Palazzo Agucchi, designed in the Bolognese manner with an arcaded ground floor. Outside Bologna, he worked on the restoration of San Giovanni (1733–7), Minerbo, and San Sebastiano (1745), Cento, near Ferrara.

In 1743 Dotti was invited to submit a proposal for the reinforcement of the dome of St. Peter's Basilica, Rome. Dotti prepared two unexecuted designs (Bologna, Museo di San Petronio) for the east façade of the basilica of San Petronio, Bologna; begun in 1390 by Antonio di Vincenzo, San Petronio was still unfinished, and there was controversy between ‘classicists’ and ‘Goths’ over the correct way to complete it. Dotti produced a design to satisfy each: his first design (1748) was a development of Francesco Terribilia’s Gothic design of 1580; his second (1752) was in a mid-17th-century Roman style, with a façade articulated in depth by clusters of engaged columns.

Dotti died in Bologna on 3 June 3 1759, aged 89. His two sons also were architects: Giovanni Paolo (1707–55) collaborated with him and Giovanni Giacomo (1724–after 1792) published Dotti’s work.

== Writings ==
- Esame sopra le forze delle catene e braga con che si mostrano le bragature essere inutili per reggere l’urto degli archi e volte e come possa reggere la simplice catena horizzontale, posta nella sommita degli archi senza bragature, come anche tante fabbriche munite con dette catene a braga, che reggonsi fino al giorno d’oggi possano essere un’argomento forte, per dimonstrarle valide, come viene creduto da molti (Bologna, 1730).
- Scrittura volante sul proposito del nuovo teatro pubblico in difesa del sentimento di C.F. Dotti e del Torreggiani architetto, contro le opposizioni del sig. Antonio Bibiena inventore e direttore della fabbrica del nuovo pubblico teatro (Bologna [c. 1756]).

== Principal works ==
Arco del Meloncello, Bologna

- Madonna di San Luca, Bologna, 1723–1757
- Restoration of the Basilica of San Domenico (Bologna), 1728–1732
- Reading room of the library of the University of Bologna
- Palazzo Agucchi, now Palazzo Bosdari, Bologna
- Palazzo Monti, now Palazzo Salina, Bologna
- Palazzo Poggi, Bologna
- Project for the great stairway of the Palazzo Davia Bargellini, Bologna
- Design for the Colonna dell'Immacolata, Piazza Malpighi, Bologna
- Arco del Meloncello, Bologna, 1732
- Parish church of San Giovanni, Minerbio
- Restoration of Malatesta temple, Rimini
