= Porta Saragozza, Bologna =

Coordinates: 44.49049°N 11.329924°E

Porta Saragozza
- Cassero di Porta Saragozza
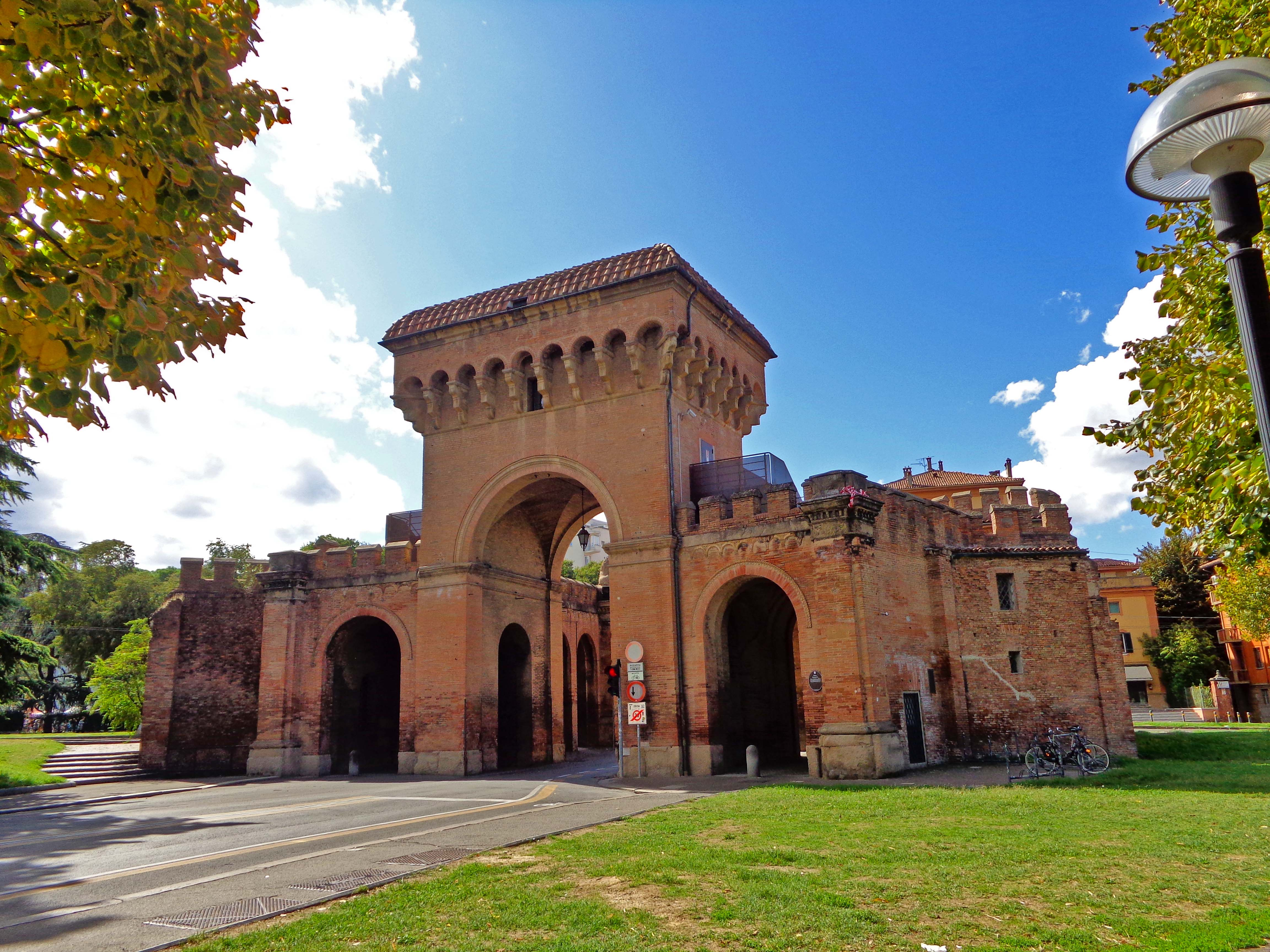
- Porta Saragozza in Bologna
- Interactive map of Porta Saragozza
- Periods: Middle Ages
- Location: Bologna, Emilia-Romagna, Italy

History
- Built: 12th–13th century

Site notes
- Condition: Restored
- Public access: Yes

The Porta Saragozza is one of the historic gates in the medieval walls of Bologna, Italy.

Constructed between the 13th and 14th centuries, the gate was equipped by 1334 with a drawbridge spanning a surrounding moat. For several centuries, the gate saw limited use. However, in 1674, the construction of the long Portico di San Luca—which connects the city center to the Basilica della Beata Vergine di San Luca—transformed its role. The gate became the starting point for the annual religious procession of the sacred icon to the sanctuary, and was thereafter also known as the Porta Sacra or Porta dei Pellegrini (Holy Gate or Gate of the Pilgrims).

In 1859, concordant with a rising movement to restore medieval remnants in Italian cities, the architect Giuseppe Mengoli, replaced the mediaeval cassero with the present one by connecting it with two crenellated arches to the two lateral cylindrical great towers, giving it its present castle-like form.

About nine of the original twelve gates remain in the third set of circumvallating 14th-century walls (Cerchia del Mille) of Bologna. These include the Porta Maggiore (or Mazzini), Porta Castiglione, Porta Saragozza (this article), Porta San Felice, Porta delle Lame, Porta Galliera, Porta Mascarella, Porta San Donato, and Porta San Vitale.

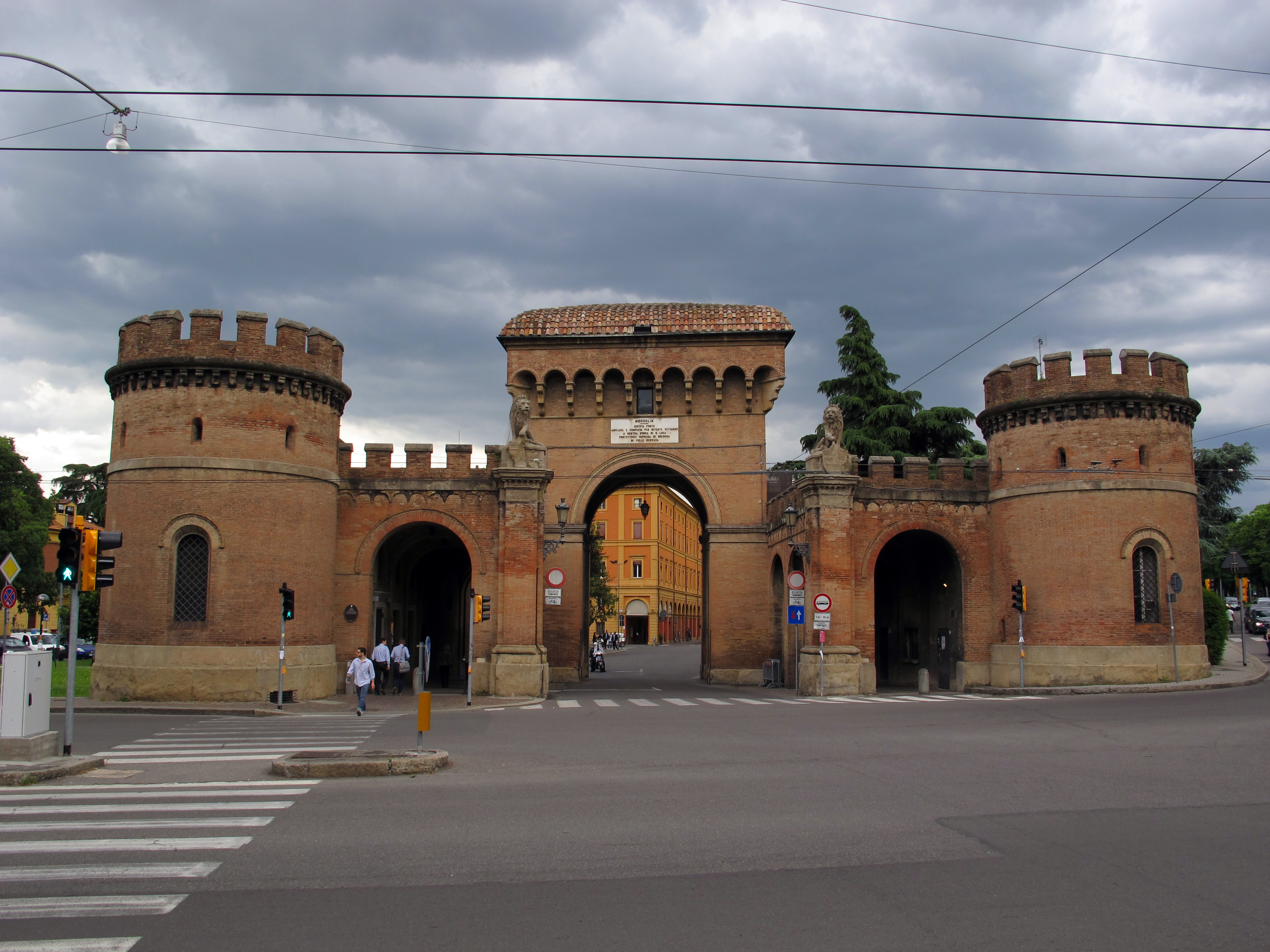
Porta Saragozza, Bologna

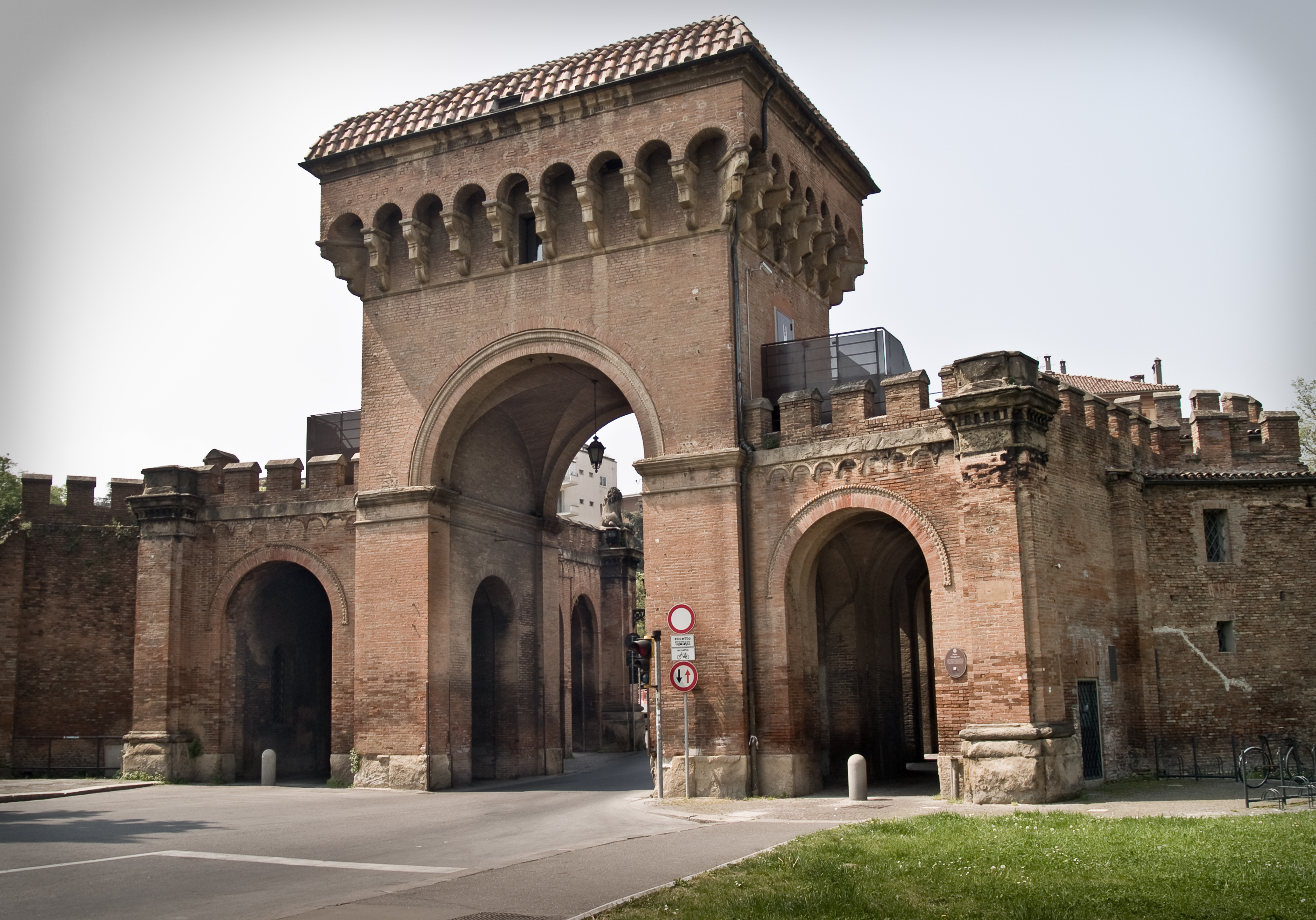
Porta Saragozza from another angle
