= Porticoes of Bologna =

UNESCO World Heritage Site
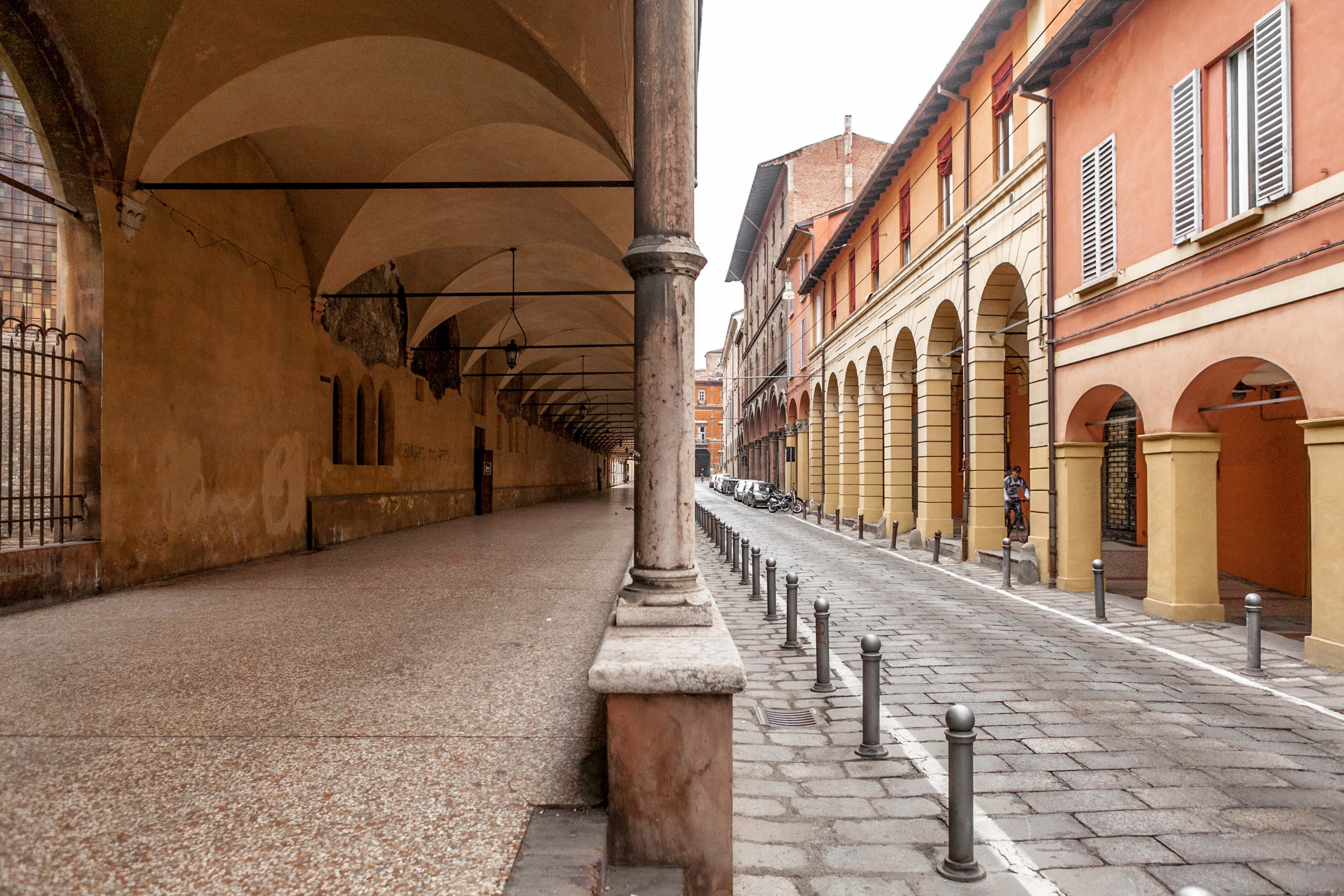

- Location within Emilia-Romagna Location within Italy
- Location: Bologna, Emilia-Romagna, Italy
- Criteria: Cultural: (iv)
- Reference: 1650
- Inscription: 2021 (44th Session)
- Area: 52.18 ha (0.2015 sq mi)
- Buffer zone: 1,225.62 ha (4.7321 sq mi)
- Coordinates: 44°29′29″N 11°19′58″E

The porticoes of Bologna are an important cultural and architectural heritage of Bologna, Italy and represent a symbol of the city together with the numerous towers. No other city in the world has as many porticoes as Bologna: all together, they cover more than 38 kilometres (24 mi) only in the historic centre, but can reach up to 53 kilometres (33 mi) if those outside the medieval city walls are also considered.

On account of their cultural and artistic significance, in 2021 the porticoes of Bologna have been declared a UNESCO World Heritage Site.

The porticoes of Bologna are similar to the Qi-lou (骑楼) widely found in the cities of southern China and the Gan-gi (雁木) found in the Japanese cities along the Japan Sea.

== History ==
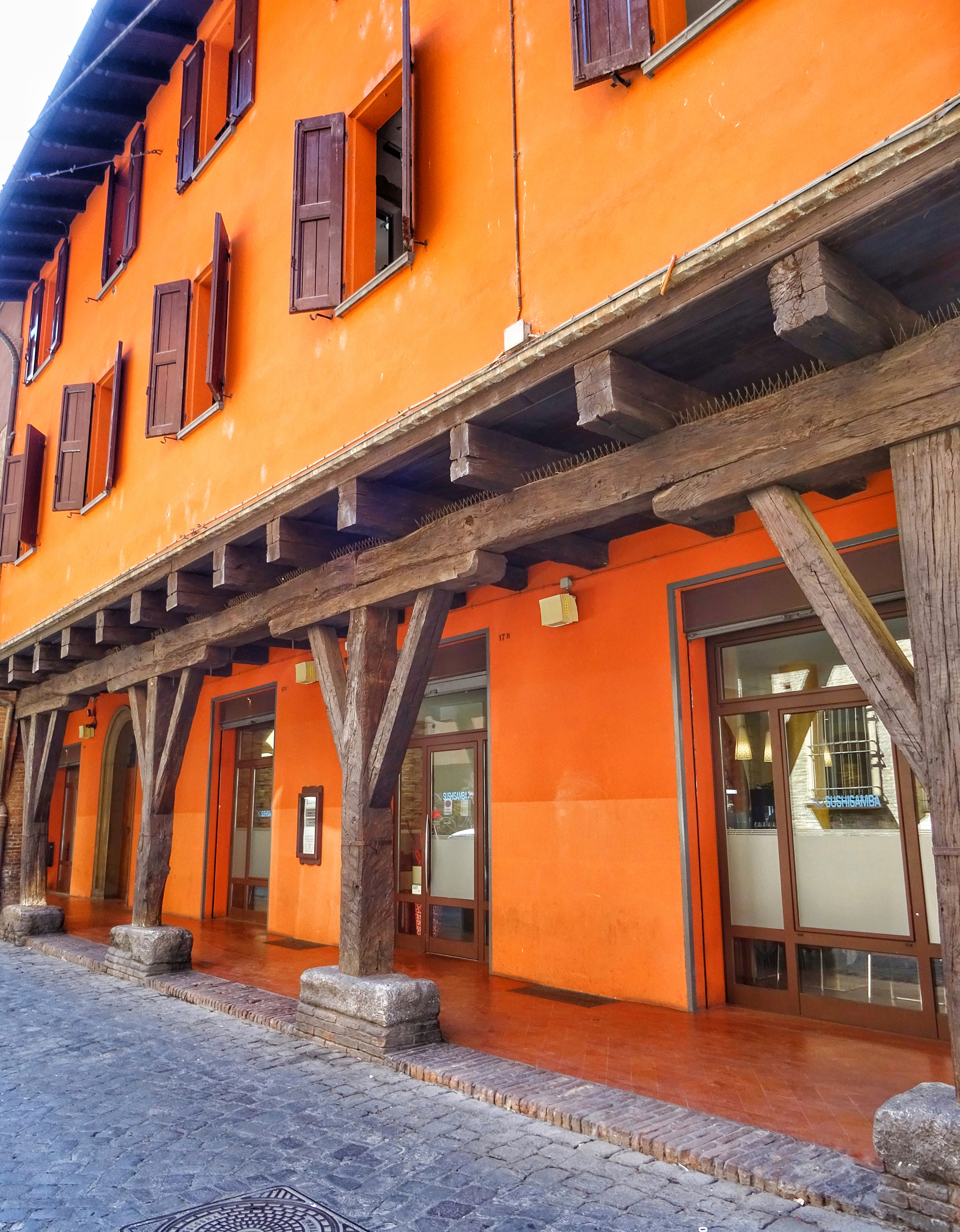
Wooden porticoes in via Marsala, an example of how early porticoes looked

The porticoes of Bologna were built almost spontaneously, probably in the early Middle Ages, as a projection of private buildings onto public land, in order to increase living spaces. The first historical evidence is from 1041. In a first period the houses were expanded by expanding their upper floors and the creation of wooden projections. Over the years, the jetties increased in size and it was necessary to build support columns beneath to prevent them from collapsing, thus creating the arcades.

In the following centuries, the arcades allowed buildings to accommodate the large influx of students and scholars at the University of Bologna and immigration from the countryside. The expansion of the porticoes began in 1288, when a notice from the local municipality established that all new houses had to be built with a portico, while those already existing that did not have one were required to add it. During all the Middle Ages, the arcades were made of wood, then, following a decree issued on 26 March 1568 by the pontifical governor Giovanni Battista Doria and the so-called gonfaloniere Camillo Paleotti, they were rebuilt with bricks or stones. Despite this, some buildings with wooden porticoes remain, like those in via Marsala or in Corte Isolani.

The Portico of San Luca is the world's longest. It connects Porta Saragozza (one of the twelve gates of the medieval walls encircling the old city) with the Sanctuary of the Madonna di San Luca. The windy 666 vault arcades are almost four kilometres (3,796 m or 12,454 ft) long. Its porticos provide shelter for the traditional procession which every year since 1433 has carried a Byzantine icon of the Madonna with Child attributed to Luke the Evangelist down to the Bologna Cathedral during the Feast of the Ascension.

== Gallery ==
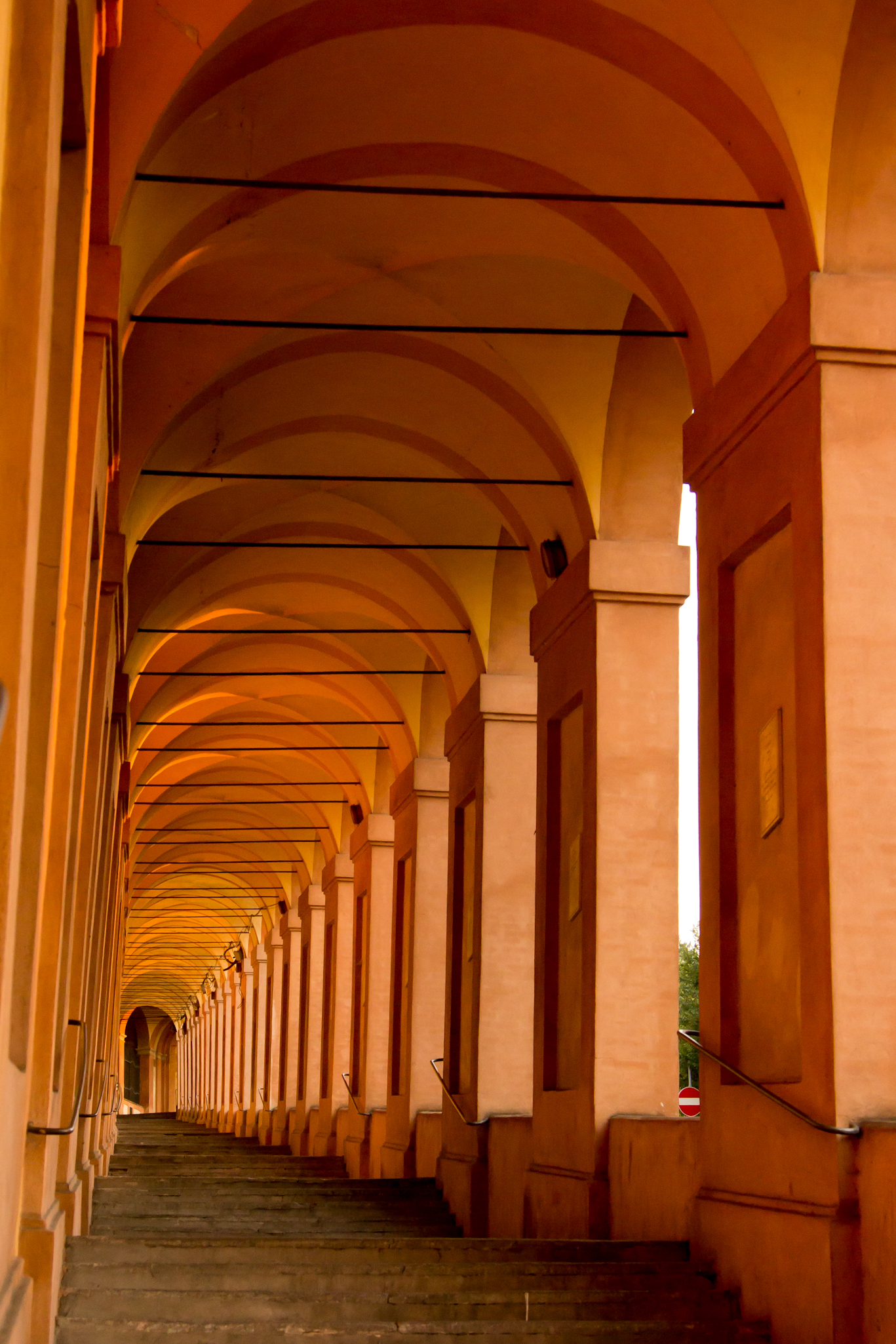
Portico of San Luca

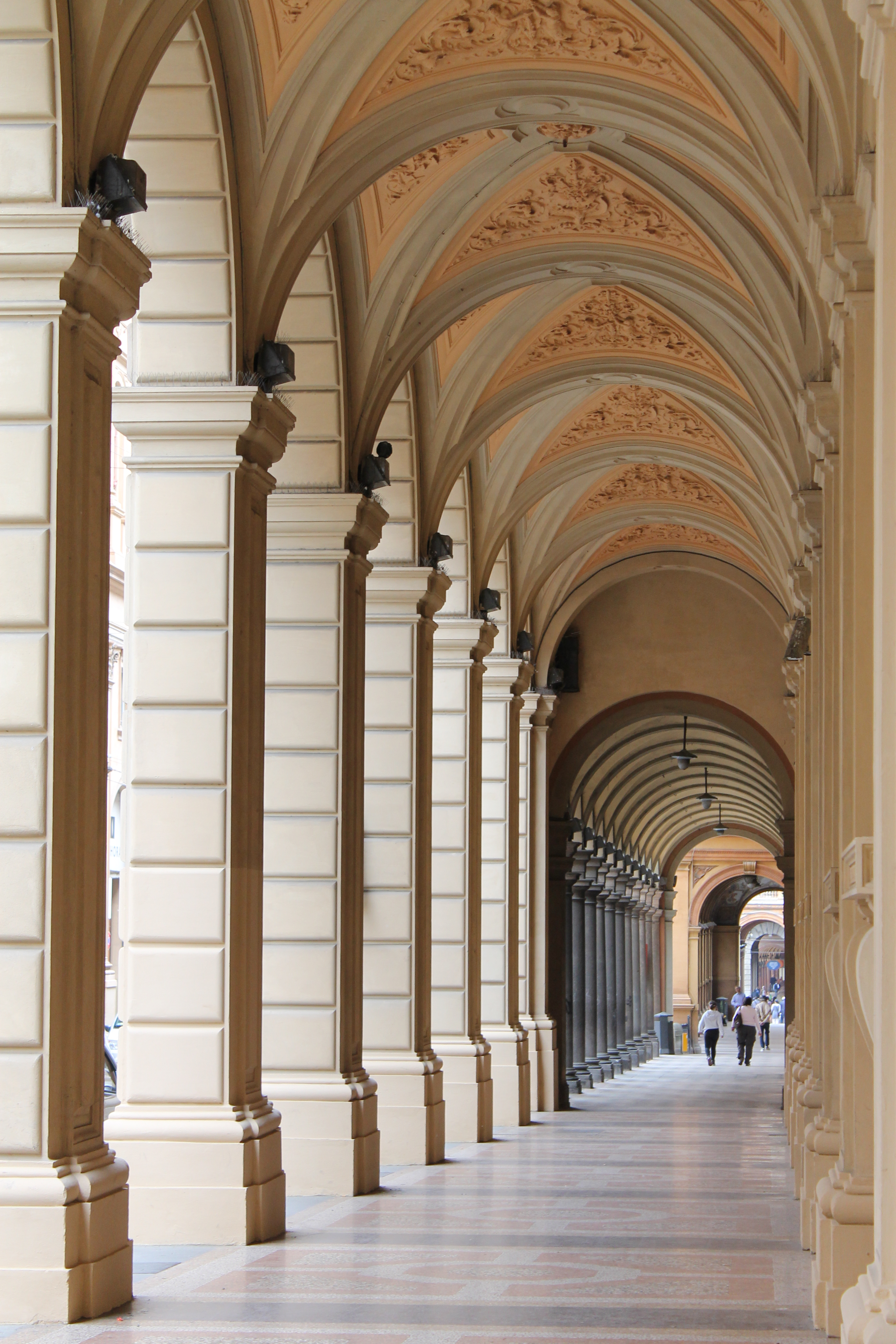
Porticoes in via Farini

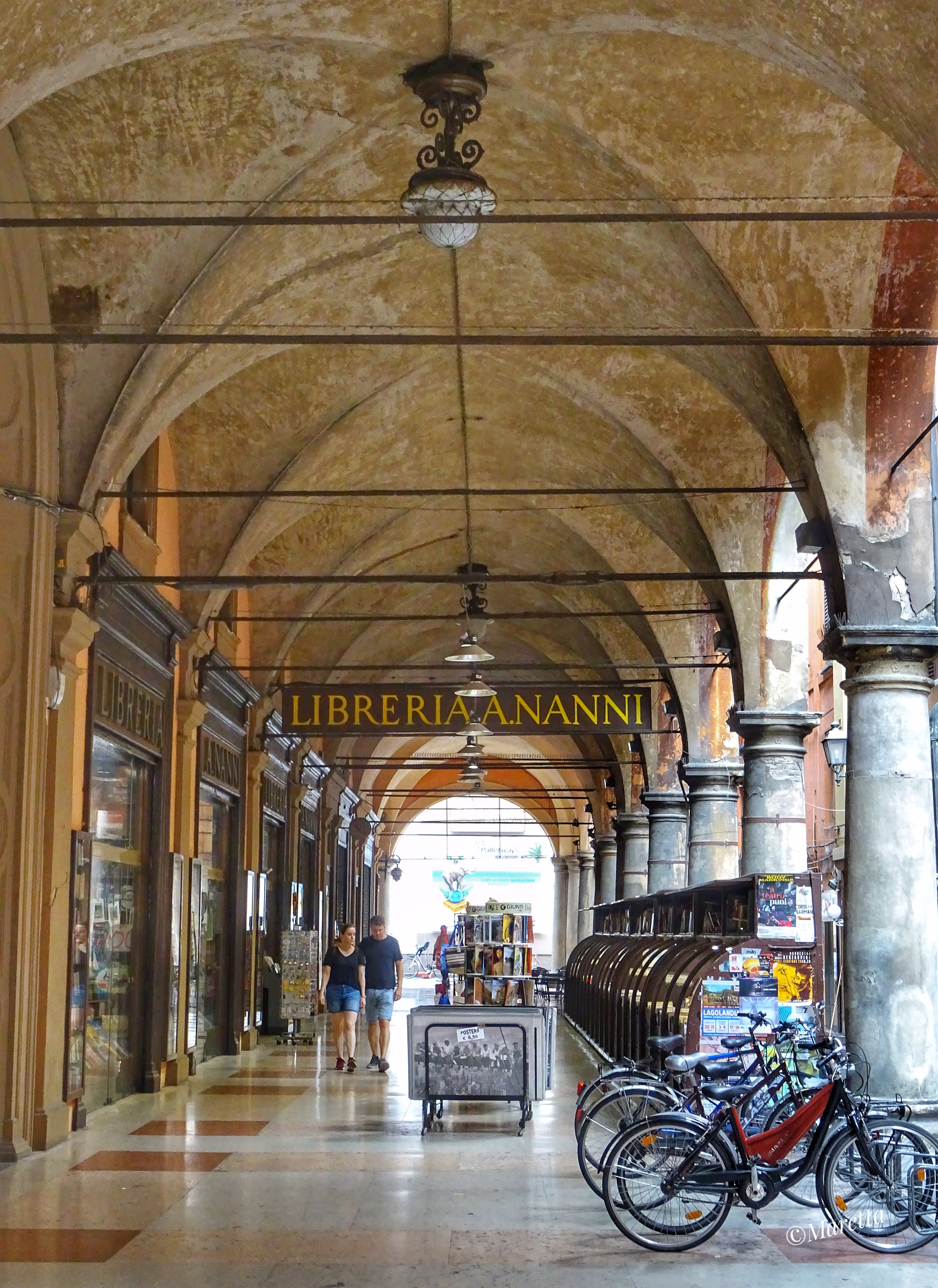
The "Portico of Death"

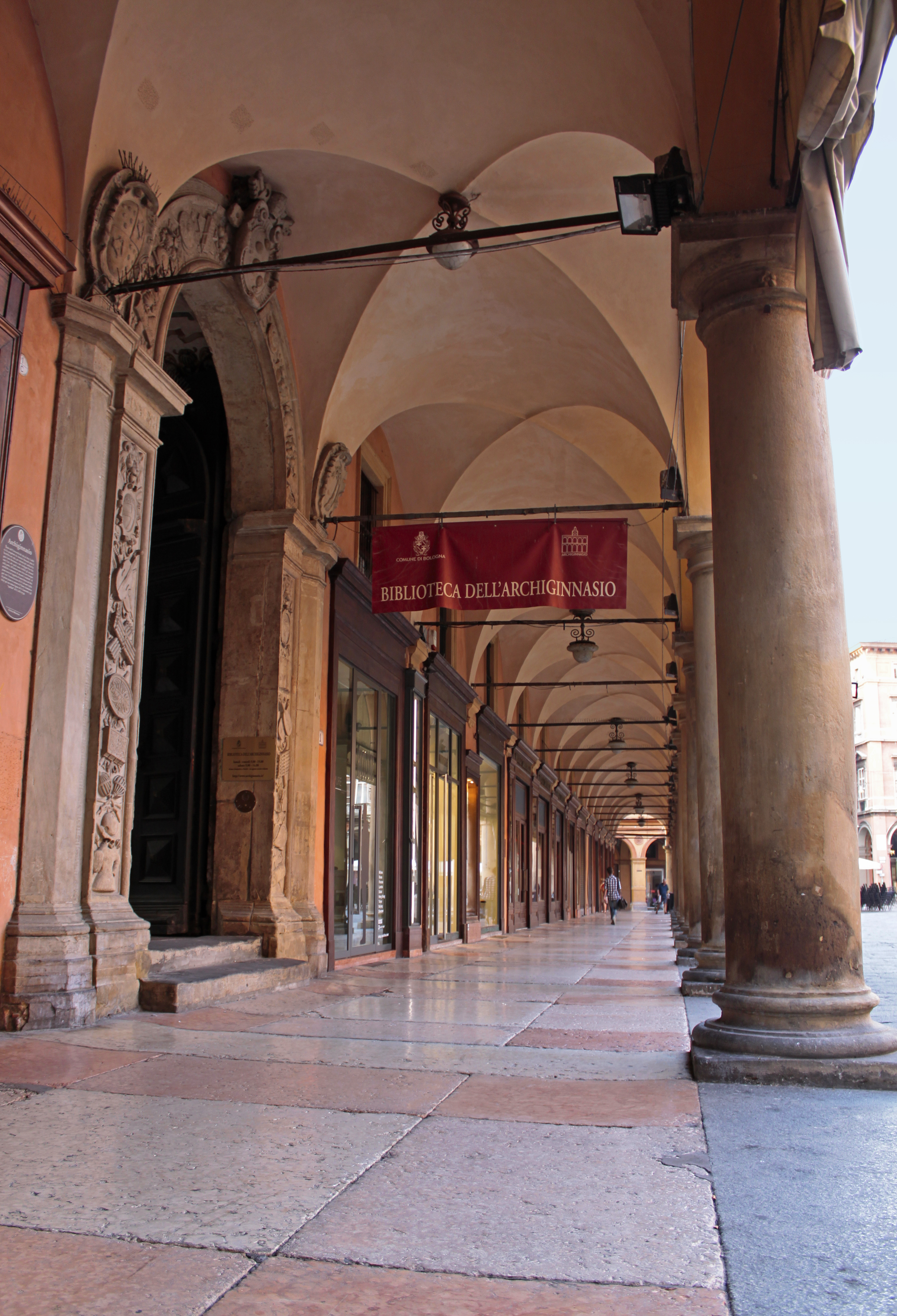
Portico of Pavaglione

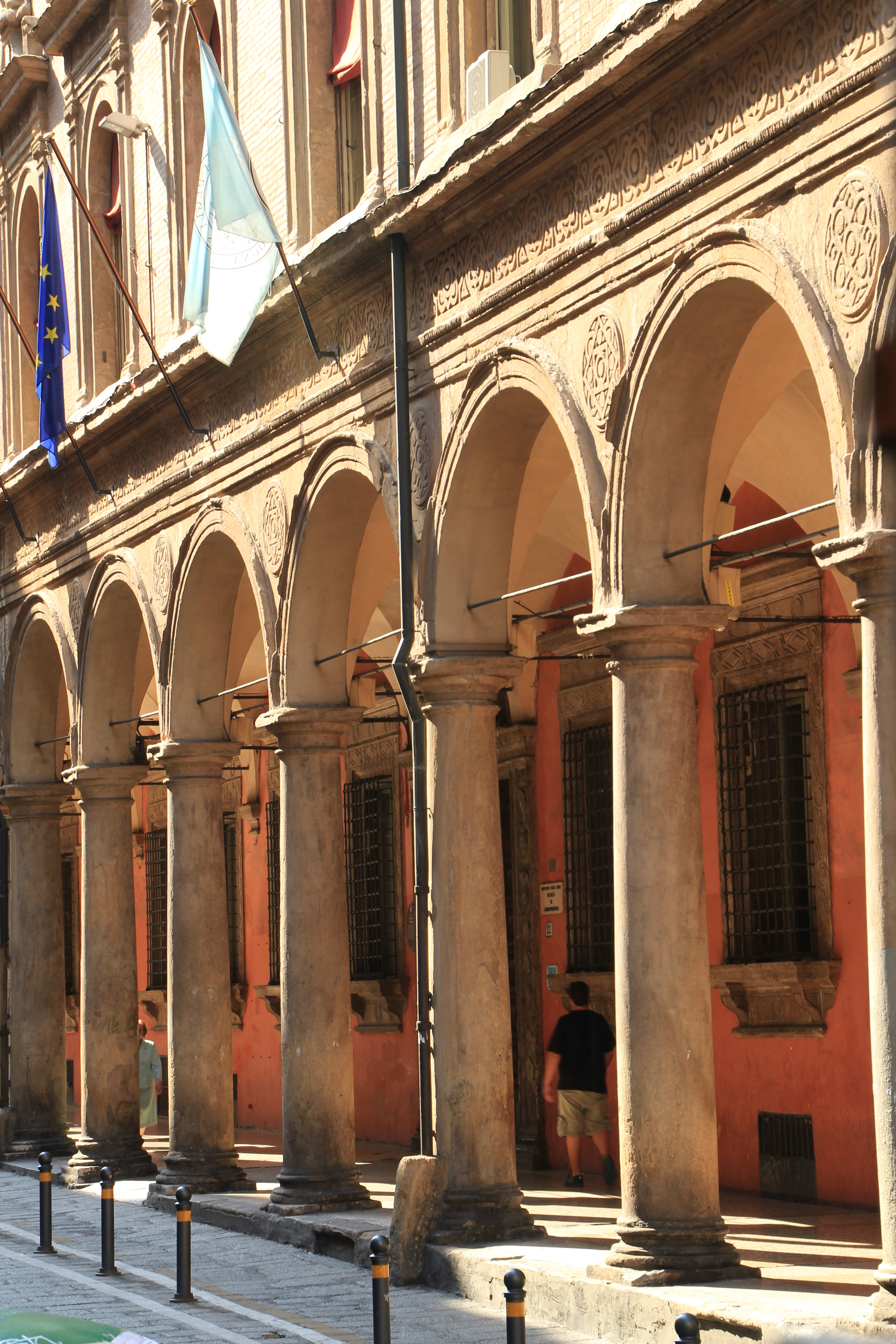
Portico of Malvezzi Campeggi Palace

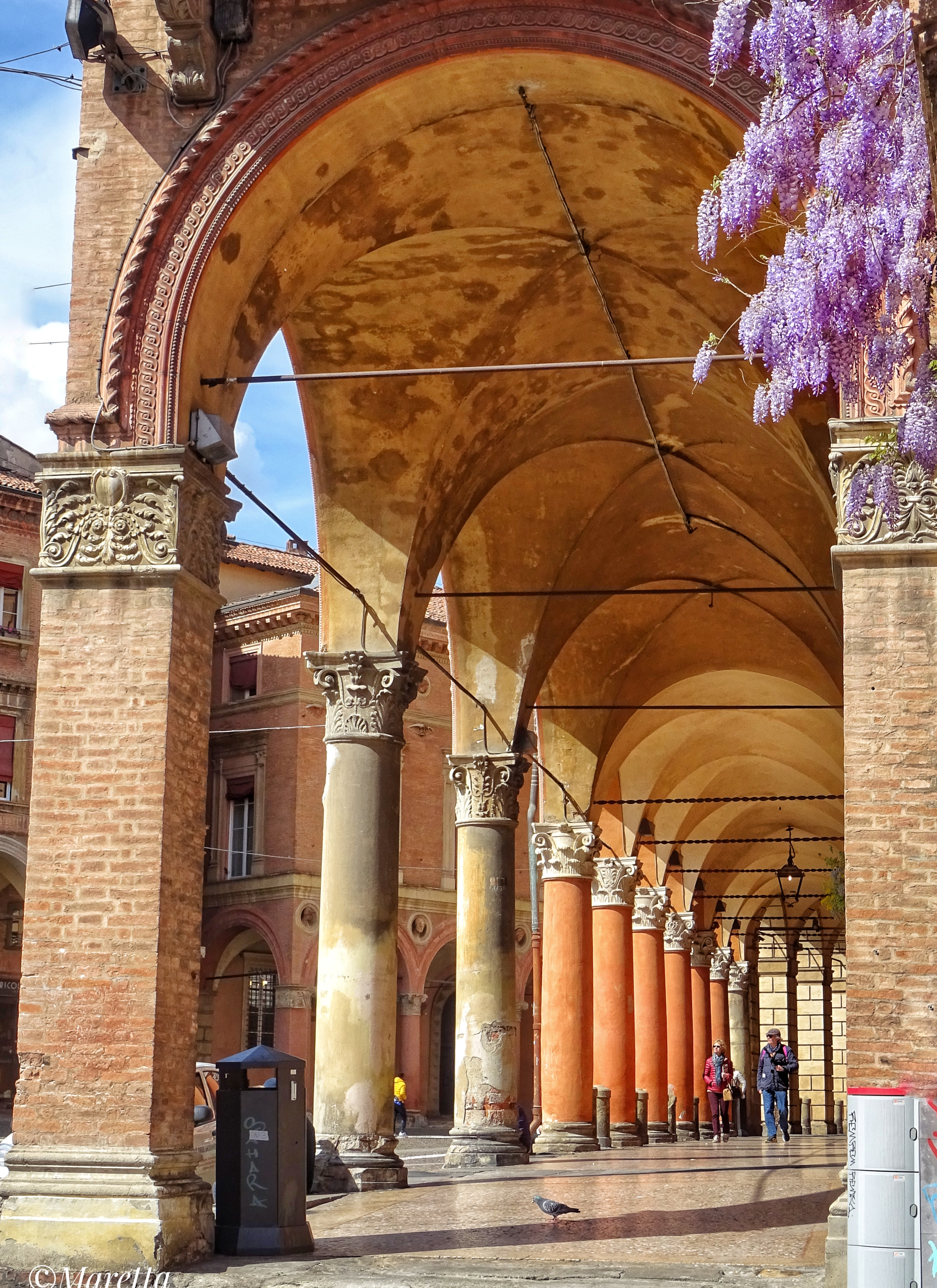
Portico of Bianchini Palace

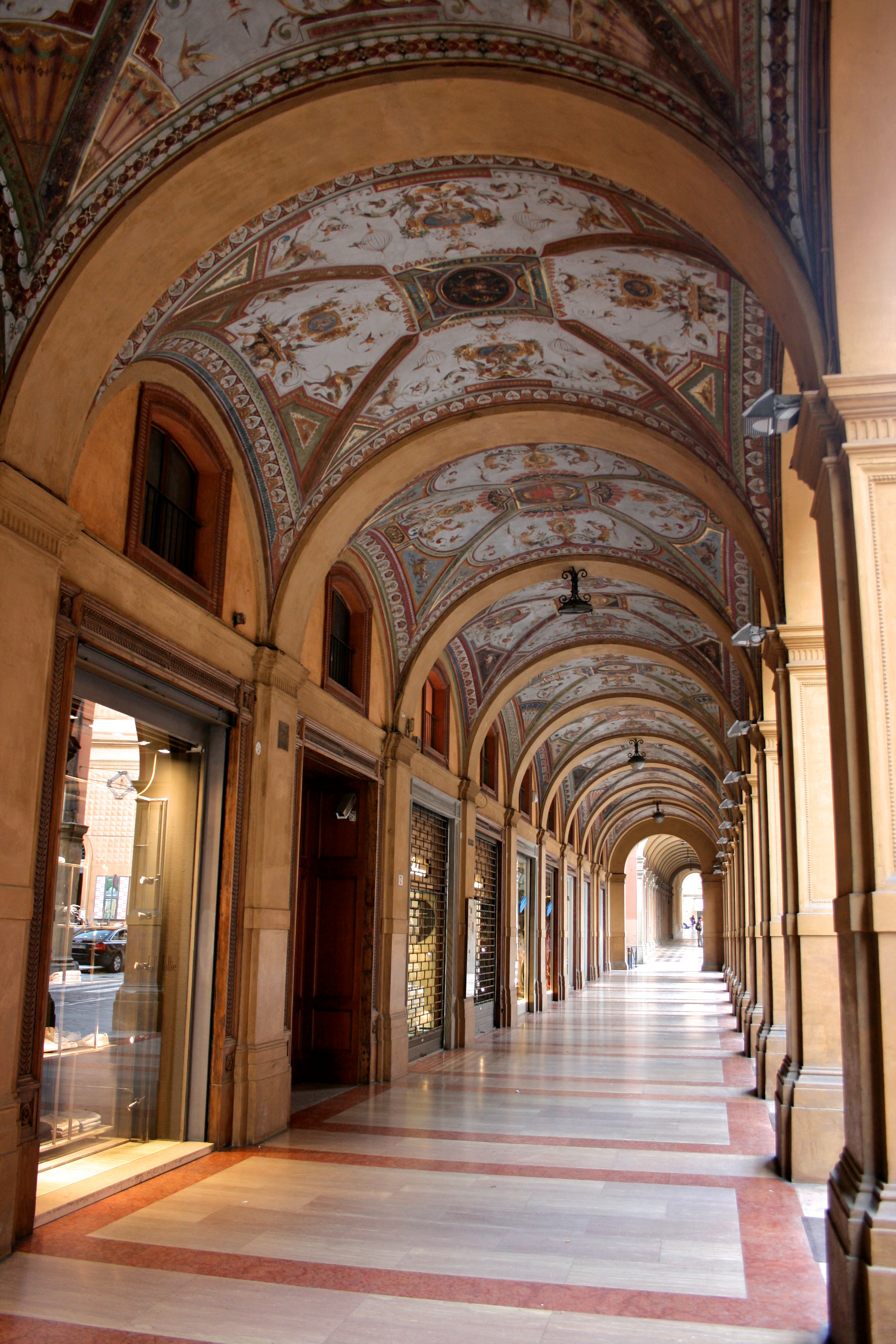
Portico of the Bank of Italy Palace

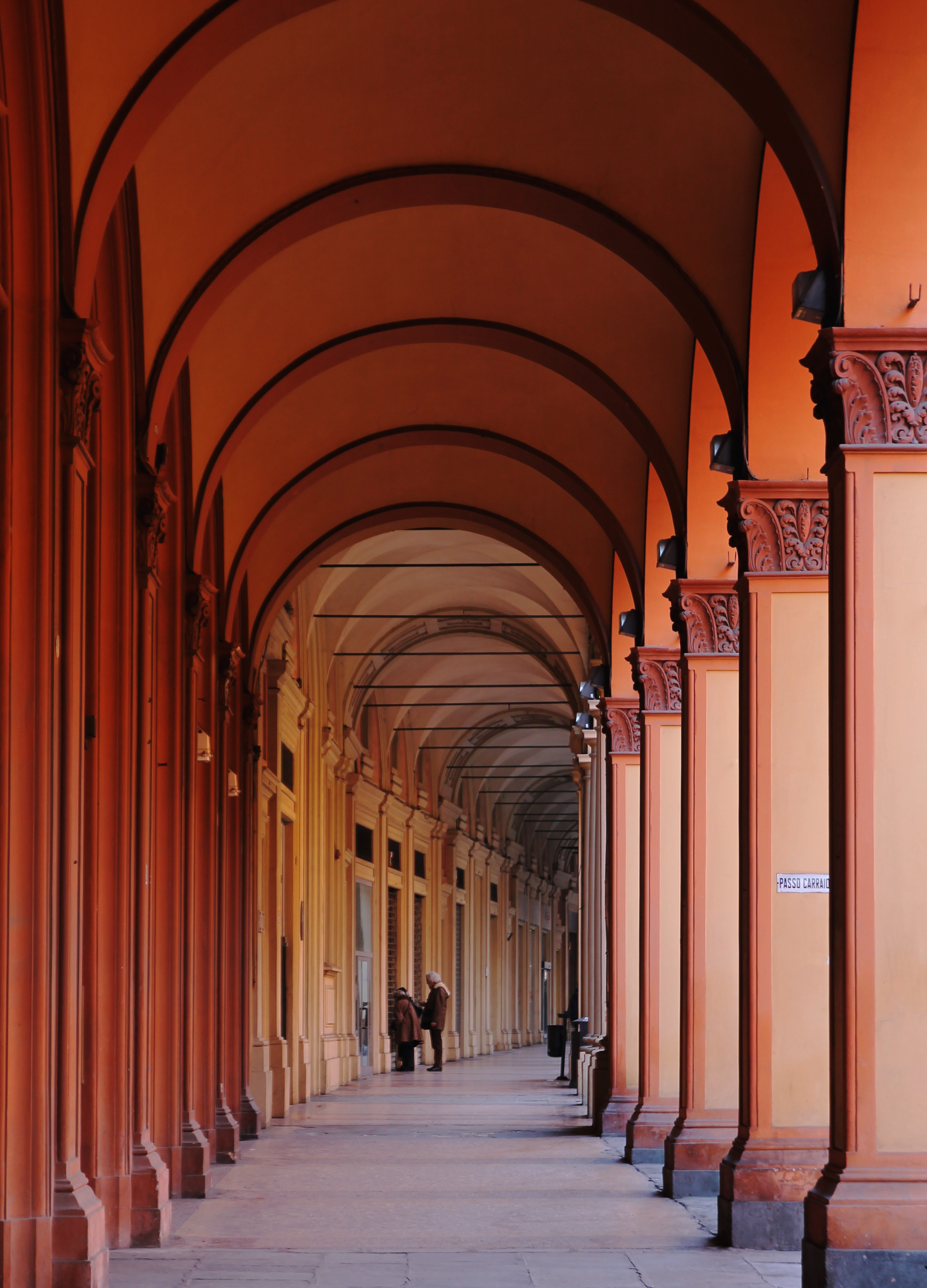
Porticoes in via Farini

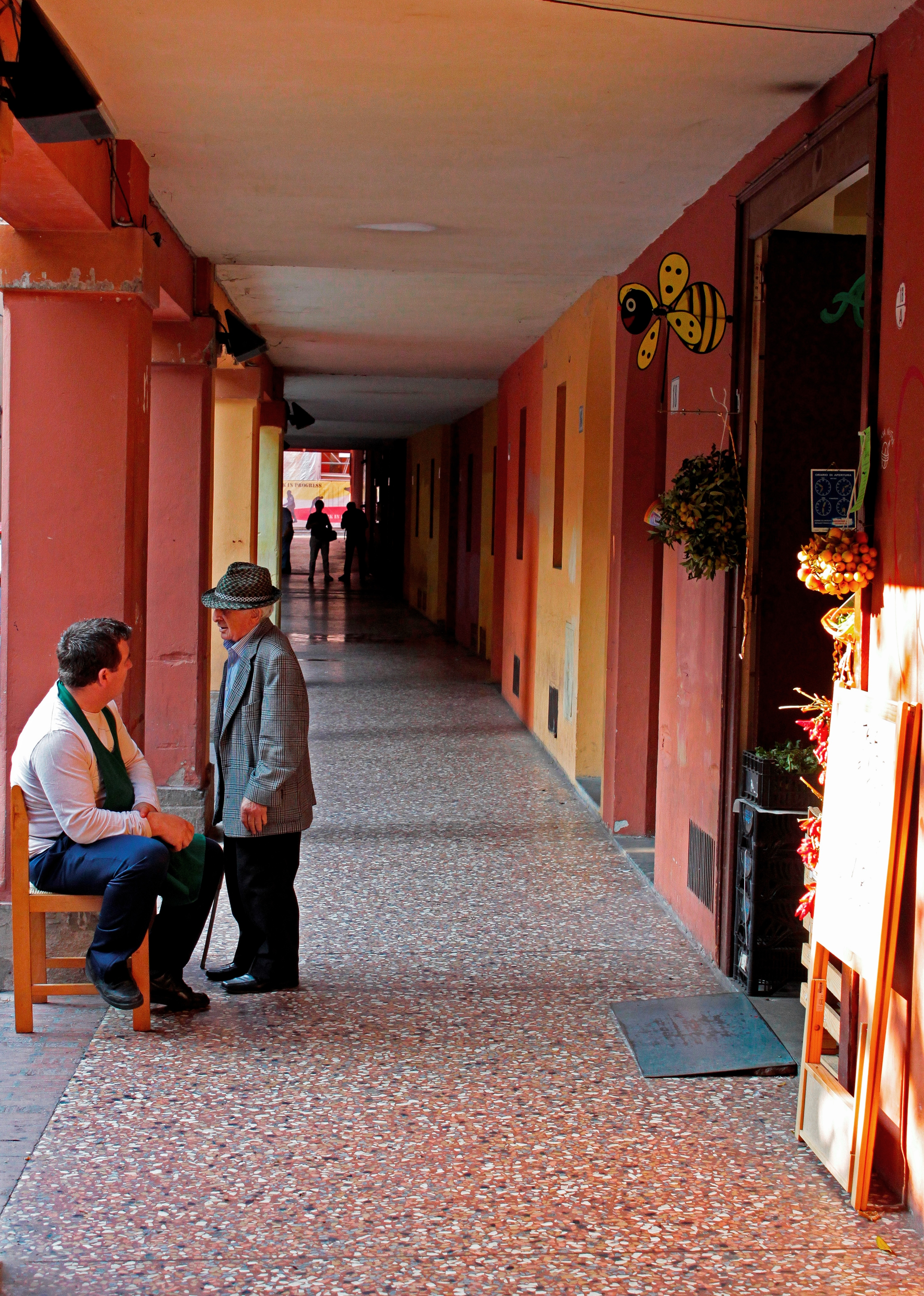
Porticoes in via San Leonardo
