= Palazzo Davia Bargellini, Bologna =

Coordinates: 44.4923°N 11.3519°E

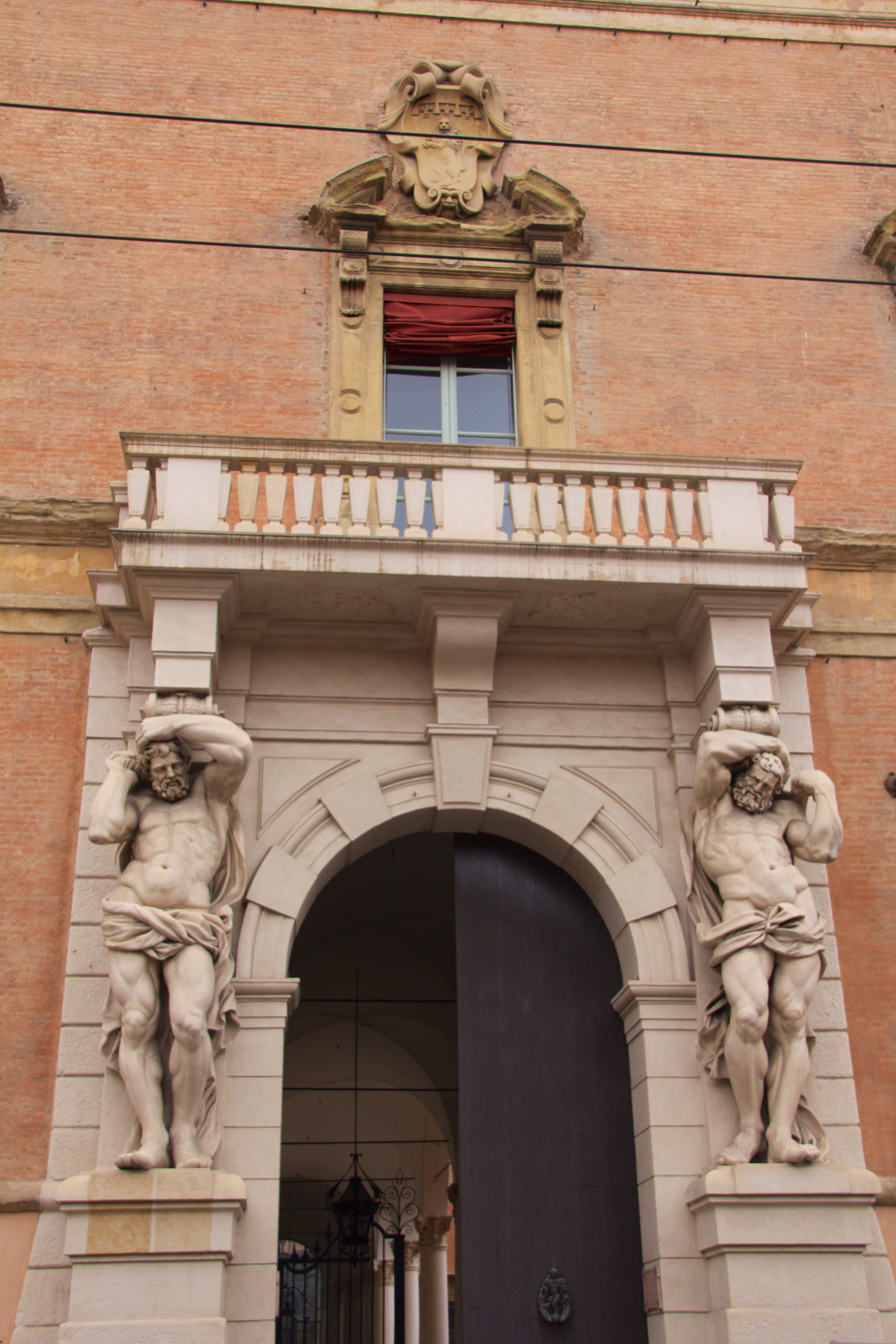
Entrance to the palace with telamons.

The Palazzo Davìa Bargellini is a Baroque style palace located on Strada Maggiore in central Bologna, Italy. It presently hosts the Civic Museum of Industrial art and Davìa Bargellini Gallery, which is an eclectic collection of paintings as well as applied arts and functional ornamentation, described as curiosities of the old Bologna. The diverse applied art collection includes ceramics, liturgical robes, keys, ornamental door knobs, marionettes from street theaters, furniture, iron grille work, elaborately carved wooden frame, and a gilded carriage.

== Palace ==
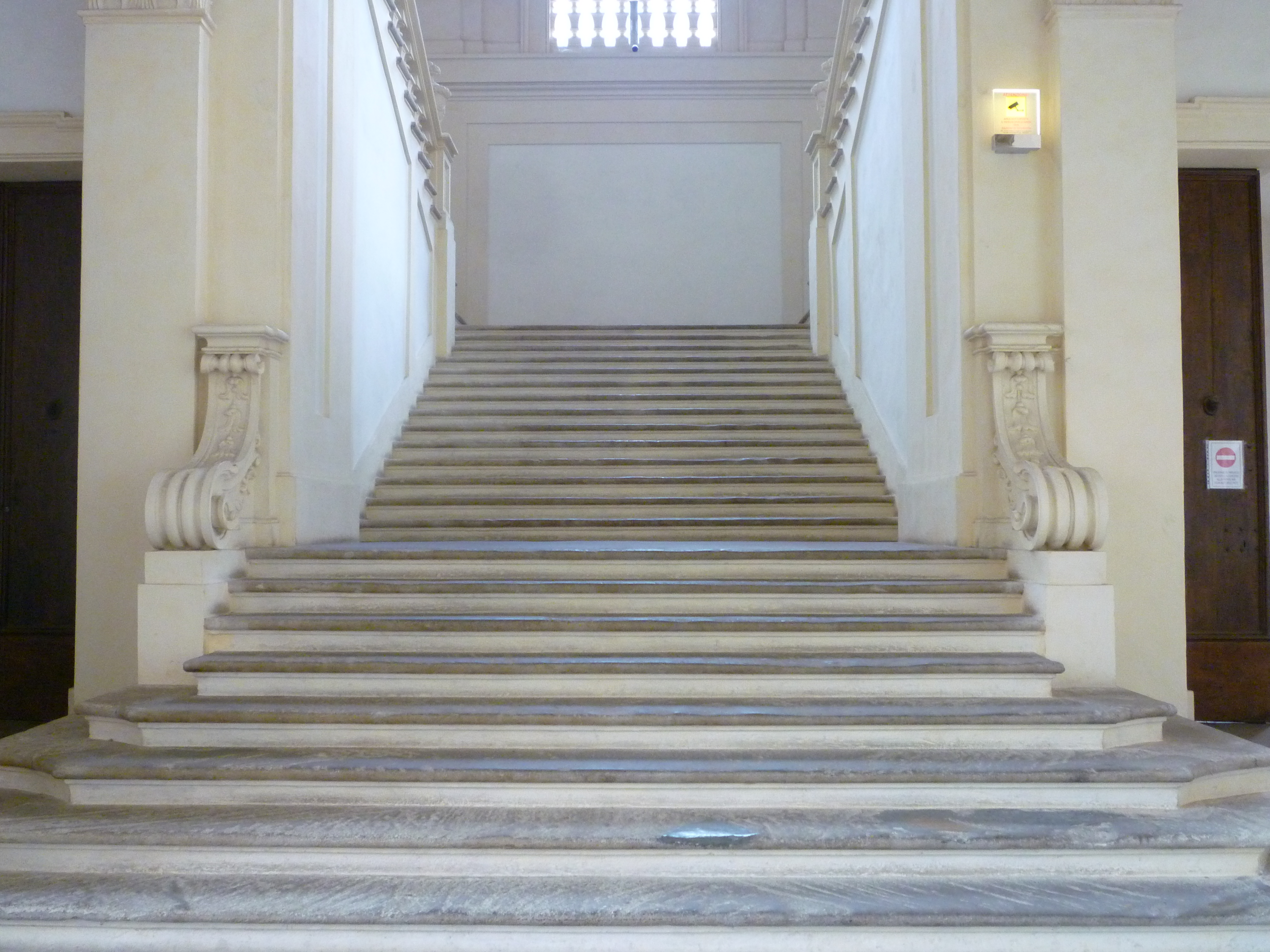
Internal staircase

Construction of the palace was commissioned in 1638 by Camillo Bargellini of a Bolognese Senatorial family. The architect was Bartolomeo Provaglia, and building was directed by Antonio Uri. A notable feature of the palace entrance are the two flanking telamons, locally called giganti or giants. These were sculpted in 1658 by Gabriele Brunelli and Francesco Agnesini. The scenic entrance stairwell was designed in 1730 by Carlo Francesco Dotti and Alfonso Torreggiani.

After a feud between the Bargellini family and the Ariosto family in the late 17th century, that led to both families' extinction, the Davìa family inherited the name, property and money of the Bargellini. In 1839–1874, the Davìa family occupied the palace. The last member left everything to public institutions.

The idea of a museum was forwarded in 1924 by the then owner and Superintendent of Galleries, Francesco Malaguzzi Valeri, in part to display the collection of paintings assembled by the Davìa Bargellini families, and his personal collection of applied art. It became a "Museum of "Industrial Art".

== Collections ==
The painting collection is varied and includes works from medieval age through the 19th century, from icons to portrait miniatures. Artists represented include Vitale da Bologna with a Madonna dei Denti, Simone dei Crocifissi with a Pietà con Giovanni da Elthinl (1368), Cristoforo da Bologna with a Madonna and Child, Jacopo di Paolo with a St John the Baptist, and Michele di Matteo with a St John the Evangelist. Other artists in the collection include Marcantonio Franceschini, Bartolomeo Cesi, Alessandro Tiarini, Prospero Fontana and his daughter Lavinia, Giuseppe Maria Crespi and his son Luigi. There are portraits of the Bargellini family by Bartolomeo Passerotti.

Among the sculpture represented is the bust of Virgilio Bargellini by Vincenzo Onofri, statuettes by Giuseppe Maria Mazza and Angelo Gabriello Piò, and the rich collection of figures for presespi (crèches).

The Berlin-type carriage likely had more than one owner, and while engraved with the heraldic shield of Filippo de Angelis (1792–1872), it likely previously belonged to the Pepoli family.
