= San Giovanni Battista dei Celestini =

Church in Bologna, Italy

Coordinates: 44.492178°N 11.341776°E

San Giovanni Battista dei Celestini is a Renaissance-style Roman Catholic church and located on via D'Azeglio corner with Piazza De' Celestini in Bologna, region of Emilia Romagna, Italy.

== History ==
The Celestine order established itself in Bologna in 1368 at the request of Antonio Galluzzi. Under his patronage, they built a monastery and church, dedicated to St John the Baptist. The monastery extended to Via San Mamolo. In 1482, the church had become the home of the parish. In 1535–1554, it underwent reconstruction in its present general layout. In 1560–1561, the convent was rebuilt. In 1580, a bell tower was added. The church underwent a further reconstruction Carlo Francesco Dotti and Francesco Tadolini during the 18th century.

In 1797, the Celestines were suppressed, but it continued to act as a parish church until 1806, when it was attached to a new parish centered a Santissimo Salvatore. It again became a parish in 1824, when the Canons Lateran retook the Salvatore church. The Celestini remained a parish church until 1987.

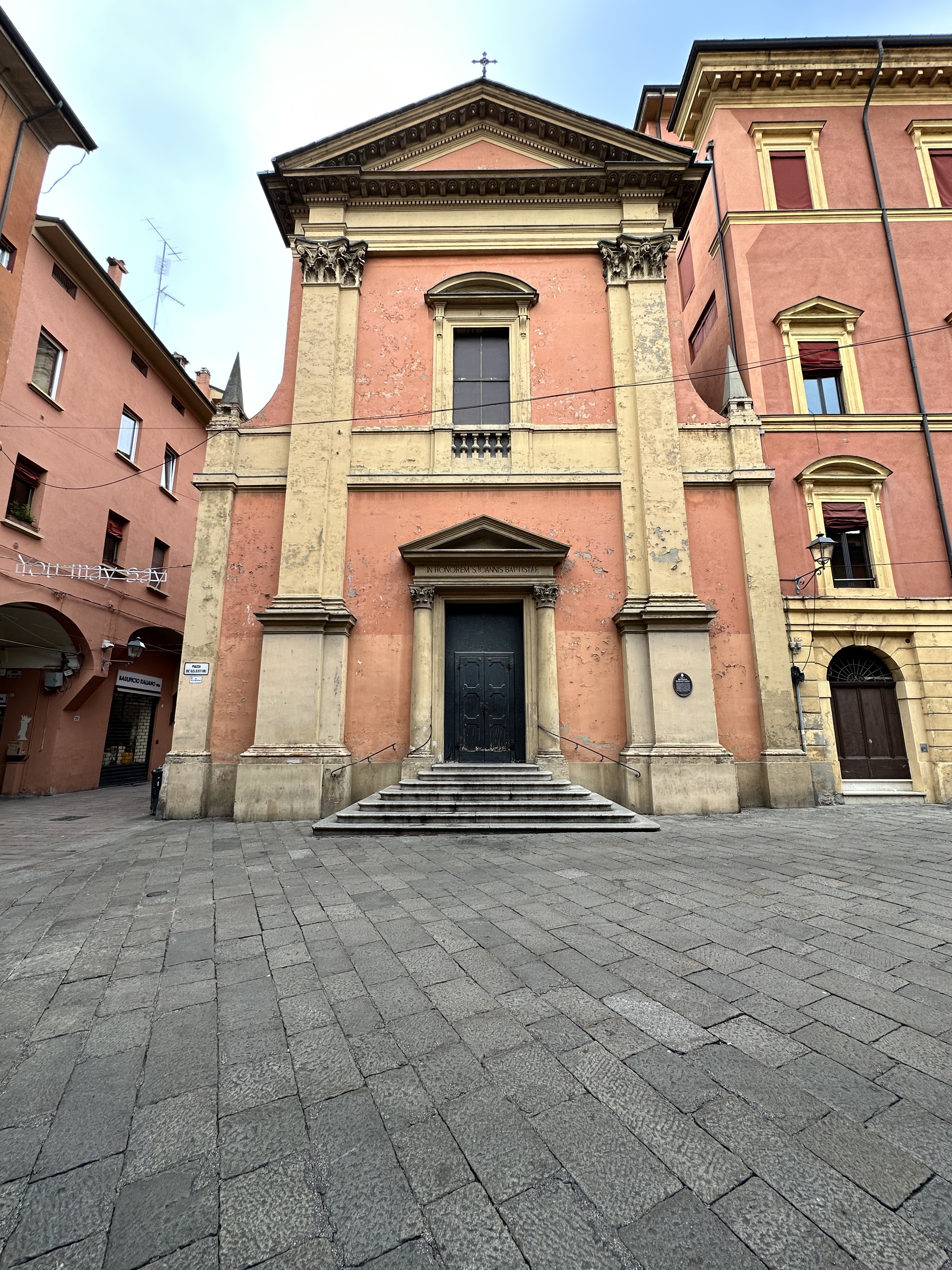
Façade of the Church

The convent has been used as a meeting hall for the Council of Thirty, and other government and public offices over the centuries. In 2011 it was also home to a state archive.
