= Porta Castiglione, Bologna =

Coordinates: 44°29′08″N 11°20′54″E

Porta Castiglione was a portal of the former outer medieval walls of the city of Bologna, Italy.

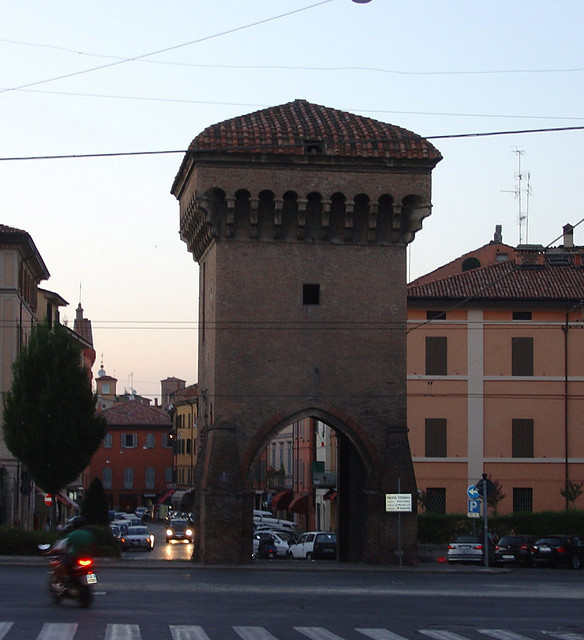
Porta Castiglione (view from outside former walls)

First erected in the second half of the 13th century, and rebuilt in the 15th century. The now isolated tower once was a machiocolated rampart in the city walls. The gate once stood beside the Savena Canal, which crossed the city and whose current fed hydraulic power to the city's cloth factories.
