= Madonna di San Luca, Bologna =

Basilica church in Bologna, Italy

Sanctuary of the Blessed Virgin of Saint Luke Santuario della Beata Vergine di San Luca (in Italian)
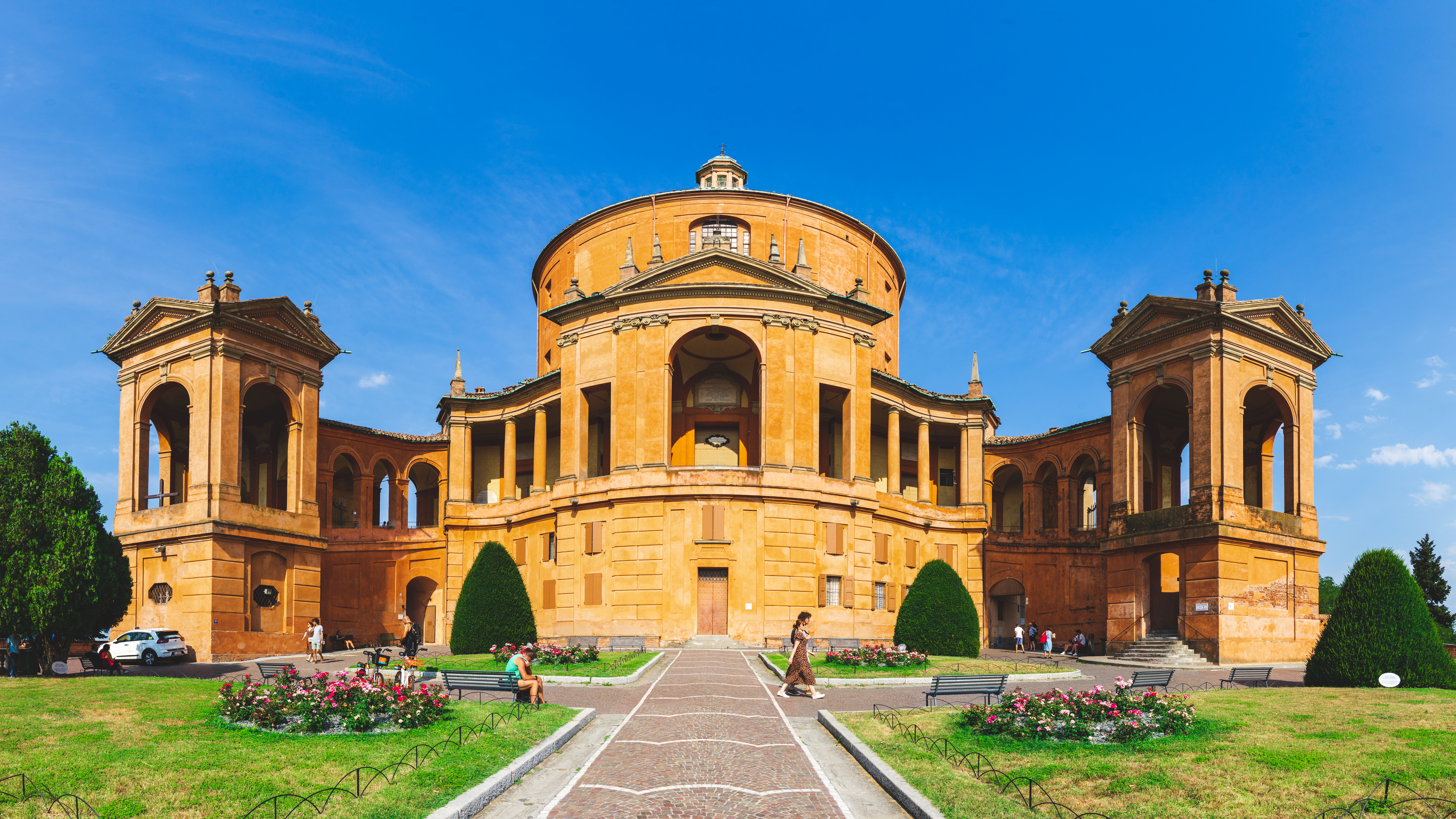
- The sanctuary of the Virgin of Saint Luke on the top of the Colle della Guardia

Religion
- Affiliation: Roman Catholic
- Ecclesiastical or organisational status: Minor basilica

Location
- Location: Bologna, Italy
- Interactive map of Sanctuary of the Blessed Virgin of Saint Luke; Santuario della Beata Vergine di San Luca (in Italian)
- Coordinates: 44.480°N 11.298°E

Architecture
- Architects: Carlo Francesco Dotti; Donato Fasano; Giovanni Antonio Ferri; Giovanni Giacomo Dotti; Angelo Venturoli
- Style: Baroque
- Groundbreaking: 1194
- Completed: 1765

Website
- www.sanlucabo.org

The Sanctuary of the Madonna of San Luca is a basilica church located in Bologna, northern Italy, situated atop the forested hill of Colle (or Monte) della Guardia, approximately 300 metres above the city plain, just southwest of the historical centre.

Although a modern road leads to the sanctuary, it is more traditionally accessed via a 3.8 km-long monumental portico consisting of 666 arches, constructed between 1674 and 1793. This covered arcade, part of the Porticoes of Bologna UNESCO World Heritage Site, was originally designed to shelter the annual procession of the sacred icon of the Virgin Mary from the cathedral in central Bologna to the sanctuary. Many of the arches were originally sponsored by prominent families, and some included icons or small chapels.

== History ==
A church or chapel existed on the hill for about a thousand years. Tradition holds that in the 12th-century, a pilgrim from the Byzantine Empire came to Bologna with an icon of the Virgin from the temple of Saint Sophia in Constantinople. In 1160, the bishop of Bologna Gerardo Grassi assigned the icon to a small hermitage-chapel atop the hill that was tended by two holy women, Azzolina and Beatrice Guezi. Construction of a church began in 1193. In 1294, some friars of the Dominican order from the monastery of Ronzano came to the site, and the order remained here until the Napoleonic suppression of 1799.

The present church was constructed in 1723 using the designs of Carlo Francesco Dotti. The lateral external tribunes were built by Carlo Francesco's son, Giovanni Giacomo, using his father's plans. The centrally planned sanctuary has painted artworks by Domenico Pestrini, Donato Creti (second chapel on right); Guido Reni (Assumption in the third altar on the right), Giuseppe Maria Mazza in chapel of St. Anthony of Padua, Vittorio Bigari (frescoes) and Guercino (sacristy). Stucco works are by A. Borelli and G. Calegari and statues by Angelo Piò.

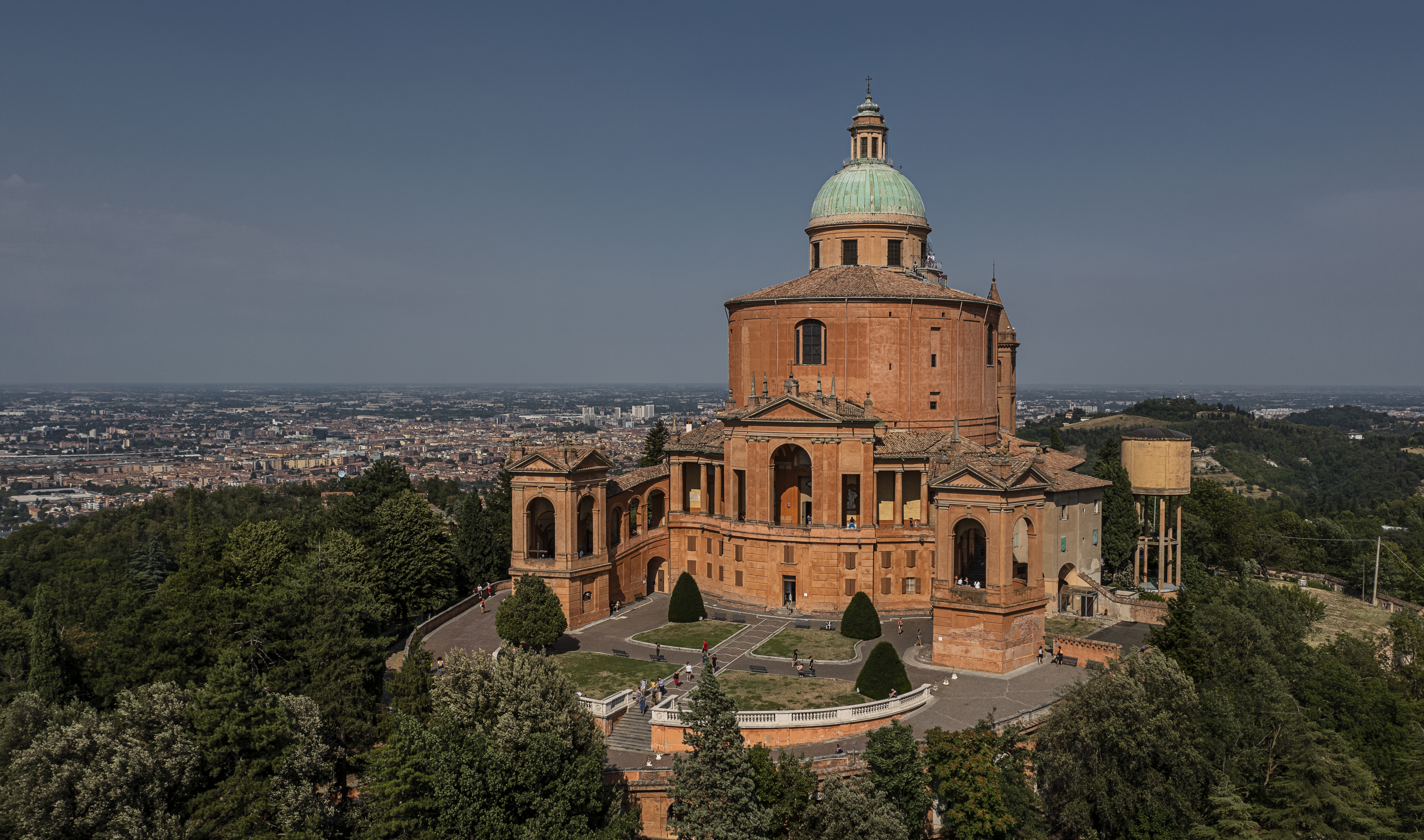
Panoramic view of Bologna from the Sanctuary

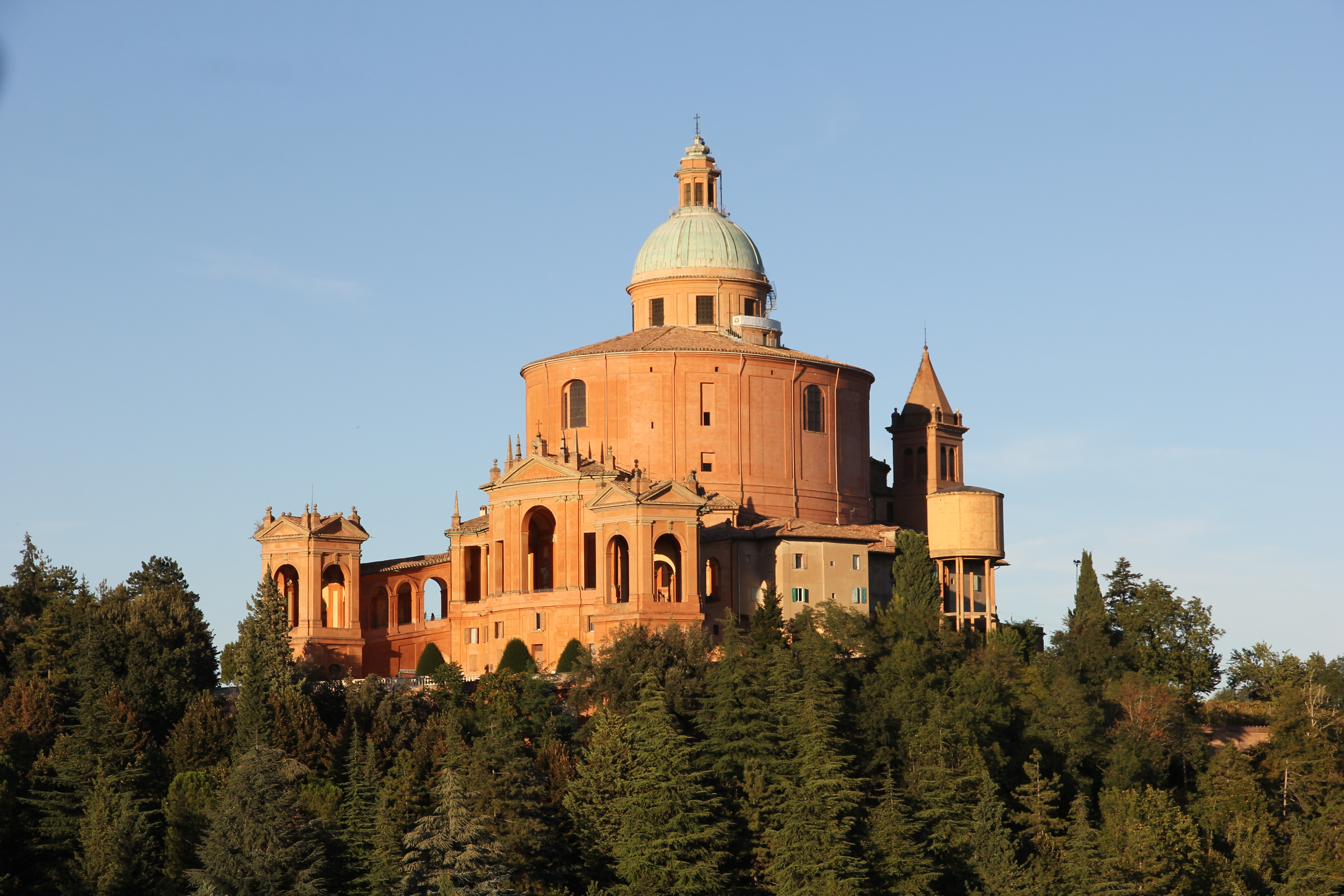
View of the Sanctuary della Madonna di San Luca

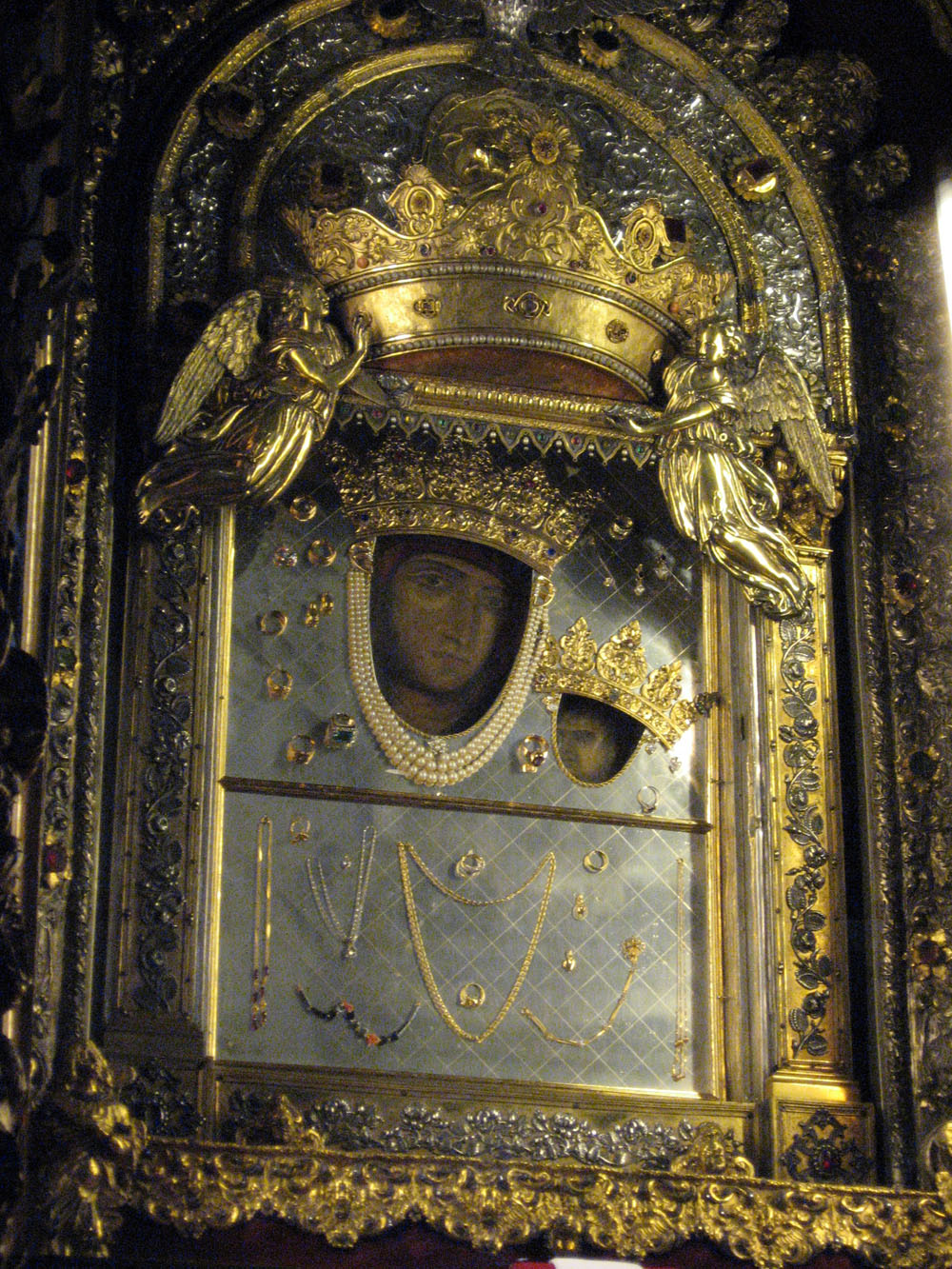
The icon of the Virgin Mary, traditionally attributed to Luke the Evangelist

== Cycling ==
The road leading up to the church is often used in professional cycling races. The Italian autumn classic race Giro dell'Emilia finishes on a circuit where the riders have to climb the road several times. It has also been used in the Giro d'Italia, where it made its debut in 1956 in an individual time trial stage won by Charly Gaul. The climb featured in the final part of Stage 2 of the 2024 Tour de France.

== Cable car ==
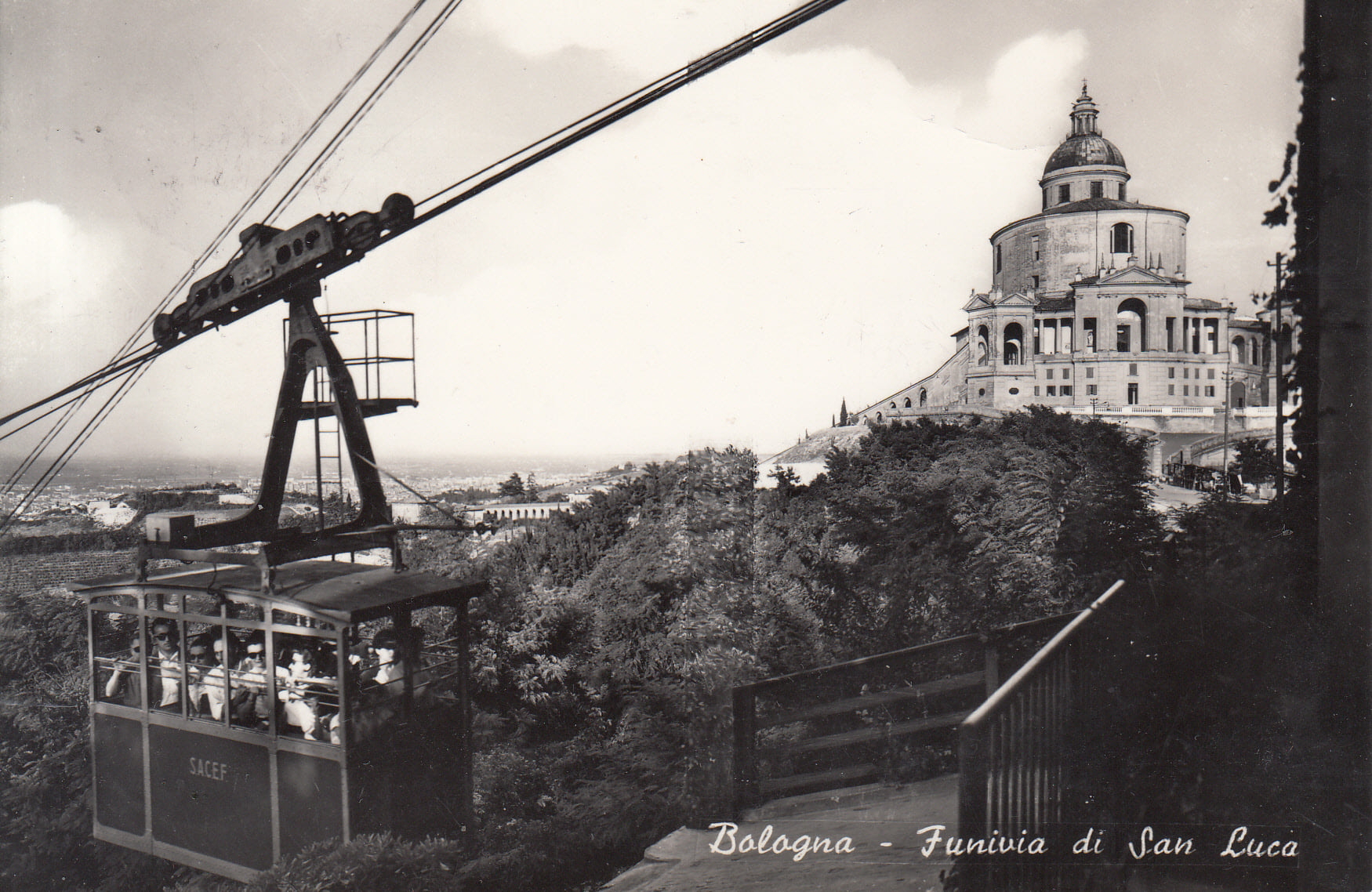
Cable car approaching the mountain station

From 1931 to 1976 an aerial cable car operated from the base of the hill on the outskirts of Bologna, to the summit. The total distance covered in the 7 minute travel time was 1328m with a vertical difference of 220m. The operation was closed due to increased usage of private transport to ascend the hill. The top station is abandoned but intact, the bottom station has been converted into apartments but remains structurally the same, and the single pylon remains intact in a field.

== Portico di San Luca ==
The Portico di San Luca is a monumental 3.8-kilometre covered arcade in Bologna, consisting of 666 arches. It links the historic city gate, Porta Saragozza, to the hilltop Sanctuary of the Madonna di San Luca on Colle della Guardia. Constructed between 1674 and 1793, the arcade was originally designed to shelter the annual religious procession in which the icon of the Virgin Mary is carried from the sanctuary to Bologna Cathedral.

It is widely recognized as the longest portico in the world and represents one of the most distinctive architectural and cultural landmarks of Bologna. In 2021, the Portico di San Luca was inscribed as part of the UNESCO World Heritage Site titled The Porticoes of Bologna.

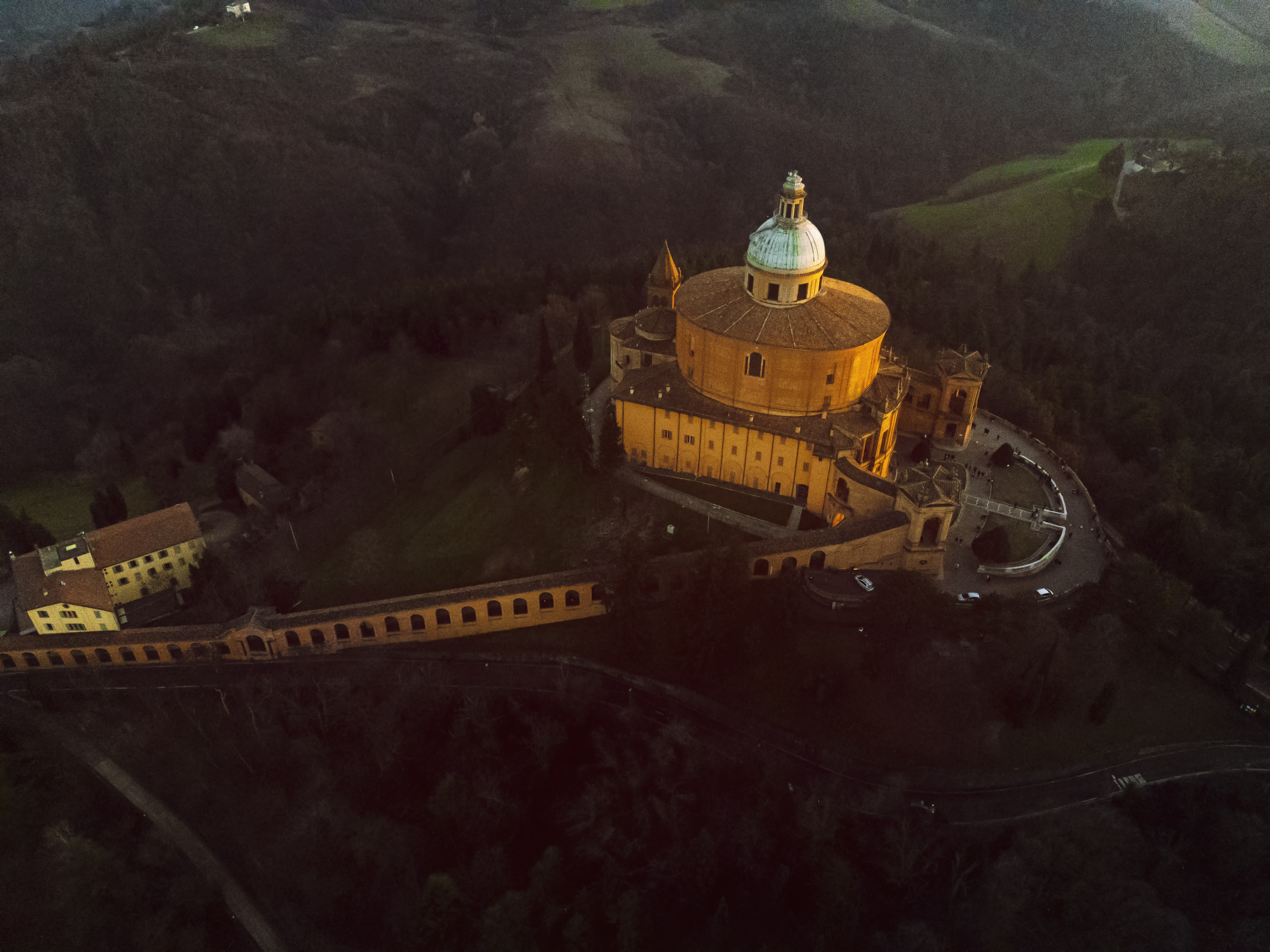
The Portico di San Luca winding through the hills toward the sanctuary

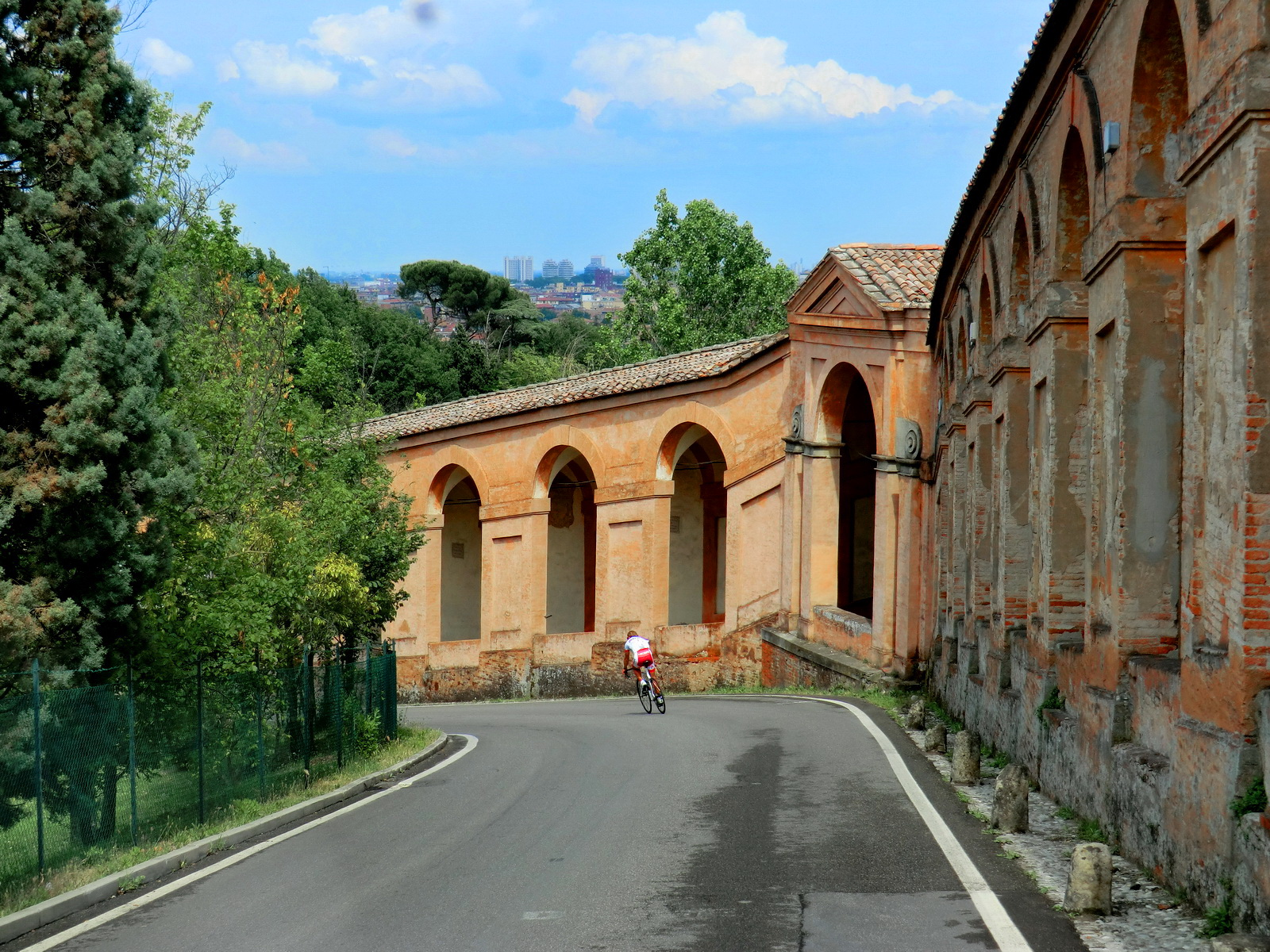
The Portico di San Luca

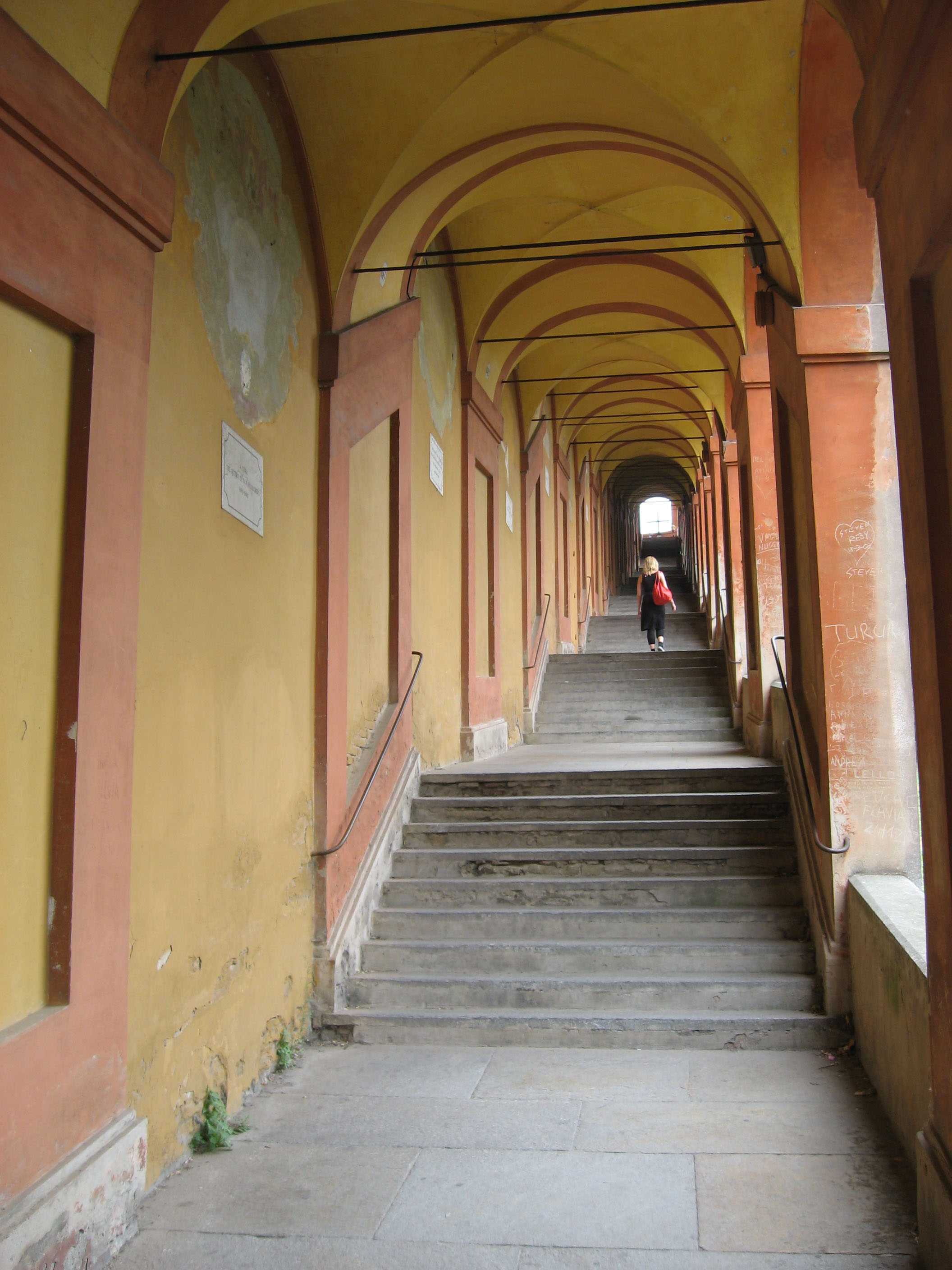
Stairway section of the Portico di San Luca in Bologna, featuring one of its 666 arches

== See also ==
- 18th-century Western domes
