= Palazzo Grassi, Bologna =

Coordinates: 44°29′50.6″N 11°20′43.00″E

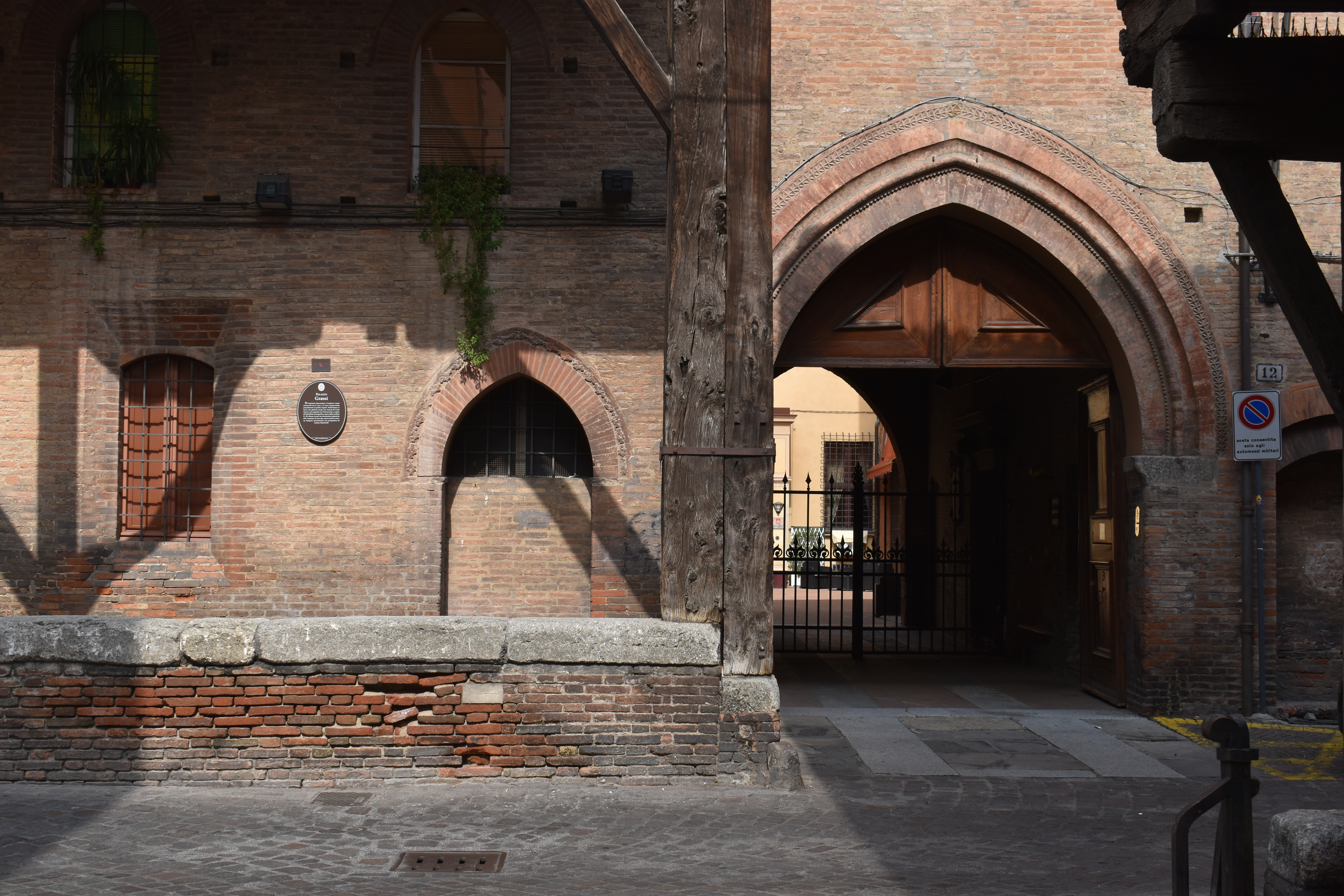
Portico Palazzo Grassi, detail, Bologna

The Palazzo Grassi is Gothic-style, 13th-century palace located on Via Marsala #14 in Bologna, region of Emilia Romagna, Italy. The palace in 2015 houses the Circolo Ufficiali dell'Esercito, a private Officer's club.

== History ==
The palace once belonged to the Canonici family, but was acquired by the Grassi family in 1466, and remained with their descendants until 1848. In 1478, the family was honored with the title of Conti Palatini del Sacro Romano Impero by Frederick III, Holy Roman Emperor. In 1865, the palace was acquired by the military. It underwent a number of renovations, with the latest in the 20th century, and in 1935 it became the home of the Circolo club.

The palace still retains a wooden portico columns for part of the facade. The portals have a peaked entrance. Inside the courtyard are intaglio works by Properzia de Rossi and a 16th-century terracotta depicting a Madonna with Child. The palace chapel, has stucco decoration by Giuseppe Maria Mazza and frescoed decoration (1704) is by Ercole Graziani.
