= Porta San Vitale, Bologna =

Porta San Vitale, sometimes known as Porta per Ravenna, was an eastern portal of the former outer medieval walls of the city of Bologna, Italy. It is located on a piazza of the same name, immediately west of the intersection of Via San Vitale with the Viale di Ciconvallazione.

== History ==
The portal was first erected in 1286 with an adjacent barracks and a tower. The tower was demolished in the early 16th century. Formerly the gate had a moat and ravelin on the exterior side. At the end of 18th century the drawbridge was demolished. Between 1950 and 1952, the exterior forepart and ravelin were removed.
