= State Archives of Bologna =

State archival institution in Bologna, Italy

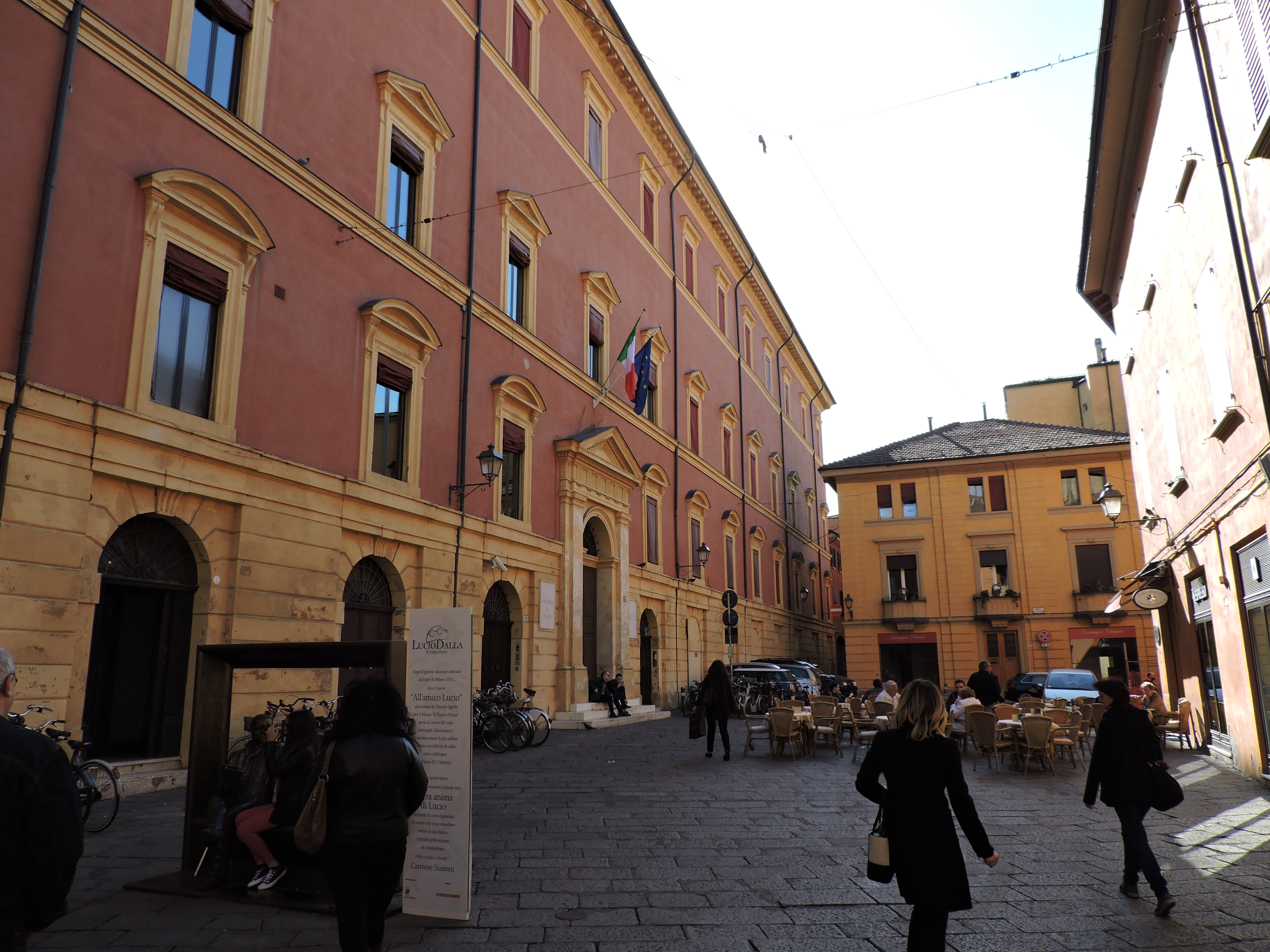
- Interactive map of State Archives of Bologna
- 44°29′32″N 11°20′29″E
- Location: Bologna, Emilia-Romagna, Italy
- Type: State archive
- Established: 1874
- Website: http://www.archiviodistatobologna.it/

The State Archives of Bologna (Italian: Archivio di Stato di Bologna) is a public archival institution located in Bologna, Emilia-Romagna, Italy. It preserves administrative and historical records relating to the metropolitan city as part of the national archival network administered by the Italian Ministry of Culture.

The archive was established in October 1874. It holds administrative documentation produced by the governing bodies of the city of Bologna up to 1796, as well as records created by the peripheral offices of the Papal States, the Kingdom of Italy, and the Italian Republic. It also includes a Section in Imola.

Since 1940, the institution has been housed in the former convent of the Celestine monks in Bologna. Before that date, the archive was located in Palazzo Galvani.

== Sources ==
- Zanni Rosiello, Isabella, ed. (1995). L'archivio di Stato di Bologna. Florence: Nardini.
- "Archivio di Stato di Bologna". Sistema archivistico nazionale (in Italian). Istituto centrale per gli archivi.
- "Archivio di Stato di Bologna". TourER – Portale del patrimonio culturale dell'Emilia-Romagna (in Italian). Segretariato regionale del Ministero della cultura per l'Emilia-Romagna.
