= Porta Maggiore, Bologna =

Coordinates: 44°29′24″N 11°21′26″E

Porta Maggiore, now known as Porta Mazzini, was the main eastern portal of the former medieval walls of the city of Bologna, Italy. It straddles the site in which the Strada Maggiore of Bologna changes name to via Mazzini, immediately west of the intersection with the Viale di Ciconvallazione.

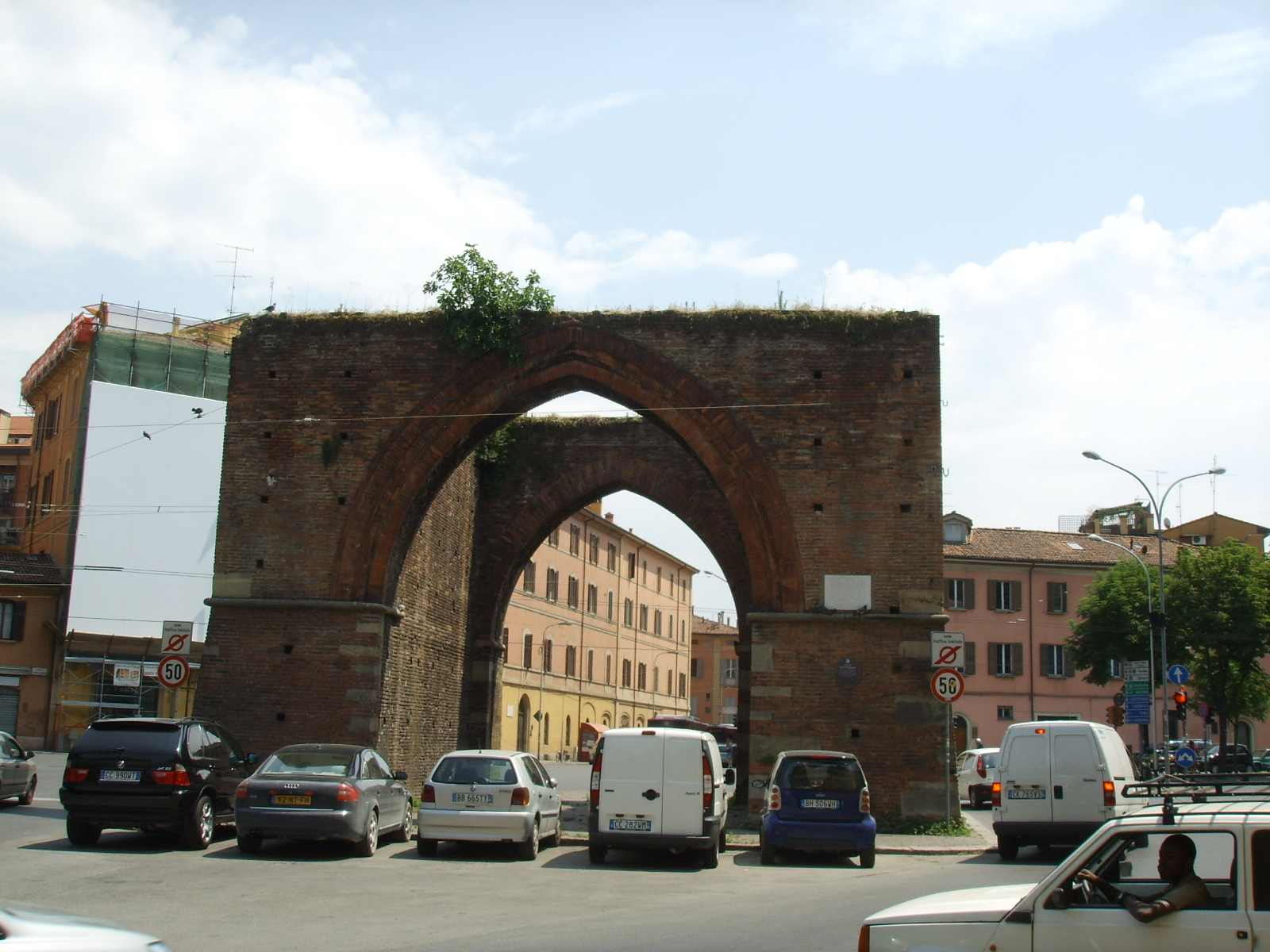
Porta Maggiore

First erected in the 13th century, in 1507, under Pope Julius II a further fortification was added. By the 17th century, porticos were built leading to the church-sanctuary of Santa Maria Lacrimosa degli Alemanni further down on Via Mazzini. In 1770, the portal was partially reconstructed by designs of Giovanni Giacomo Dotti. In 1903, the gate was nearly completely dismantled, but a fierce debate shut down the work, and soon led to conservation and restoration under the direction of Alfonso Rubbiani. Further restorations occurred in 2007 and 2009, but it remains a shell of the former self, an inconvenience in the road, standing as a roofless brick structure with two ogival arches in series, devoid of its former facade and covered passageway.
