= Pio =

Pio or PIO may refer to:

== Places ==
- Pio Lake, Italy
- Pio Island, Solomon Islands
- Pio Point, Bird Island, south Atlantic Ocean

== People ==
- Pio (given name)
- Pio (surname)
- Pio (footballer, born 1986), Brazilian footballer
- Pio (footballer, born 1988), Brazilian footballer

== PIO ==
- Programmed input–output, a method of computer data transmission
- Public information officer of a government department
- Person of Indian Origin, a person of Indian descent
- Pilot-induced oscillation, an undesirable phenomenon in aircraft control

== Other uses ==
- Pio, prefix of 2^{50} octets, a unit of information in computer science
- Pio (warehouse automation), a Norwegian company created by AutoStore

== See also ==
- Pi O or П. O., Greek-Australian poet born 1951
