= Pio (surname) =

Pio is a surname. Notable people with the surname include:

- Angelo Piò (1690–1770), Italian sculptor
- Antonio Pio (composer) (1753–1795), Italian composer
- Antonio Pio (painter) (1809–1871), Italian painter
- Domenico Piò (1715–1801), Italian sculptor, son of Angelo Piò
- Emmanuel Pío (born 1988), Argentine footballer
- Iørn Piø (1927–1998), Danish folklorist, historian and archivist
- Louis Pio (1841–1894), one of the founders of the organized worker's movement in Denmark and principal founder of the Danish Social Democratic Party
- Teodoro Pio (died 1561), Italian Roman Catholic bishop
