= Baroncelli =

Baroncelli may refer to:

== People with the surname ==
- Folco de Baroncelli-Javon (1869–1943), French author and cattle farmer.
- Jacques de Baroncelli (1881–1951), French film director.
- Jean de Baroncelli (1914-1998), French author.

== Locations ==
- Baroncelli Chapel, a chapel inside the Basilica of Santa Croce, Florence in Florence, Italy.

== Paintings ==
- Master of the Baroncelli Portraits
