= Santa Maria delle Muratelle, Bologna =

Church in Bologna, Italy

Coordinates: 44°29′25.18″N 11°20′14.49″E

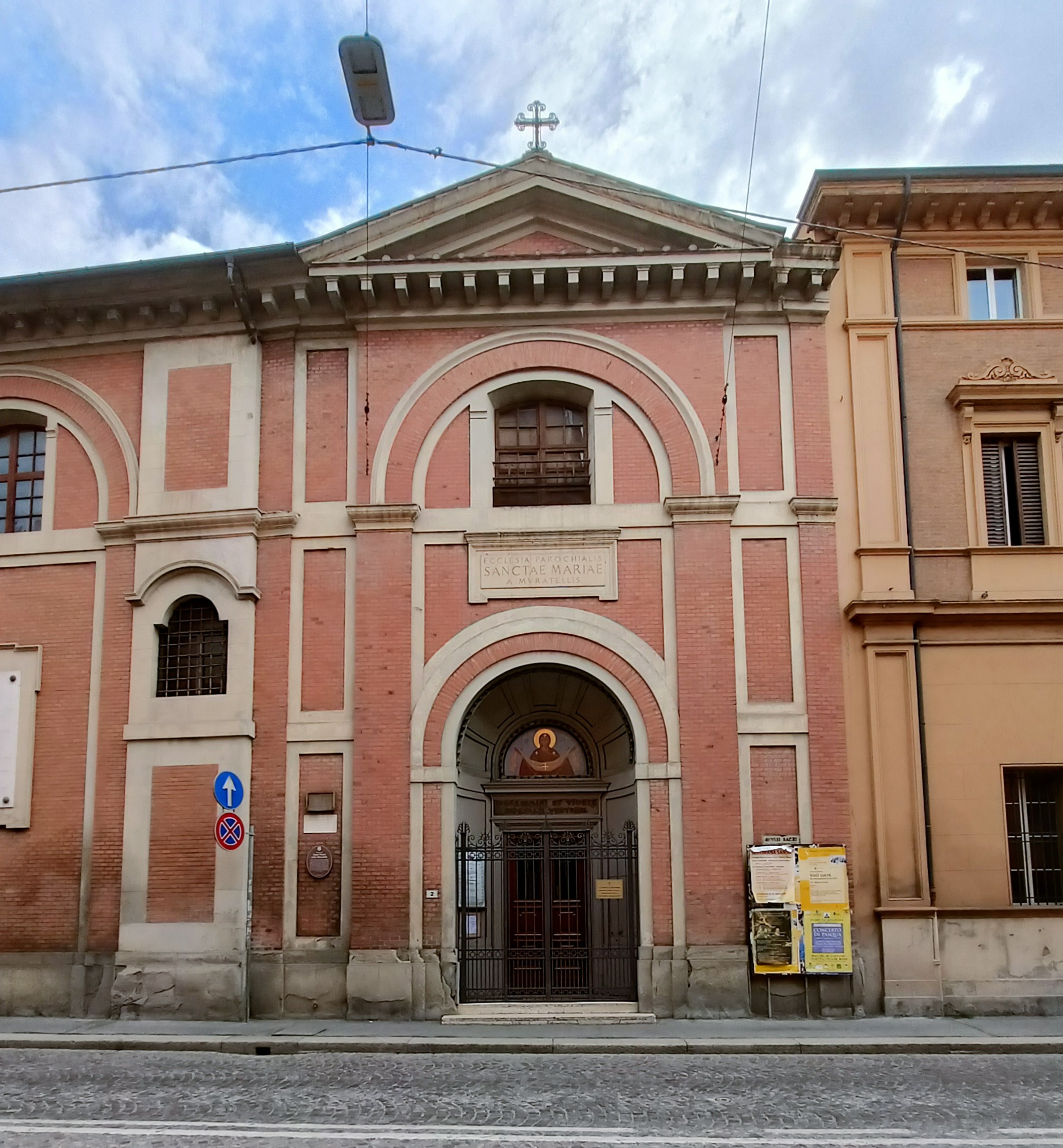
Church of the Muratelle, facade. Photo by Lorenzo Viscanti, 2023

Santa Maria delle Muratelle, or Santa Maria Annunziata delle Muratelle, is a 17th-century Roman Catholic church located on Via Saragozza #2 in Bologna, region of Emilia Romagna, Italy.

== History ==
A 13th-century church at the site was razed in 1630 to allow for the building of a new street for the expanding city, and in turn causing this new church to be built. Around the year 1735, the interior was refurbished by Carlo Francesco Dotti. The facade remained incomplete, and was only finished in 1928 by Edoardo Collamarini. The bell-tower dates to 1690. The church was deconsecrated in 1805 during the French occupation, and the parish moved to Santa Caterina di Saragozza. With restoration of papal authority, the church was remade into a parish church.

Inside the main altarpiece was painted in 1783 by Jacopo Alessandro Calvi. The altar sculpture (circa 1717) was completed Giuseppe Maria Mazza (1717 c.). There is also a painting by Giovanni Francesco Gessi.

The adjacent oratory was designed in 1772 by Raimondi Compagnini, with statues by Domenico Piò, paintings by Ubaldo Bovicini, and stucco-work by Pietro Martire Bagutti.

The first altar on right of the entrance once had a canvas by Tardini then one by Pezzi Ragazzoni. The church had a fresco of a Virgin and Child (prior to 1220) that had been painted on the wall of the earlier church.
