= Antonio Pio =

Antonio Pio may refer to:

- Antonio Pio (composer) (1753–1795), Italian composer
- Antonio Pio (painter) (1809–1871), Italian painter
