= Catherine of Bologna =

Italian writer, artist (1413–1463)

Saint Catherine of Bologna OSC
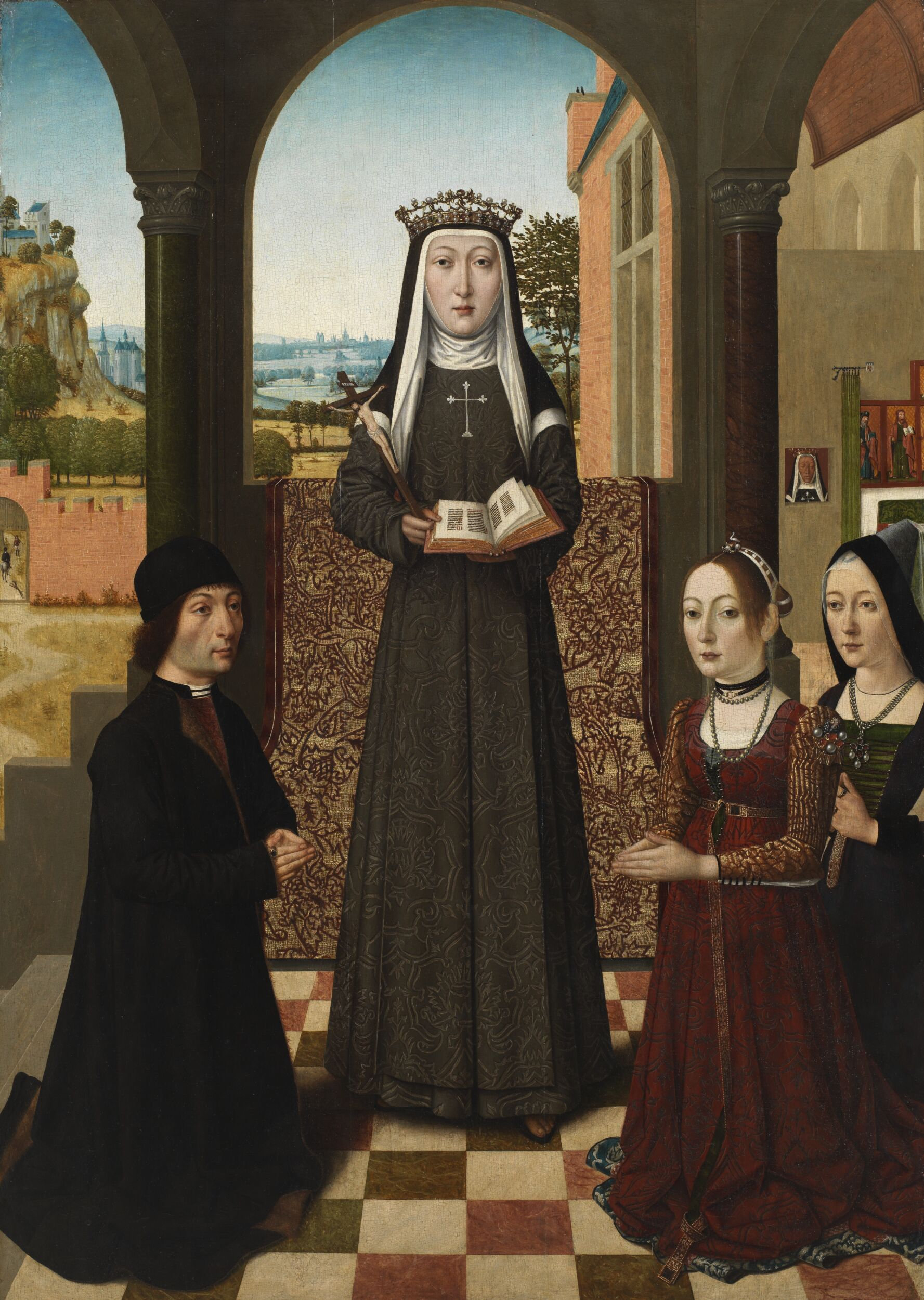
- Saint Catherine of Bologna with Three Donors by the Master of the Baroncelli Portraits, c. 1470–1480

Virgin
- Born: 8 September 1413; Bologna
- Died: 9 March 1463 (aged 49); Bologna
- Venerated in: Catholic Church
- Beatified: 1524, Old St. Peter's Basilica by Pope Clement VII
- Canonized: 22 May 1712, St. Peter's Basilica by Pope Clement XI
- Feast: 9 March
- Attributes: carrying the Infant Jesus

Catherine of Bologna (Bolognese: Caterina de' Vigri; 8 September 1413 – 9 March 1463) was an Italian Poor Clare, writer, teacher, mystic, artist, and saint. The patron saint of artists and against temptations, she was venerated for nearly three centuries in her native Bologna before being formally canonized in 1712 by Pope Clement XI. Her feast day is 9 March.

== Life ==
Catherine came from an upper-class family, the daughter of Benvenuta Mammolini of Bologna and Giovanni Vigri, a Ferrarese notary who worked for Niccolò III d'Este, Marquis of Ferrara. She was raised at Niccolo III's court as a lady-in-waiting to his wife Parisina Malatesta (d. 1425) and became lifelong friends with his natural daughter Margherita d'Este (d. 1478). During this time, she received some education in reading, writing, music, playing the viola, and had access to illuminated manuscripts in the d'Este Court library. The viola which she played is in the glass case and is thought to date from slightly earlier than her lifetime. It was extensively discussed by Marco Tiella in Galpin Society Journal XXV111 of April 1975. This information would be of interest to music scholars. A reconstruction has also been made.

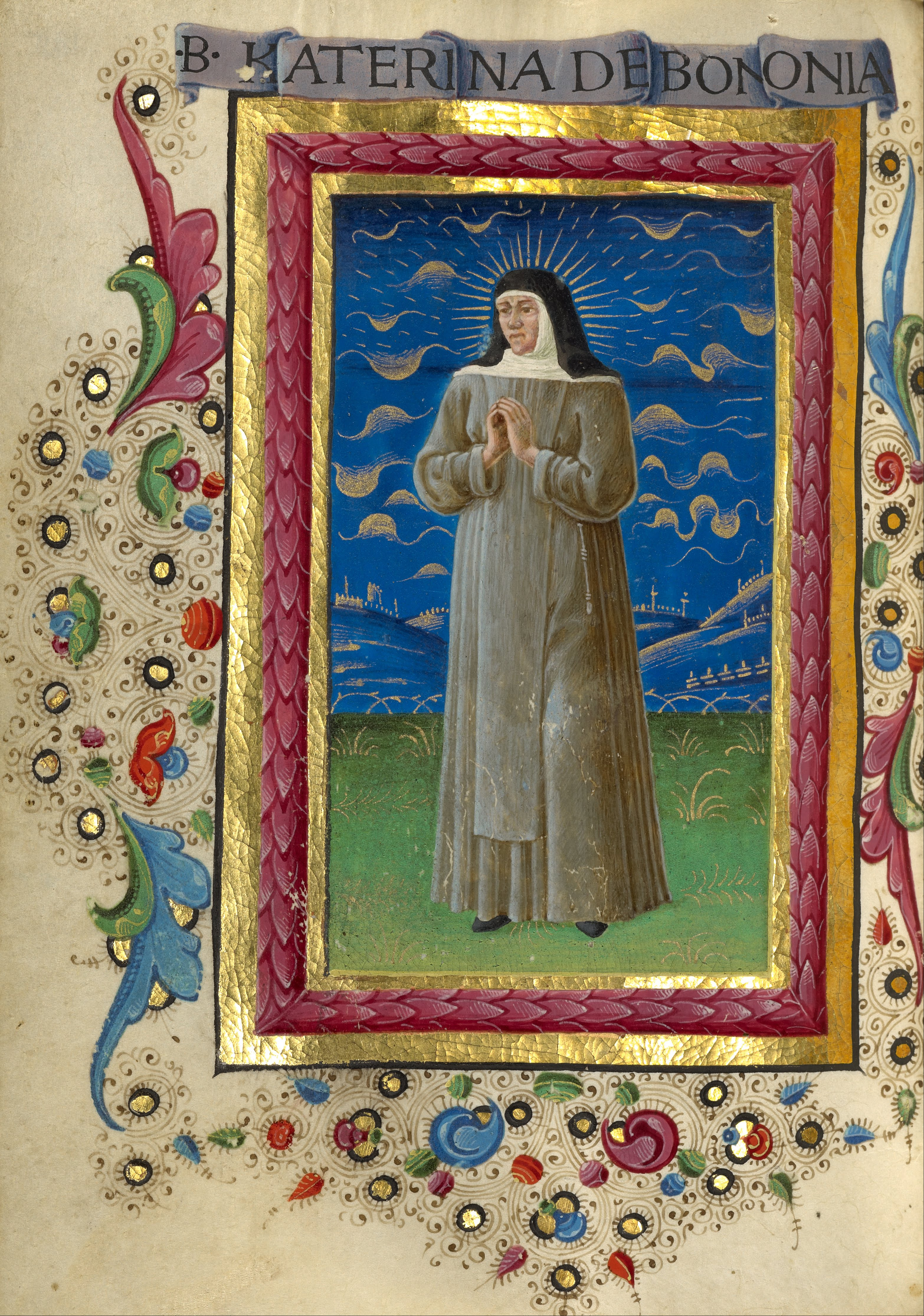
Guglielmo Giraldi (Italian, active 1445–1489) – Saint Catherine of Bologna

In 1426, after Niccolo III's execution of Parisina d'Este for infidelity, Catherine left court and joined a lay community of beguines living a semi-religious life and following the Augustinian rule. The women were divided over whether instead to adhere to the Franciscan rule, which eventually happened. In 1431 the beguine house was converted into the Observant Poor Clare convent of Corpus Domini, which grew from 12 women in 1431 to 144 women by the end of the century. Catherine lived at Corpus Domini, Ferrara most of her life from 1431 to 1456, serving as Mistress of Novices. She was a model of piety and reported experiencing miracles and several visions of Christ, the Virgin Mary, Thomas Becket, and Joseph, as well as future events, such as the fall of Constantinople in 1453. She wrote a number of religious treatises, lauds, sermons, and copied and illustrated her own breviary (see below).

In 1455, the Franciscans and the governors of Bologna requested that she become abbess of a new convent, which was to be established under the name of Corpus Domini in Bologna. She left Ferrara in July 1456 with 12 sisters to start the new community and remained abbess there until her death on 9 March 1463. Catherine was buried in the convent graveyard, but after eighteen days, a sweet smell emanated from the grave and the incorrupt body was exhumed. It was eventually relocated to a chapel where it remains on display, dressed in her religious habit, seated upright behind glass. A contemporary Poor Clare, Sister Illuminata Bembo, wrote her biography in 1469. A strong local Bolognese cult of Caterina Vigri developed and she became a Beata in the 1520s but was not canonized until 1712.

== Literary works ==
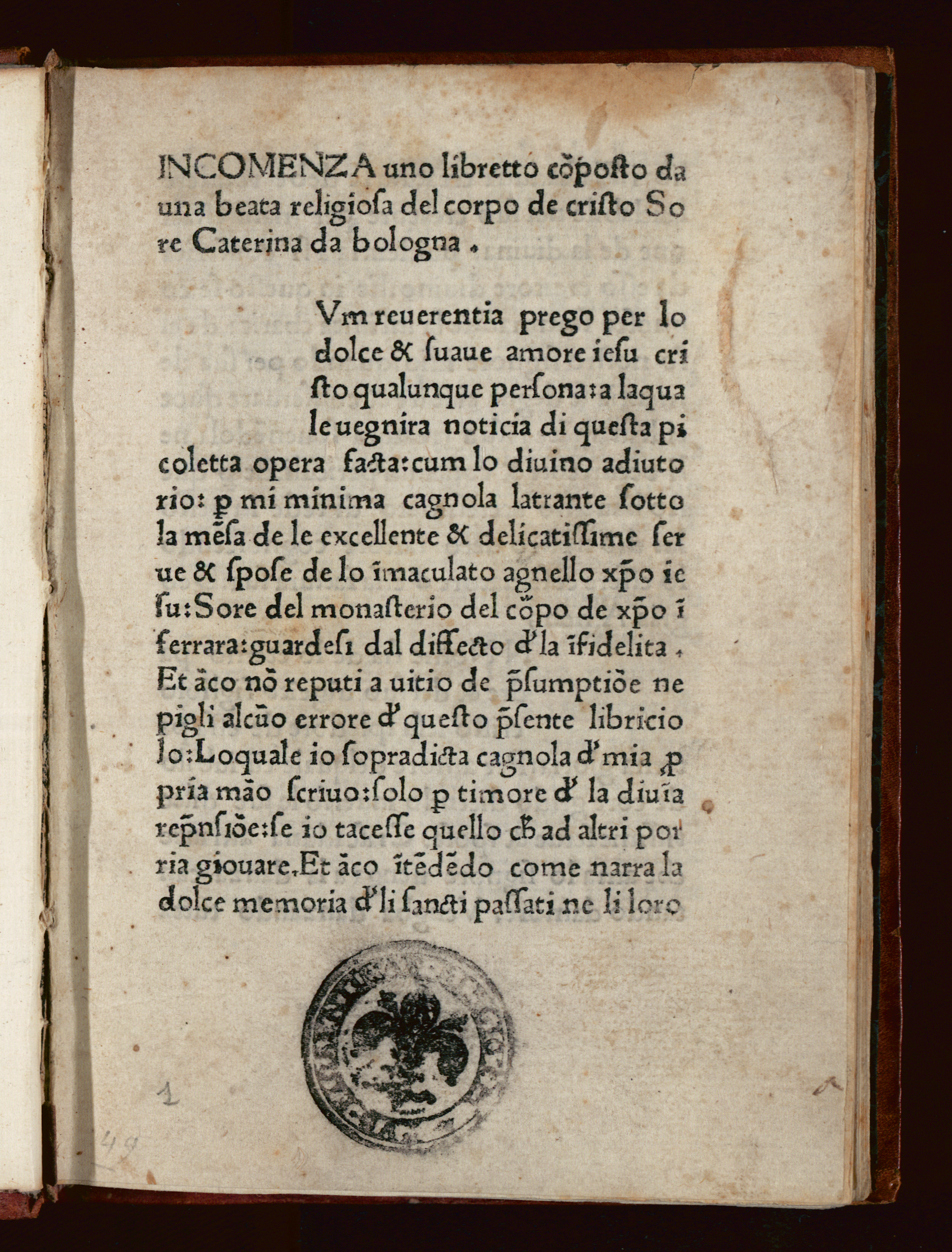
Sette armi spirituali, 1475

Catherine's best-known text is Seven Spiritual Weapons Necessary for Spiritual Warfare which she appears to have first written in 1438 and then rewritten and augmented between 1450 and 1456. Although she probably taught similar ideas, she kept the written version hidden until she neared death and then handed it to her confessor with instructions to send a copy to the Poor Clares at Ferrara. Part of this book describes at length her visions both of God and of Satan. The treatise was circulated in manuscript form through a network of Poor Clare convents. The Sette Armi Spirituali became an important part of the campaign for her canonization. It was first printed in 1475 and went through 21 later editions in the sixteenth and seventeenth centuries, including being translated into Latin, French, Portuguese, English, Spanish, and German. It, therefore, played an important role in the dissemination of late medieval vernacular mysticism in the early modern period. In addition, she wrote lauds, short religious treatises, and letters, as well as a 5000-line Latin poem called the Rosarium Metricum, the I Dodici Giardini and I Sermoni. These were discovered around 2000 and described by Cardinal Giacomo Biffi: as "now revealed in their surprising beauty. We can ascertain that she was not undeserving of her renown as a highly cultivated person. We are now in a position to meditate on a veritable monument of theology which, after the Treatise on the Seven Spiritual Weapons, is made up of distinct and autonomous parts: The Twelve Gardens, a mystical work of her youth, Rosarium, a Latin poem on the life of Jesus, and The Sermons, copies of Catherine's words to her religious sisters." Saint Catherine of Bologna had good education in drawing, writing, reading and language.

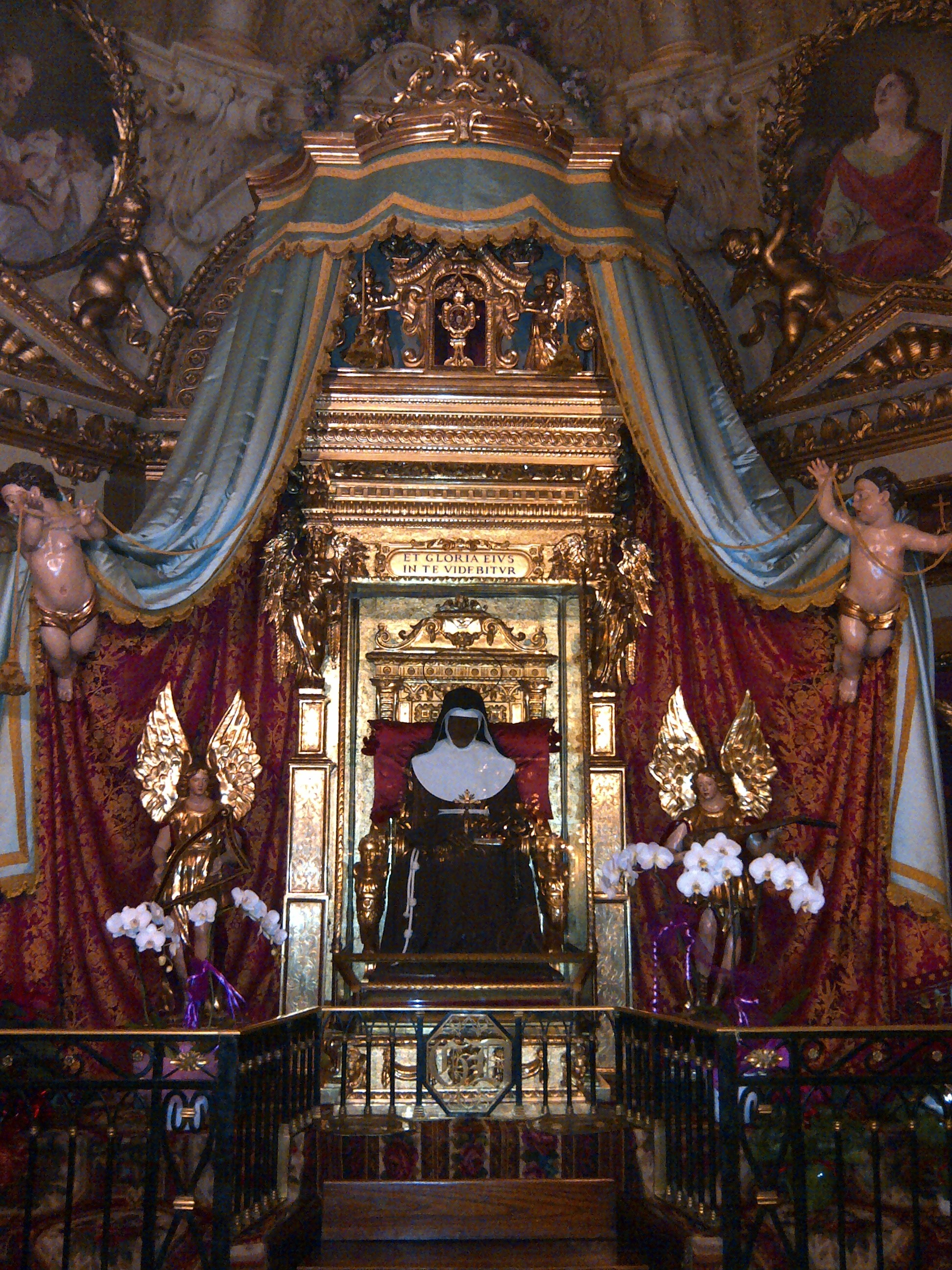
Body of Catherine in the Church of Corpus Domini, Bologna

== Artistic works ==
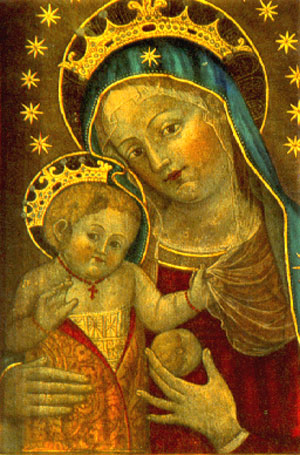
Madonna of the Apple, by St. Catherine of Bologna

Catherine represents the rare phenomenon of a 15th-century nun–an artist whose artworks are preserved in her personal breviary. She meditated while she copied the scriptural text, adding about 1000 prayer rubrics, and drew initials with bust-portraits of saints, paying special attention to images of Clare and Francis. Besides multiple images of Christ and the infant swaddled Christ Child, she depicted other saints, including Thomas Becket, Jerome, Paul, Anthony of Padua, Mary Magdalene, and Catherine of Alexandria. Her self-taught style incorporated motifs from needlework and devotional prints. Some saints' images, interwoven with text and rubrics, display an idiosyncratic, inventive iconography also found in German nuns' artworks (Nonnenarbeiten). The breviary and its images surely served a didactic function within the convent community. Other panel paintings and manuscripts attributed to her include the Madonna and Child (nicknamed the Madonna del Pomo, Madonna of the Apple) in the Cappella Della Santa, a possible portrait or self-portrait in the autograph copy of the Sette Armi Spirituali, a Redeemer, and another Madonna and Child in her chapel. Recently one scholar has tried to question certain attributions.

A drawing of a Man of Sorrows or Resurrected Christ found in a miscellany of lauds (Ms. 35 no.4, Archivio Generale Arcivescovile, Bologna) has also been attributed to her. Catherine is significant as a woman artist who articulated an aesthetic philosophy. She explained that although it took precious time, the purpose of her religious art was "to increase devotion for herself and others".

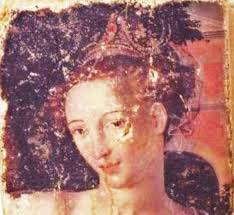
St. Catherine of Bologna, St. Ursula and her Maidens (detail) (1456)

Another large painting attributed to St. Catherine is one depicting St. Ursula and companions. Catherine seems to have had a devotion to this saint as she painted two images of her.
