= Angelo Piò =

Italian sculptor

- Saint Michael slaying the devil, Sant'Agostino, Imola
- Born: Angelo Gabriello Piò; 2 April 1690; Bologna, Papal States
- Died: 31 October 1769 (aged 79); Bologna, Papal States
- Education: Andrea Ferreri; Giuseppe Maria Mazza
- Occupation: Sculptor
- Movement: Rococo
- Children: Domenico Piò

Angelo Gabriello Piò (2 April 1690 – 31 October 1769) was an Italian Rococo sculptor, active in Bologna during the 18th century. A versatile and prolific artist, Piò specialized in free-standing statues, expressive sculptural groups, and intricate decorative bas-reliefs, intended primarily for churches, sanctuaries, and noble palaces in Bologna. He collaborated with some of the prime Bolognese architects of the time: Carlo Francesco Dotti, Alfonso Torreggiani and Giuseppe Antonio Ambrosi.

== Life ==
Angelo Piò was born in Bologna on 2 April 1690 to Domenico Piò and Caterina Palmieri. His father died when he was a young child. Piò was at first sent to a school for surgeons, but Giuseppe Creti, father of the Bolognese painter Donato Creti, urged him to follow his natural inclination for art and study drawing and sculpture. Piò entered the studio of Andrea Ferreri, a follower of Giuseppe Maria Mazza, who dominated Bolognese sculpture at the time. Piò remained with Ferreri until about 1712, then went to the studio of Mazza, who recognized potential in some of the terracotta reliefs realized by Piò for the Oratorio del Suffragio in San Giovanni in Persiceto, Bologna (c. 1711–12).

In 1718, by which time he had married, Piò travelled to Rome bearing numerous letters of recommendation; these enabled him to train with Camillo Rusconi. After a year he returned to Bologna and in 1721 was admitted to the Accademia Clementina under Mazza’s sponsorship. He became a versatile and prolific sculptor who explored the possibilities of marble, terracotta, stucco, papier-mâché, gold, silver and wax. He created many religious figural sculptures, but also mythological and allegorical subjects, small genre groups (c. 390 mm high) and sacred objects.

Much of Piò’s renown came from his funerary monuments. In one of his most famous, to the general and scholar Luigi Ferdinando Marsili (1733; San Domenico, Bologna), he sculpted a work well-suited to commemorate the learned man who had helped found and support the Accademia Clementina. Against a background of animated drapery, allegorical figures of Fame and Time display an oval portrait of Marsili and an inscription to his memory. The memorial’s style represented the Bolognese Late Baroque as exemplified by Mazza, with an emphasis on graceful restraint rather than dramatic action.

Most of Piò’s works were after this manner, although some of his sculptures, particularly those of secular subjects, demonstrated a neo-Mannerist style. Thus the stucco figures of Prudence, Strength and Wisdom (c. 1745; Bologna, Palazzo Cattani) exhibit elegant, serpentine poses rather far removed in conception from his other work.

One of the statues decorating the monumental staircase of Palazzo Varrini, Bologna

In 1743, Francesco Antonio Varrini purchased the palace originally owned by the Bargellini family and commissioned radical Rococo renovations. The grand, monumental staircase of the palace was designed by the Bolognese architect Giuseppe Antonio Ambrosi. Piò realized the sculptural decorations of the staircase including a colossal stucco statue of Mary Immaculate, situated within a dedicated niche.

From 1746 onwards, Piò created over twenty full-length plaster statues for the Sanctuary of San Luca. In this work he collaborated with the plasterers Antonio Calegari and Giuseppe Borelli, who made the scrolls with Biblical sayings, and with Gaetano Lollini, who created the statues in the second chapel on the right.

Piò’s colossal stucco statues of Isaiah and Jeremiah, realized around 1755 for the Church of Corpus Domini, are firmly in the Late Baroque tradition; both works suffered extensive damage in World War II and subsequently underwent restoration, yet they reveal Piò’s command of the medium in the broad sweep of draperies that amplifies the magnitude of each prophet’s presence.

Around 1759 Piò executed a polychrome wax commemorative bust of the architect Carlo Francesco Dotti (Madonna di San Luca, Bologna), with whom he had frequently collaborated. His realistic treatment in this instance extended even to affixing real hair, glass eyes and clothes to the figure. Piò also found time to create, sometimes with his son, pupil and assistant Domenico Piò, numerous wooden ‘sepulchres’ with coloured papier-mâché religious characters for use in Bologna Cathedral, during Holy Week. These ephemeral works are known primarily through contemporary prints.

Piò seems to have resisted the Neoclassical currents present in Bologna by about 1765, persisting, with his student Filippo Scandellari (brother of Pietro), in the tradition of Mazza and Rusconi, although the Rococo grace and charm of his forms suggest he was not wholly insensitive to external stylistic developments. Piò died in Bologna on 31 October 1769, aged 79. Besides his son Domenico and Filippo Scandellari, his pupils included Antonio Schiassi, Gaetano Pignoni and Carlo Sarti.

== Gallery ==
Monument to Luigi Ferdinando Marsili, San Domenico, Bologna

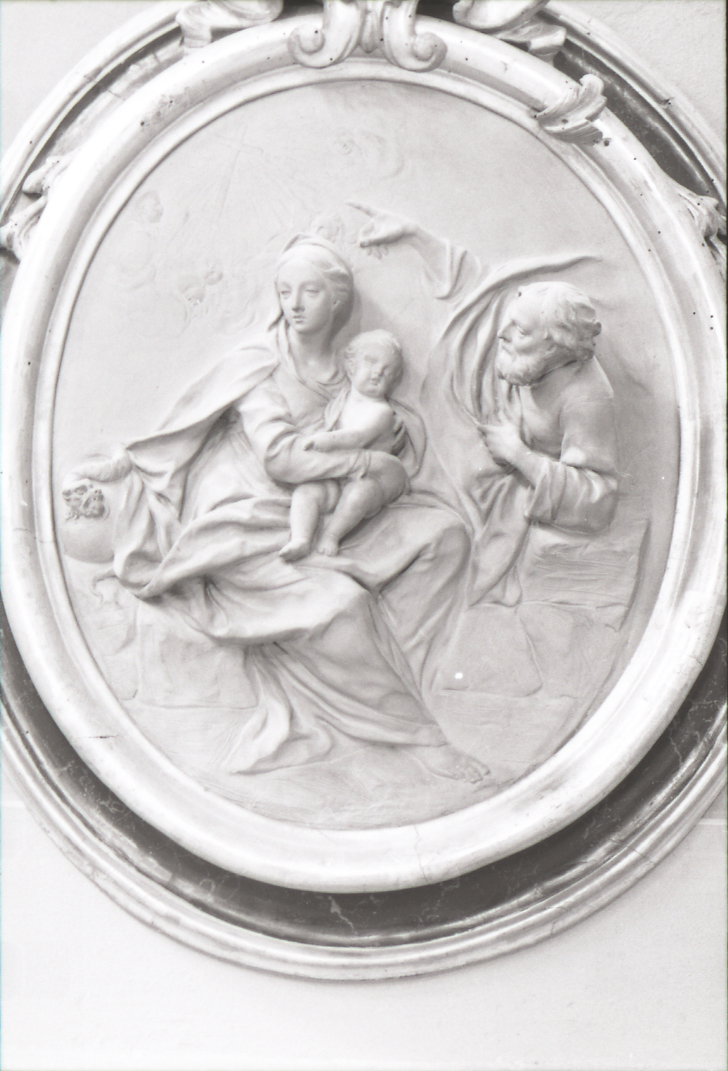
Madonna and Child. Relief in the Collegiata of San Giovanni in Persiceto

Angel. Sculpture in the Sanctuary of San Luca

God the Father. Sculpture in the Sanctuary of San Luca

The colossal stucco statue of Isaiah in Corpus Domini, Bologna, before it was damaged during World War II

Annunciation, Bode Museum, Berlin

Fortitude, terracotta statuette, Metropolitan Museum of Art, New York
