= Palazzo Marescotti Brazzetti, Bologna =

The Palazzo Marescotti Brazzetti is a Baroque style palace located on Via Barberia 4 in central Bologna, Italy. It is owned by the University of Bologna, and part of the Department of Music and Performance arts (di Musica e Spettacolo).

The palace construction began in 1508 and was designed by Giovanni Beroaldo atop earlier buildings. But the interiors of the palace we see today were mainly the commission of the last Marescotti of senatorial rank, Raniero (1640-1690). He also commissioned the scenic entry staircases designed by Giovanni Giacomo Monti. The palace has had many owners over the centuries, including the Italian Communist Party, who bought the palace in 1947. Restoration of the palace was completed by the university by December 2007.

The main floor has frescoes completed by Domenico Maria Canuti with stucco work (1682) by Giovanni Francesco Bezzi; Marcantonio Franceschini and Enrico Haffner (1682); and by the brothers Giovanni and Antonio Rolli (1683) including the grand salon, which they worked in during 1687 but completed (1709) by Giuseppe Antonio Caccioli.
