= Enrico Haffner =

Italian painter (1640–1702)

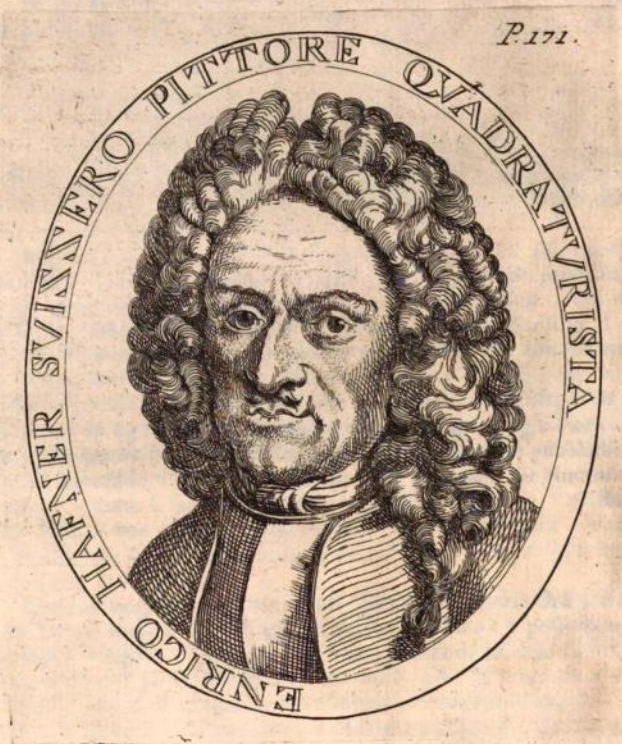
- Born: August 1640; Bologna, Papal States
- Died: 1702 (aged 61–62); Bologna
- Education: Domenico Maria Canuti
- Known for: Painting
- Notable work: Quadratura paintings in various churches and palaces in Bologna
- Movement: Baroque

Enrico Haffner (August 1640 – 1702) was an Italian painter of quadratura during the Baroque period, active mainly in Bologna.

== Biography ==
Enrico was born to a Swiss father, who was a mercenary Swiss guard for the Papacy, stationed in Bologna; Enrico himself rose to become a lieutenant in the force. His younger brother Antonio Maria Haffner (born 1654) also became a painter.

While it is sometimes said the Haffner brothers trained with Domenico Maria Canuti, they practiced painting quadratura, and seem to have learned more from Baldassare Bianchi and Giovanni Giacomo Monti, as well as the influence of Agostino Mitelli. Enrico did travel with Canuti to Rome and painted in the church of Santi Domenico e Sisto. Returning to Bologna, under the patronage of the Olivetan prior Taddeo Pepoli, Haffner also worked alongside Canuti at the convent of San Michele in Bosco, including quadratura above the main altar of the church.

Enrico also worked with Marcantonio Franceschini in the church of Corpus Domini and in the Palazzo Marescotti. In November 1661, he worked for the duke of Modena for one year, where he was paid a stipend of 130 lire per month. Again in 1696, he worked with Franceschini and Luigi Quaini in completing frescoes for the main hall of the Ducal Palace of Modena. Haffner worked with Giovanni Antonio Burrini in Santi Giovanni Battista dei Celestini. Enrico worked with Giovanni Gioseffo dal Sole in the Palazzo Bianconcini.

Enrico also painted in Savona in the church of Spirito Santo, in the palazzo Gavoti, and in the Balbi Chapel.
