= Andrea Ferreri =

Italian sculptor

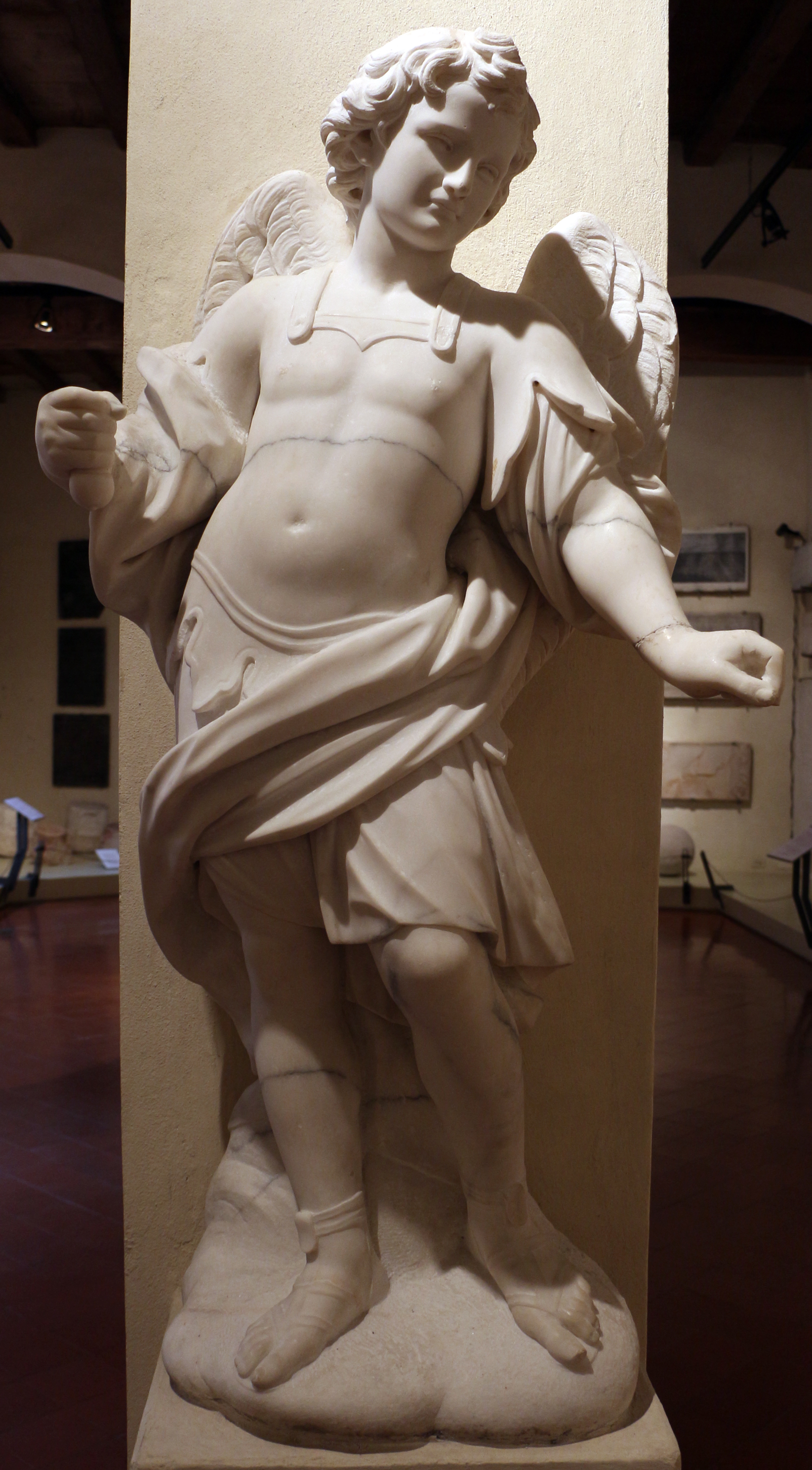
Andrea ferreri, san michele arcangelo, 1720-35 ca., da s. andrea a ferrara

Andrea Ferreri (13 February 1673 – 13 June 1744) was an Italian sculptor of the late Baroque. He was born in Milan, by 1683, he was found in Bologna, training with Giuseppe Maria Mazza. In 1722, he moved to Ferrara, where he soon became director of the Academy of Fine Arts. Much of his sculpture work was in stucco.
