= Lucrezia Scarfaglia =

Italian artist

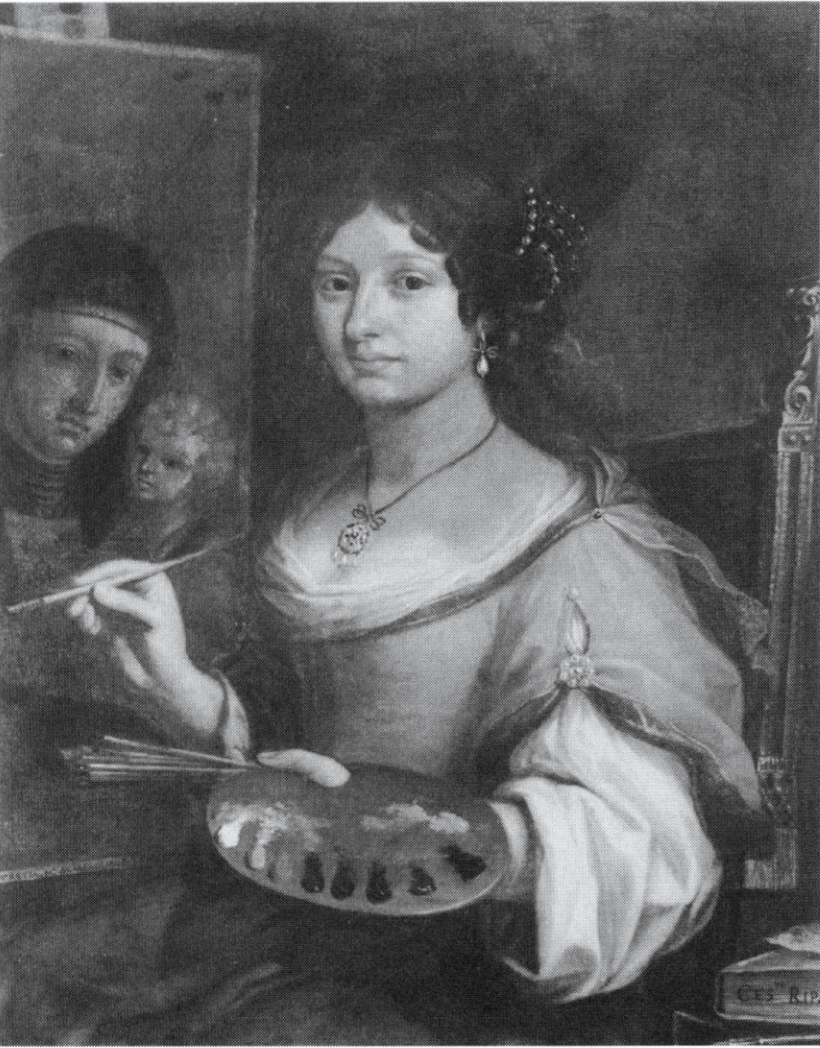
Self-Portrait by Lucrezia Scarfaglia, in the collection of the Galleria Pallavicini

Lucrezia Scarfaglia (active 1677–1678) was a Bolognese painter of the 17th century. Almost nothing is known of her life and career save that she was a pupil of Elisabetta Sirani, after whose death she took lessons with Domenico Maria Canuti. She was described by Carlo Cesare Malvasia as "not a mediocre painter". In his Felsina pittrice, Malvasia lists a number of works by Scarfaglia's hand, including a handful of religious works and a portrait of Eleanora Gonzaga. Surviving is a self-portrait, signed and dated 1678, in which she depicts herself painting the Madonna of Saint Luke. This piece is in an archaic style reminiscent of sixteenth-century paintings; it is currently held by the Galleria Pallavicini in Rome.
