= Antonio Maria Haffner =

Italian painter

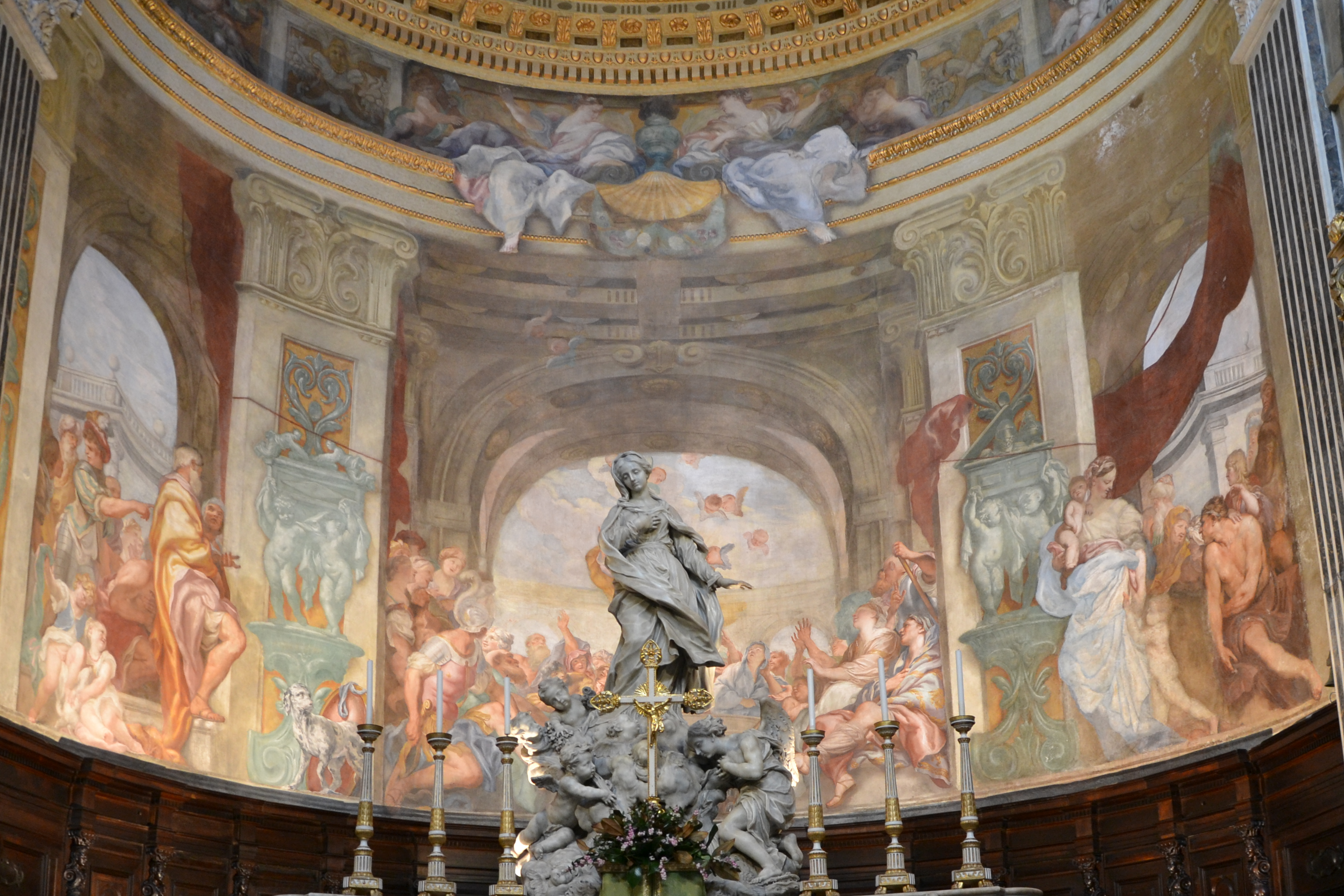
Genoa, San Luca, Immaculate by Filippo Parodi; frescoes by Domenico Piola, 1695; and quadrature by Anton Maria Haffner

Antonio Maria Haffner (1654–1732) was an Italian painter of quadratura and priest during the Baroque period, active mainly in Bologna.

== Biography ==
Haffner was born to a Swiss father, who was a mercenary Pontifical Swiss Guard, stationed in Bologna; Antonio Maria himself rose to become a lieutenant in the force. Along with his older brother Enrico Haffner (born 1640), they initially trained in the studio of Domenico Maria Canuti, but soon gravitated to quadratura,

Antonio traveled to Rome with his brother and Canuti. After returning to Bologna, he traveled in 1676 to Genoa. He lived there for the rest of his life, entering the Congregation of the Oratory of St Phillip Neri. The order was supportive of his work as a painter.
