= Domenico Maria Canuti =

Italian painter (1625–1684)

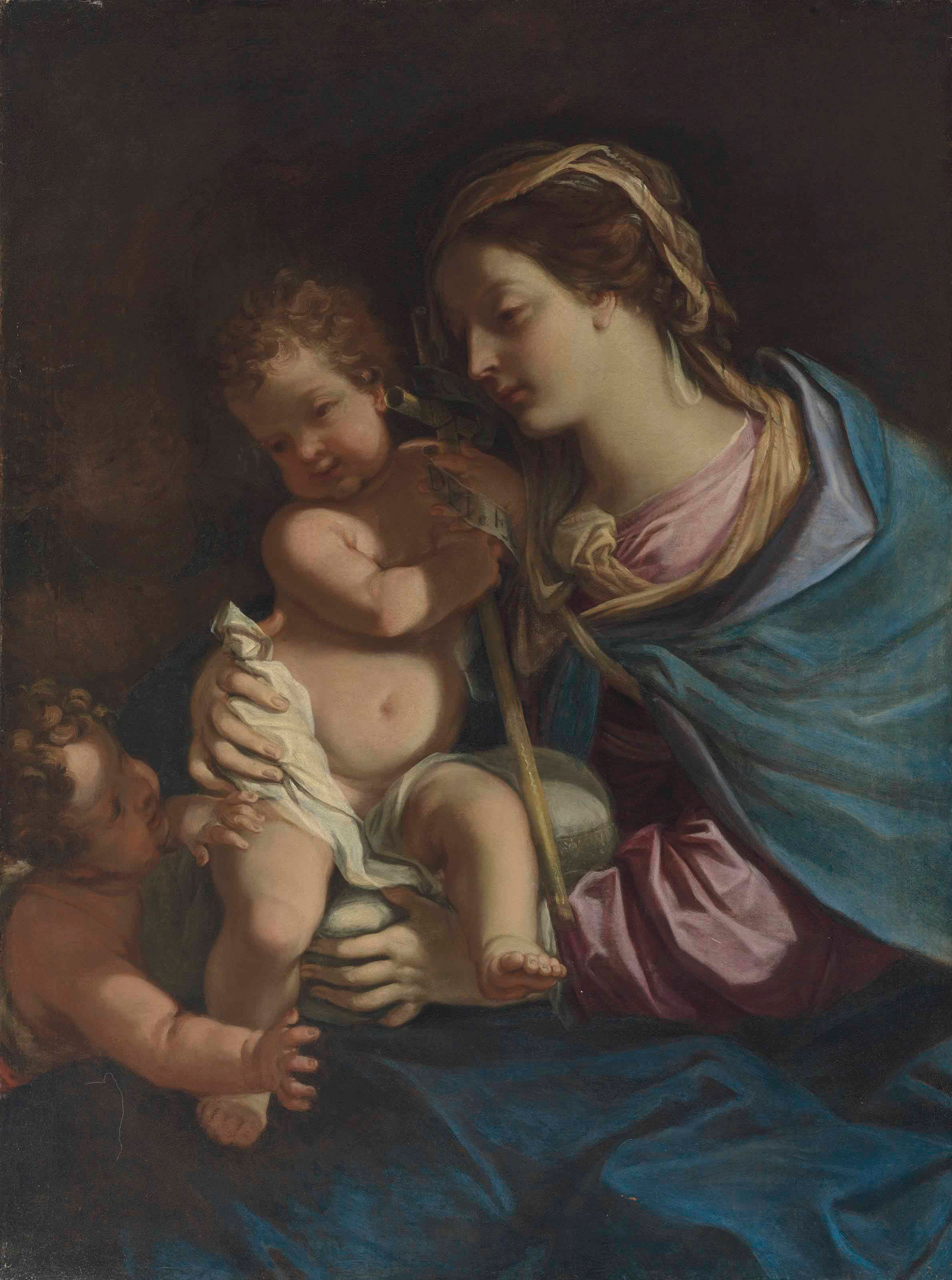
- Virgin and Child with the Infant Saint John the Baptist
- Born: 5 April 1625; Bologna, Papal States
- Died: 6 April 1684 (aged 59); Bologna, Papal States
- Education: Guido Reni; Guercino
- Known for: Painting; Engraving
- Movement: Baroque

Domenico Maria Canuti (5 April 1625 – 6 April 1684) was an Italian painter and engraver of the Baroque period, active mainly in Bologna and Rome. He was a major painter of fresco decorations. His ceiling decorations showed a mix of Bolognese and Roman influences.

== Life ==
Born in Bologna, Canuti first trained in that city under Guido Reni, then with Guercino. Early in his career, Canuti executed various decorative works for the Palazzo Pepoli Campogrande, Bologna. By March 1665 he had finished his first commission there: two frescoes on the grand staircase ceiling, set within medallion-shaped stucco frames and showing the outstanding events of the life of the distinguished 14th-century Bolognese figure Taddeo Pepoli – his Election as Prince of Bologna in 1338 and Appointment to the Apostolic Vicarage by Pope Benedict XII. Here the architectural settings reveal a specific debt to Veronese. Three preparatory studies for the work survive; a drawing (London, British Museum) for the first, and bozzetti for both (Milan, Treccani priv. col.). These demonstrate Canuti’s usual habit of diverging, in the completed work, from all preparatory sketches.

Between 1660 and 1670 , in collaboration with an ex-pupil, the quadraturista Giovan Gioseffo Santi (1644–1719), Canuti painted his outstandingly successful Apotheosis of Hercules on Olympus on the ceiling of the Gran Salone in the Palazzo Pepoli Campogrande. This work, which alludes by association to the glorious distinction of the Pepoli, achieves a compelling illusion of vast aerial space through a careful balancing of light and mass. It also achieves a perfect balance between figure painting and quadratura. For Canuti its precedents would have been the celebrated ceiling decorations in Rome: Annibale Carracci’s for the Farnese Gallery and Pietro da Cortona’s for the Palazzo Barberini. He was probably also familiar with Cortona’s ceilings for the State rooms of the Palazzo Pitti in Florence (for illustration of ceiling in Sala di Giove). Santi’s preparatory sketch for the quadratura setting (Windsor Castle, Berkshire, Royal Collection) shows the influence of the designs made by Angelo Mitelli Colonna and Agostino Mitelli for the Palazzo Pitti. The final plan, however, abandoned the rectangular format of the sketch in favour of an oval and an even more daring perspective. It is clear from the Palazzo Pepoli quadratura, among the most intricate of its time, that Canuti was attracted less by the dominantly architectural scheme of Colonna and Mitelli than by the ornamental and decorative possibilities of the form. His gift for using such effects to enhance the figure painting enabled him to impart a new vigour and sense of opulence to an established Roman Baroque genre. Several preparatory sketches for the ceiling survive: three oval drawings for the central scene (Staatliche Graphische Sammlung München; Venice, Cini Foundation; London, Flavia Ormond Fine Arts) and two bozzetti (both priv. col.).

Death of St. Benedict, c. 1671, Bologna, Pinacoteca Nazionale

The project was completed in August 1671 and its success brought Canuti immediate invitations to work in Rome. Before he went to Rome, however, he painted a somewhat different work, the Death of St. Benedict (c. 1671; Pinacoteca Nazionale di Bologna), which, in its spirit and strong, dark tonality, anticipates the early work of Giuseppe Crespi. In Rome by 4 April 1672, Canuti was enrolled as a member of the Accademia di San Luca in September. His most important Roman commission was for the Apotheosis of St. Dominic, painted (1673–5) on the vault and apse of Santi Domenico e Sisto, with Enrico Haffner as quadraturista. It was also Canuti’s only commission for a nave vault. Haffner conceived his framework as the continuation of the actual architecture of the walls of the church. Frescoed corbels appear below frescoed windows (matching the real ones) and appear to support frescoed balconies and bridges, features that both define and contain the limitless space of the ceiling. Canuti’s careful grouping of the figures and his adept handling of perspective and light effects give a strong sense of upwardly swirling movement to the dramatic central scene of the Apotheosis. The quadratura is lavish to a degree not previously encountered in Rome. However, this new type of scenographic fresco painting attracted few followers in that city, apart from Andrea Pozzo in his painting (1688–94) of the vault of Sant'Ignazio. The style had more success in Genoa, where Canuti’s love of a sensual profusion of flowers, fruit and half-naked figures appealed to native taste, and flourished in the decorative ensembles of Gregorio De Ferrari and the quadraturista Antonio Maria Haffner.

In Rome Canuti was employed with Francesco Cozza and Carlo Maratta in the decoration of Palazzo Altieri. Together with Enrico Haffner, he frescoed the Apotheosis of Romulus (1675–6) on the large antechamber ceiling of the Palazzo. The vitality of this work, another triumph of illusionistic space, is also found in a surviving preparatory drawing (Madrid, Museo del Prado). According to some scholars, Canuti also contributed to the decorations of Palazzo Colonna, alongside other major 17th-century artists like Filippo Gherardi, Giovanni Coli, and Carlo Maratta.

In 1676, Canuti returned to Bologna, where between 21 June 1677 and 24 January 1678 he provided decorations for the library of the convent of San Michele in Bosco for Abbot Taddeo Pepoli. In the central salon the theme of knowledge covers the three domes and is continued on the wall lunettes with allegories of the sciences (preparatory drawing, Florence, Uffizi). The style anticipates the Rococo decoration of 18th-century libraries. Neither this commission nor the Jupiter Delivering Bacchus to Mercury that Canuti frescoed on a ceiling in Palazzo Marescotti Brazzetti, Bologna, display his previously characteristic preoccupation with ceiling depth and irradiating light. The Marescotti fresco, for which preparatory drawings exist (Paris, Louvre; Budapest, National Museum), is Canuti’s only known ceiling without quadratura.

Apart from his obviously significant contribution to Italian ceiling painting, Canuti is notable as a sensitive draughtsman, whose drawings owe much to those by Ludovico Carracci and Guercino. He had a flourishing studio in Bologna, where Giuseppe Crespi, Giuseppe Maria Mazza and Lucrezia Scarfaglia worked. Canuti was also active as an engraver. Among his graphic works are portraits of Ludovico, Agostino, and Annibale Carracci, The Virgin in the Clouds with Christ, and St. Francis Praying after Guido Reni. Canuti died in Bologna on 6 April 1684, aged 59.

== Gallery ==
=== Frescoes ===
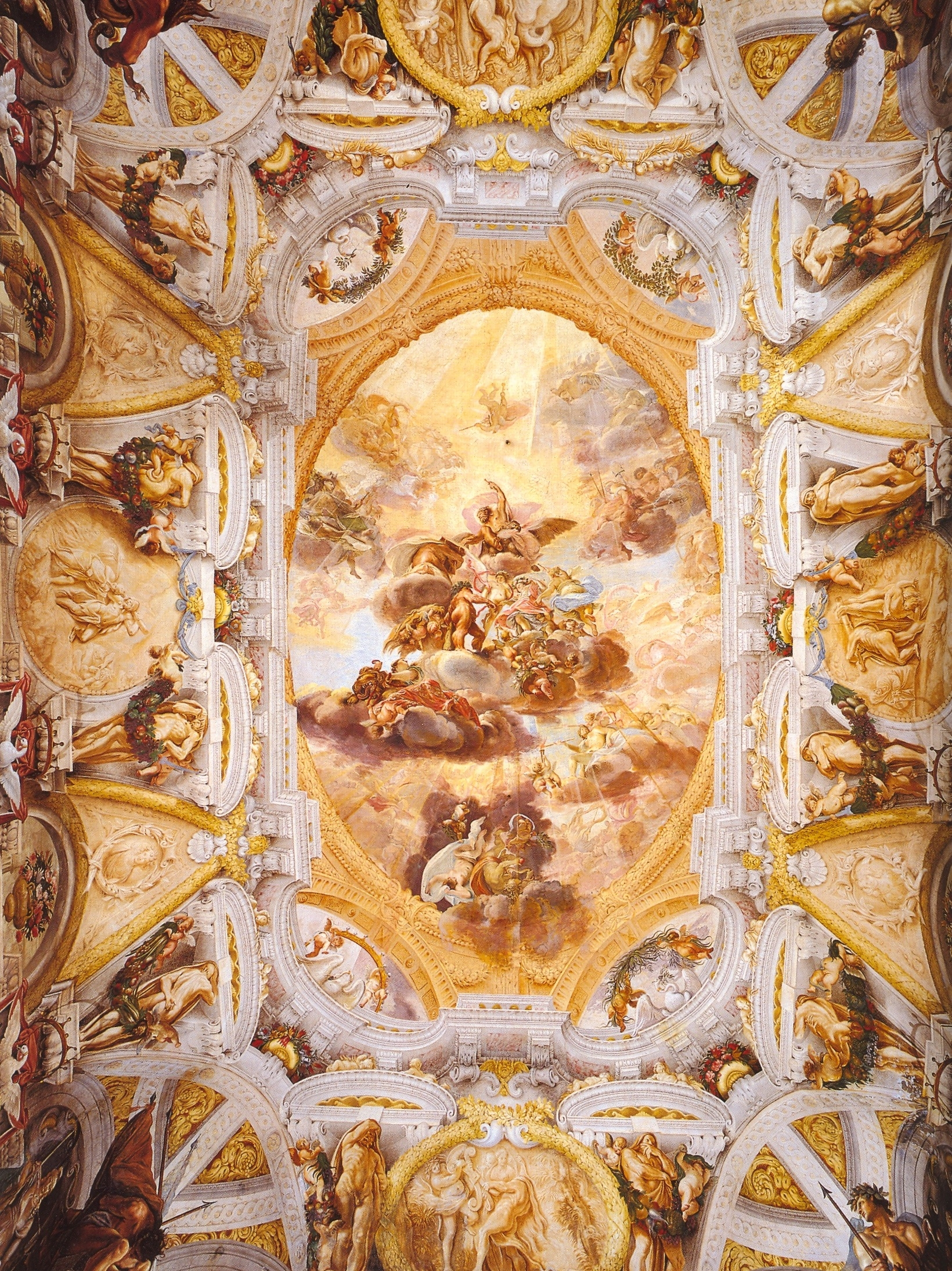
Apotheosis of Hercules on Olympus on the ceiling of the Gran Salone in the Palazzo Pepoli Campogrande

Apotheosis of Hercules on Olympus (detail)

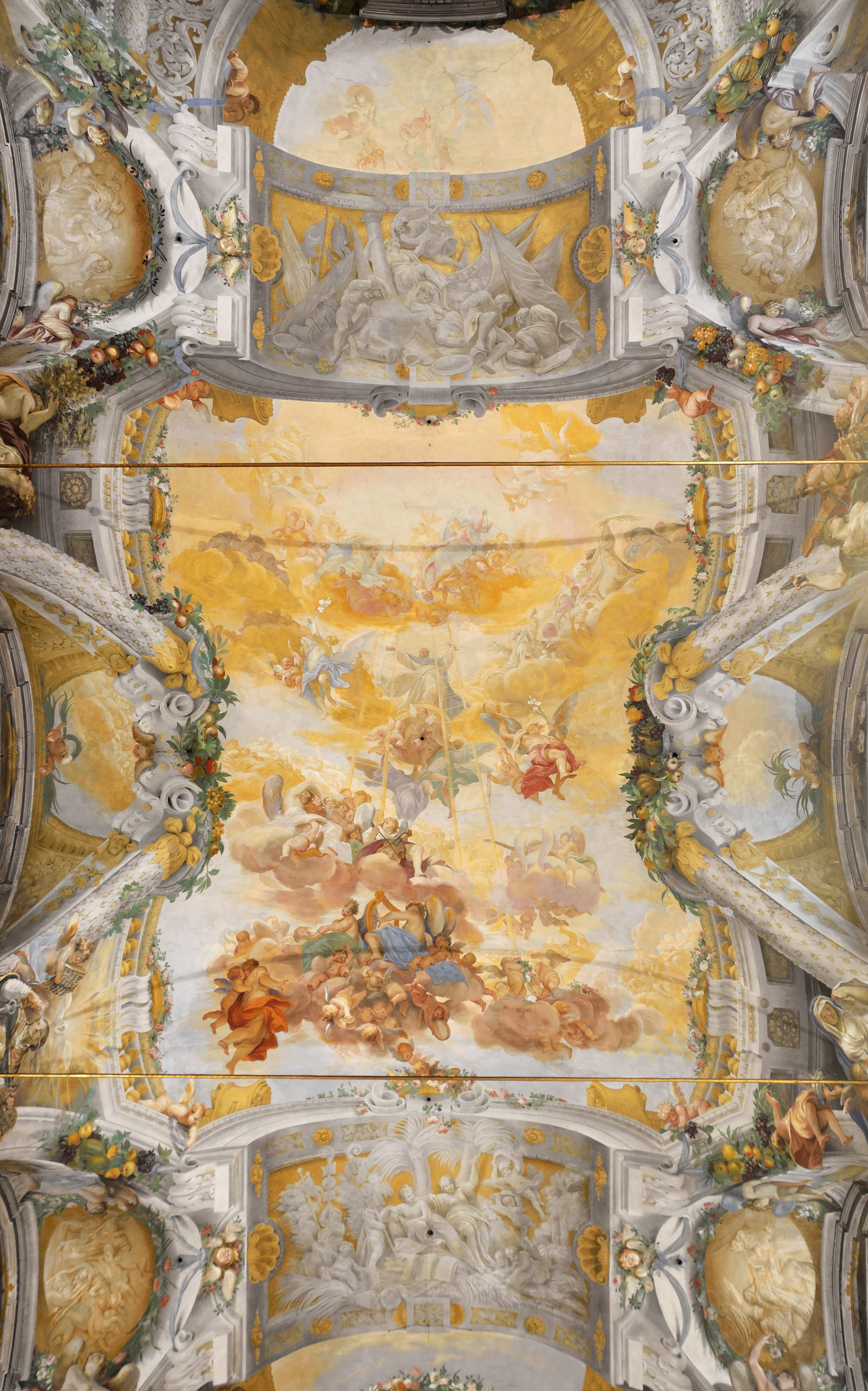
Apotheosis of St. Dominic on the vault and apse of Santi Domenico e Sisto

Apotheosis of Romulus on the antechamber ceiling of Palazzo Altieri

=== Drawings ===
Head of a Dominican Nun, 1673-1675, Art Institute of Chicago

Head of a soldier wearing a helmet (no date), priv. col.

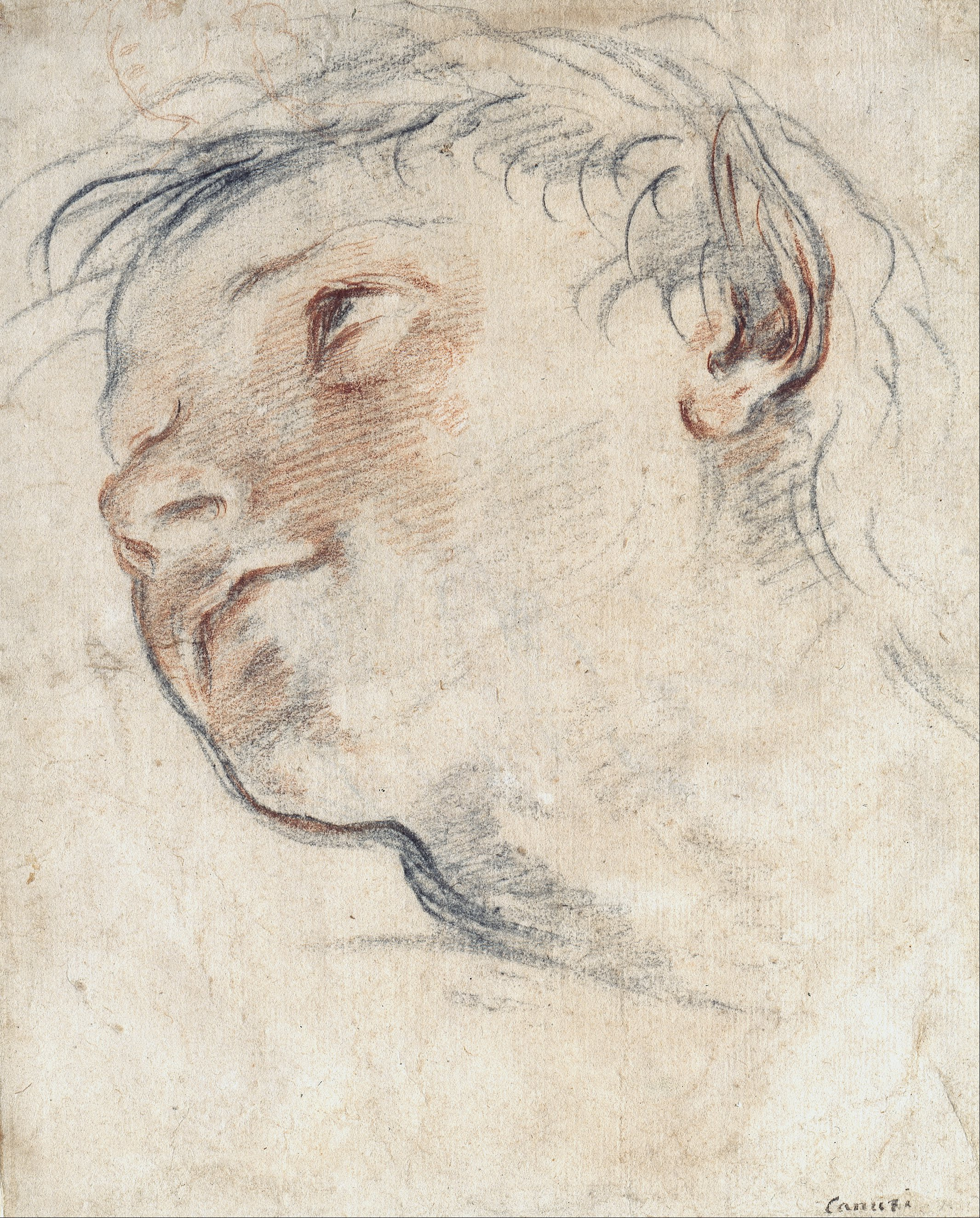
Study for the Head of a Faun, 1635, Museum Kunstpalast, Düsseldorf

Man's head in profile (no date), National Library of Brazil, Rio de Janeiro

=== Prints ===
Our Lady of the Rosary (no date), Cleveland Museum of Art

St. Roch (no date), Rijksmuseum, Amsterdam

Saint Francis of Assisi, 1643–44, Metropolitan Museum of Art, New York

St. Christina captured, 1650, Rijksmuseum, Amsterdam

== Bibliography ==
- Lanzi, Luigi (1847). Thomas Roscoe (ed.). History of Painting in Italy;From the Period of the Revival of the Fine Arts to the End of the Eighteenth Century. Vol. III. Henry G. Bohn, Covent Garden, London; Original from Oxford University Digitized Jan 31, 2007. pp. 100–101.
- Barbolini Armandi, Marina (1975). "Canuti, Domenico Maria". Dizionario Biografico degli Italiani (in Italian). Vol. 18: Canella–Cappello. Rome: Institute of the Italian Encyclopaedia. ISBN 978-88-12-00032-6.
