= Domenico Piò =

Italian sculptor

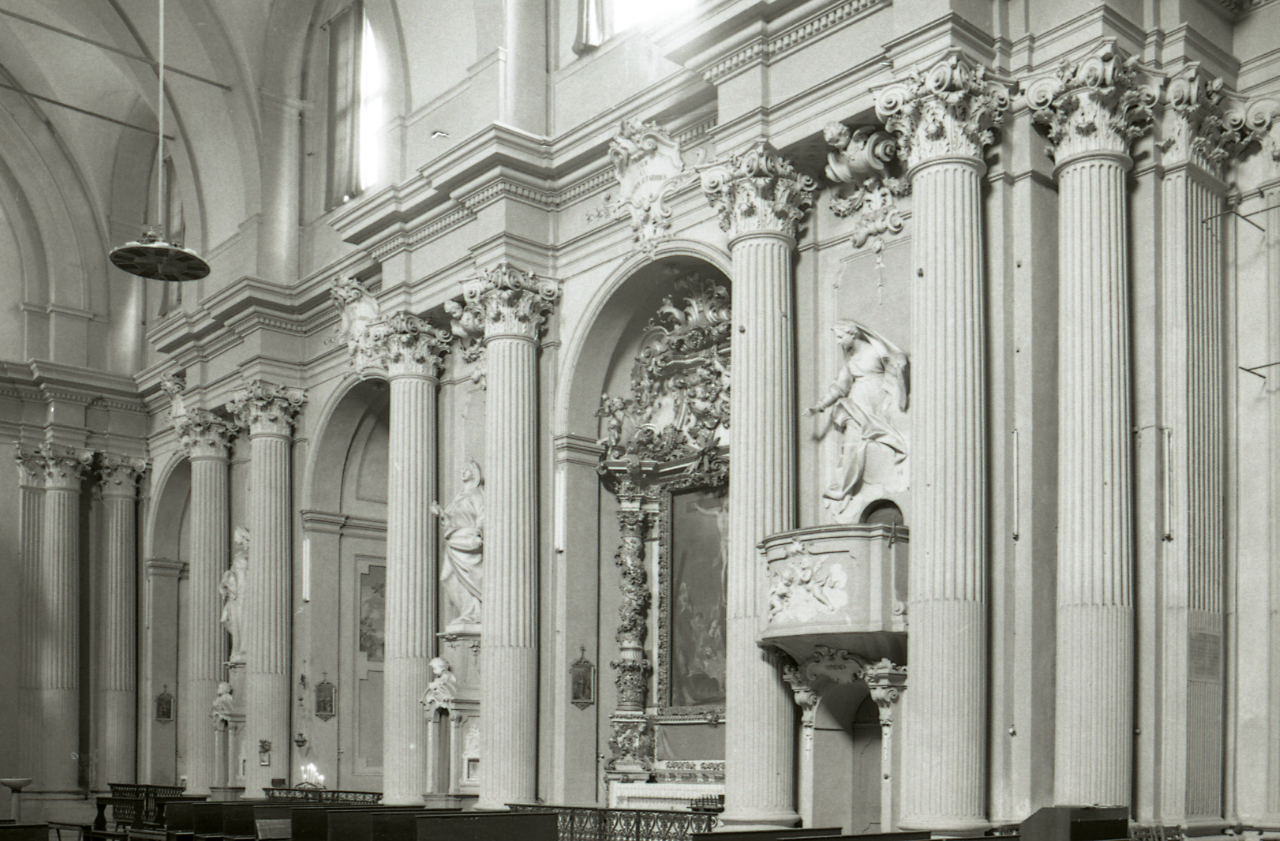
Angelo and Domenico Piò, decorations in the church of Sant'Agostino, Imola. Photo by Paolo Monti, 1975.

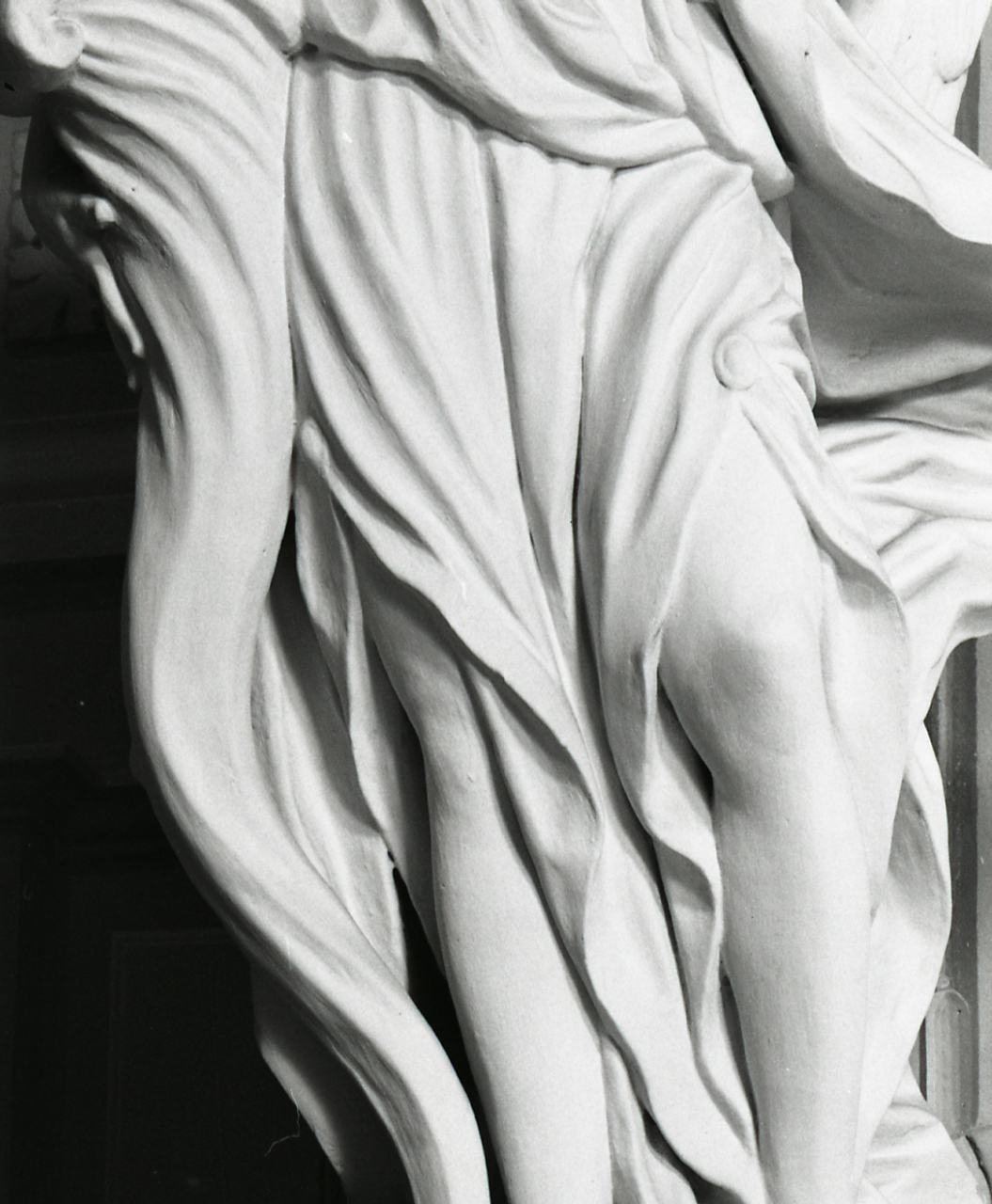
Detail of a sculpture in the church of Santa Maria delle Muratelle, Bologna. Photo by Paolo Monti, 1975.

Domenico Piò (1715–1801) was an Italian sculptor, active in Bologna in a late-Rococo style.

== Biography ==
He was born in Bologna and learned his trade and style from working with his father, Angelo Piò. He became secretary of the Accademia Clementina. Among Domenico's pupils was Gaetano Pignoni.

Apollo by Domenico Pio (Terracotta) Bemberg Foundation.

“Zeus” by Domenico Pio (Terracotta) Bemberg Foundation.
