= Pio (warehouse automation) =

Automated storage and retrieval systems for small businesses

- Inception: 2020
- Manufacturer: AutoStore
- Available: 2022
- Current supplier: Pio AS
- Models: P100, P200, P400, P600
- Website: pio.com

Pio is a compact automated storage and retrieval system (AS/RS) developed by AutoStore for small and medium-sized businesses.

The technology is based on the original AutoStore cube-storage system for warehouse automation, adapted for smaller e-commerce and retail companies that historically were unable to implement it due to its large footprint and the significant upfront capital investment it required. Pio was developed as a miniature version of the AutoStore system and introduced a different business model, charging customers for each item retrieved from the storage system.

The name "Pio" is derived from the phrase "product in/out".

== History ==
Pio originated from AutoStore, a cube-storage automated storage and retrieval system developed in Norway in the 1990s by engineer Ingvar Hognaland. His concept maximized storage density by removing traditional aisles and storing goods in bins stacked tightly in a cubic grid, with robots moving across the top of the grid to retrieve and deliver the bins.

By the early 2020s, AutoStore systems had been deployed internationally in e-commerce, retail, and logistics warehouses, but their scale and complexity limited adoption to large enterprises.

In 2020, Magne Hatteland, a nephew of AutoStore founder Jakob Hatteland, came up with the idea for a mini version of the system for smaller spaces. He installed such a system in his own home in Stavanger and used the Pio app on an iPad to manage storage and retrieval of his sports equipment and other personal items.

In 2021, AutoStore announced Pio as a new venture focused on smaller e-commerce businesses that had traditionally relied on manual warehouse operations or third-party logistics providers (3PLs).

== Technology and business model ==
Pio's technology includes four cube-storage automation systems: P100, P200, P400, and P600. The Pio P100 covers approximately 500 square feet (46 m²) of warehouse space; it includes 620 bins and two picking robots, each capable of performing about 120 picking operations per hour.

Pio combines a compact system footprint with a robot as a service model, in contrast to conventional AutoStore installations that typically require substantial upfront capital investment. Customers have to purchase the storage grid and bins while robots, workstations, and software are provided as part of an ongoing service with payments based on the system usage.

The system integrates with popular e-commerce platforms, such as Shopify.

== Adoption and economics ==
Although Pio was developed to lower the barriers to warehouse automation for small and medium-sized businesses, the implementation costs remain significant even in a compact configuration.

Practical Ecommerce noted that it remained uncertain whether compact warehouse automation systems could consistently provide competitive advantages for smaller e-commerce businesses. According to IoT Analytics, Equipment as a Service (EaaS) contracts accounted for less than 1% of global equipment sales in 2023, reflecting slower adoption than previously anticipated. At the same time, the firm’s Equipment as a Service Market Report 2024–2028 identified Pio among three examples of successful implementation of a Robotics as a Service (RaaS) business model.

== See also ==
- AutoStore
- Attabotics
- Kardex Group
