= AutoStore =

Manufacturer of automated storage and retrieval systems

AutoStore AS
- Type: Public
- Traded as: OSE: AUTO.OL
- Industry: Material handling, Logistics automation, Software
- Founded: June 23, 1995
- Founder: Jakob Hatteland
- Headquarters: Nedre Vats, Norway
- Area served: EMEA, North America, South America, APAC
- Key people: Mats Hovland Vikse (CEO)
- Services: Warehouse automation
- Revenue: US$538.6 million (2025)
- Number of employees: 1,032 (2025)
- Website: www.autostoresystem.com

AutoStore AS is a Norwegian manufacturer of automated storage and retrieval systems (AS/RS), that combine automation, software and AI to enable intelligent fulfillment. The company is headquartered in Nedre Vats, Norway, and operates globally with offices in Europe, the United States, Asia, and Australia. As of 2026, it has more than 1,000 employees and a global install base of nearly 1,950 systems in over 60 countries. AutoStore is publicly traded on the Oslo Stock Exchange under the ticker symbol AUTO.OL.

== History ==
AutoStore was founded in 1995. When IT entrepreneur Jakob Hatteland began selling computer components from a barn in Nedre Vats, his business, Hatteland Group, became Northern Europe’s largest distributor of electronic components. When a newly constructed warehouse reached full capacity within one month, Hatteland's technical director, Ingvar Hognaland, developed a compact robotic storage solution, which became the basis of AutoStore’s technology.

In 2000, Arrow Electronics acquired Hatteland Electronic, allowing Hatteland Group to invest further in AutoStore. The first commercial AutoStore system was installed in 2005 at Elotec, a Norwegian security equipment supplier.

In 2017, EQT acquired AutoStore for NOK 4 billion and later sold it in 2019 for NOK 15 billion to Thomas H. Lee Partners and EQT Private Equity, making AutoStore Norway’s first unicorn. In 2021, SoftBank purchased 40% of the company for NOK 23 billion.

AutoStore became listed on the Oslo Stock Exchange in October 2021, marking Norway’s largest IPO in two decades.

In 2023, CEO Karl Johan Lier retired and was succeeded by Mats Hovland Vikse.

In 2024, AutoStore opened a new U.S. headquarters in Salem, New Hampshire.

== Acquisitions and innovations ==
AutoStore acquired the Denver-based software company Locai in 2019, rebranding it in 2022 as the Qubit Fulfillment Platform. In 2021, it launched its Innovation Hub in Karmøy, Norway.

In 2022, AutoStore introduced Pio, a robotic solution for small and mid-sized businesses that historically were unable to implement the original cube-storage technology due to its large footprint and the significant upfront capital investment it required. Pio combined a compact system footprint with a robot as a service model, charging customers for each item retrieved from the storage system.

In 2025, the company launched its Multi-Temperature Solution for cold and frozen storage and CarouselAI, an AI-powered picking solution co-developed with Berkshire Grey.

== Services and technology ==
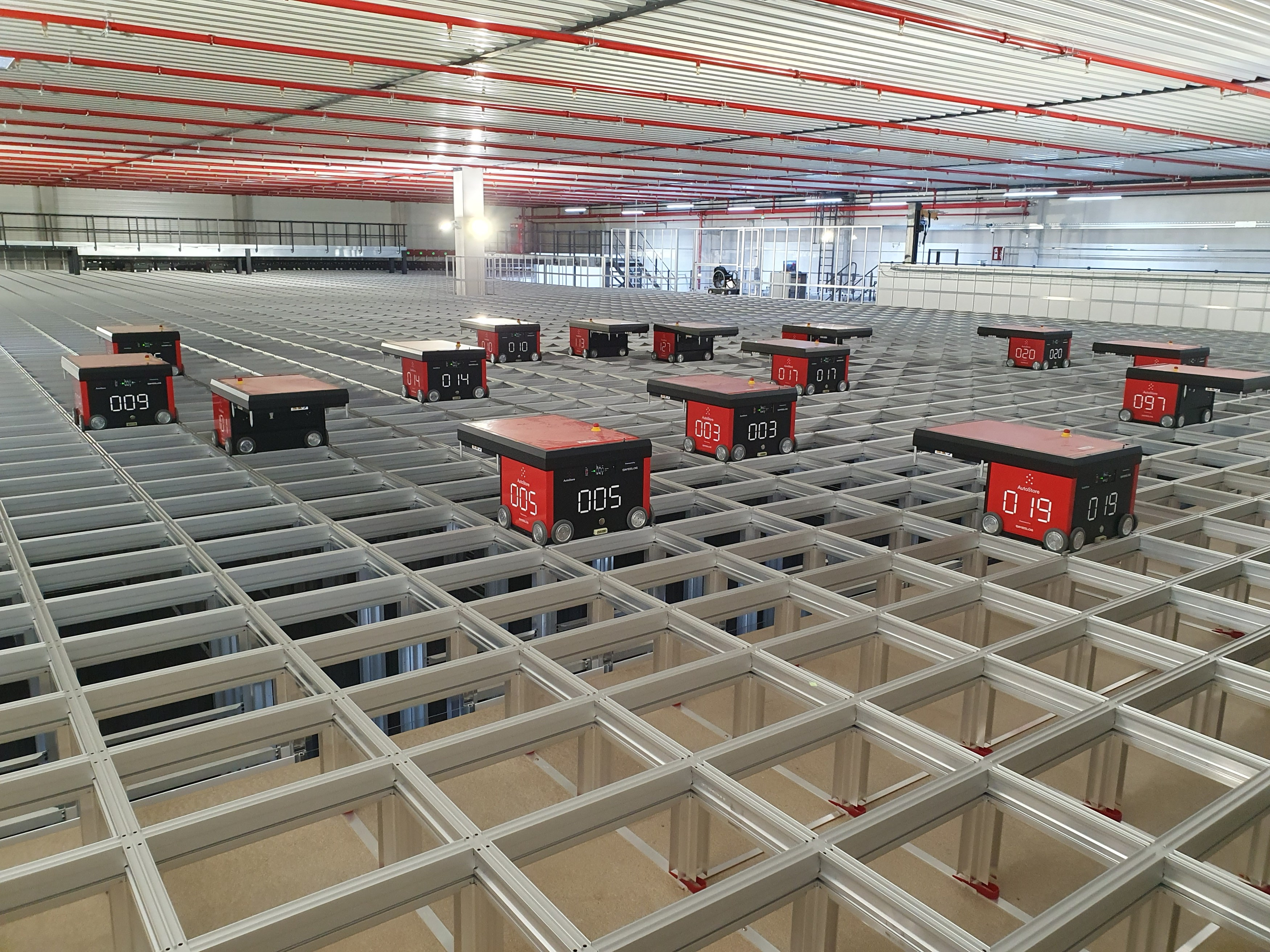
AutoStore robots

AutoStore’s cube-based goods-to-person (GTP) system uses robots to retrieve goods from a grid and deliver them to workstations. It eliminates the need for aisles or walkways and increases storage density by up to 400%. The system is modular, scalable, and energy efficient—ten robots use as much energy as a single vacuum cleaner. In a simulation-based academic study, the system’s performance in various warehouse configurations showed significant space and labor savings, confirming its value beyond manufacturer claims. The system is also interoperable with most third-party technologies. CVS, for example, uses AutoStore in combination with the Tompkins Robot tSort to process more than 2 million items per week at its Hainesport, NJ warehouse.

== Recognition ==
TIME magazine named CarouselAI one of “The Best Inventions of 2025.” In 2024, AutoStore was named one of Fast Company’s Most Innovative Companies, according to the original Fast Company listing.

== Intelligent fulfillment ==
In 2026, AutoStore publicly described a strategic shift toward intelligent fulfillment, a concept that extends warehouse automation with software, data integration, and artificial intelligence. Rather than focusing solely on executing tasks such as storage and retrieval, intelligent fulfillment systems are designed to monitor live operations, analyze performance data, and adjust system behavior to improve throughput, reliability, and predictability over time.

Industry analysts have observed a transition in logistics automation from traditional warehouse systems toward data-driven fulfillment environments that use real-time analytics and AI to adapt to changing demand and operating conditions. Vogue Business identified the same trend in the fashion industry, describing the future of smart warehousing as interconnected systems that enable intelligent, real-time decision-making across the supply chain.

== CubeVerse platform ==
At the center of AutoStore’s intelligent fulfillment strategy is CubeVerse, a cloud-based software platform introduced in 2026. CubeVerse is designed to connect data from system design, simulation, deployment, and live operations into a unified environment. The platform provides a foundation for analytics, optimization, and AI-based applications across the AutoStore lifecycle.

CubeVerse is intended to operate alongside existing warehouse management systems (WMS) and warehouse execution systems (WES), rather than replacing them.

== AutoStore Intelligence ==
AutoStore Intelligence is a suite of AI-driven capabilities embedded within the CubeVerse platform. Introduced alongside CubeVerse, it applies machine learning models trained on operational and simulation data to identify performance constraints, predict potential disruptions, and recommend or execute system optimizations. Reported use cases include routing optimization, system health monitoring, and performance benchmarking across sites.

Industry analysts have described this as a move toward self-optimizing fulfillment systems that can improve performance without requiring additional physical infrastructure.

== Global reach ==
As of 2026, AutoStore has a global installation base of nearly 1,950 systems in over 60 countries.

- Norway: XXL, Berggård Amundsen, Komplett, Get Inspired, ColliCare, Elektroimportøren
- United States: PUMA, Best Buy, Helly Hansen, GEODIS, Crocs, Chewy, Medline, Lids, HelloFresh, H Mart, H-E-B
- Germany: Lufthansa, Siemens, DHL, flaschenpost SE
- Brazil: Dafiti Group
- Italy: Benetton
- Netherlands: Active Ants
- Sweden: Boozt, Varner, Apotea
- United Kingdom: THG, ASDA
- Japan: FANUC, Pertronic, Toranoana, Hayabusa
- Singapore: GLS, Yusen Logistics
- Czech Republic: Rohlik
