= Corpus Domini, Bologna =

Roman Catholic church in Italy

Coordinates: 44°29′21″N 11°20′23″E

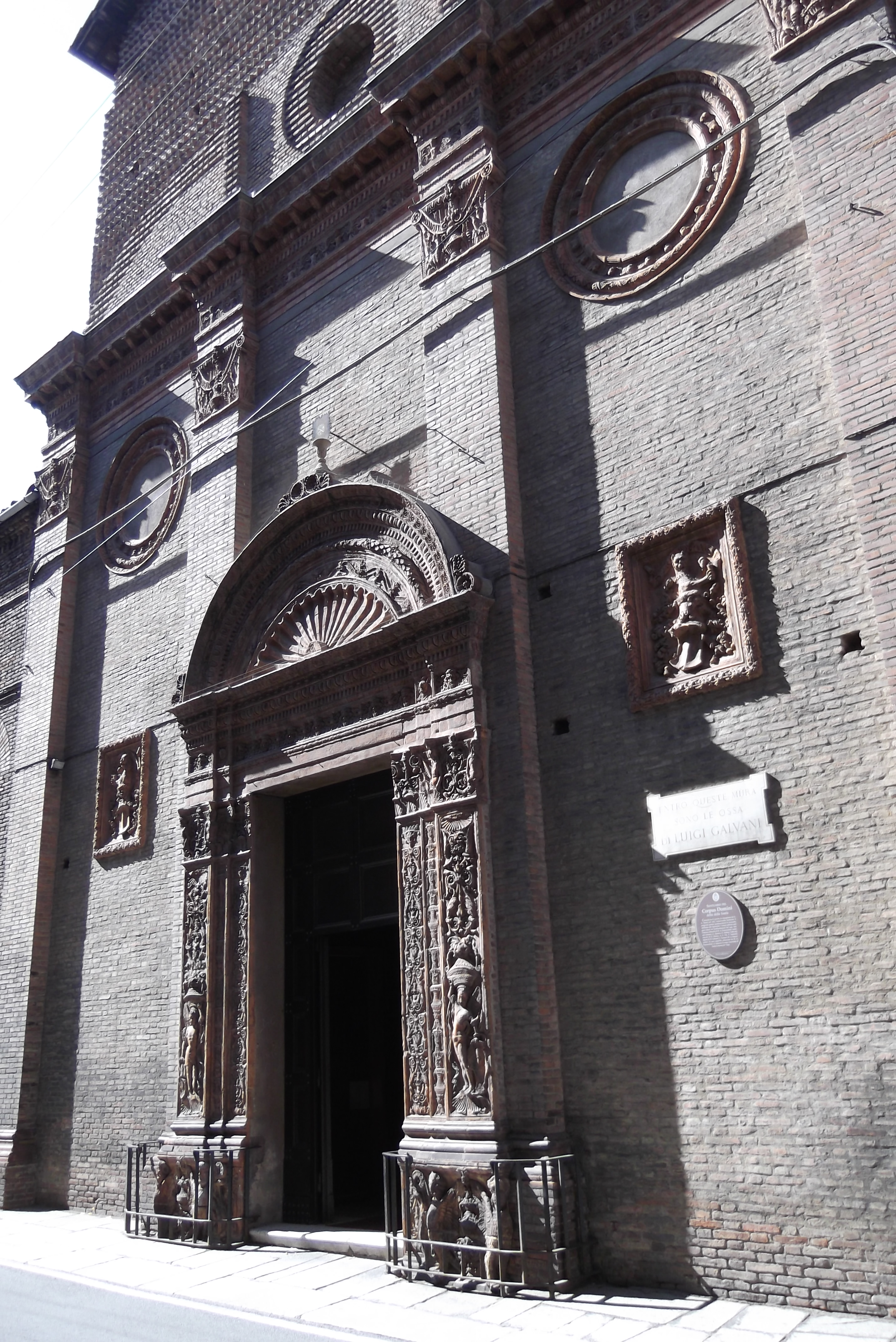
Façace

The Church of Corpus Domini, also known as the Chiesa della Santa, is a Roman Catholic church in Bologna. It is part of an active monastery complex of the order of Clarissan nuns, that is nuns of the contemplative Second Order of St. Francis. The monastery is semi-cloistered.

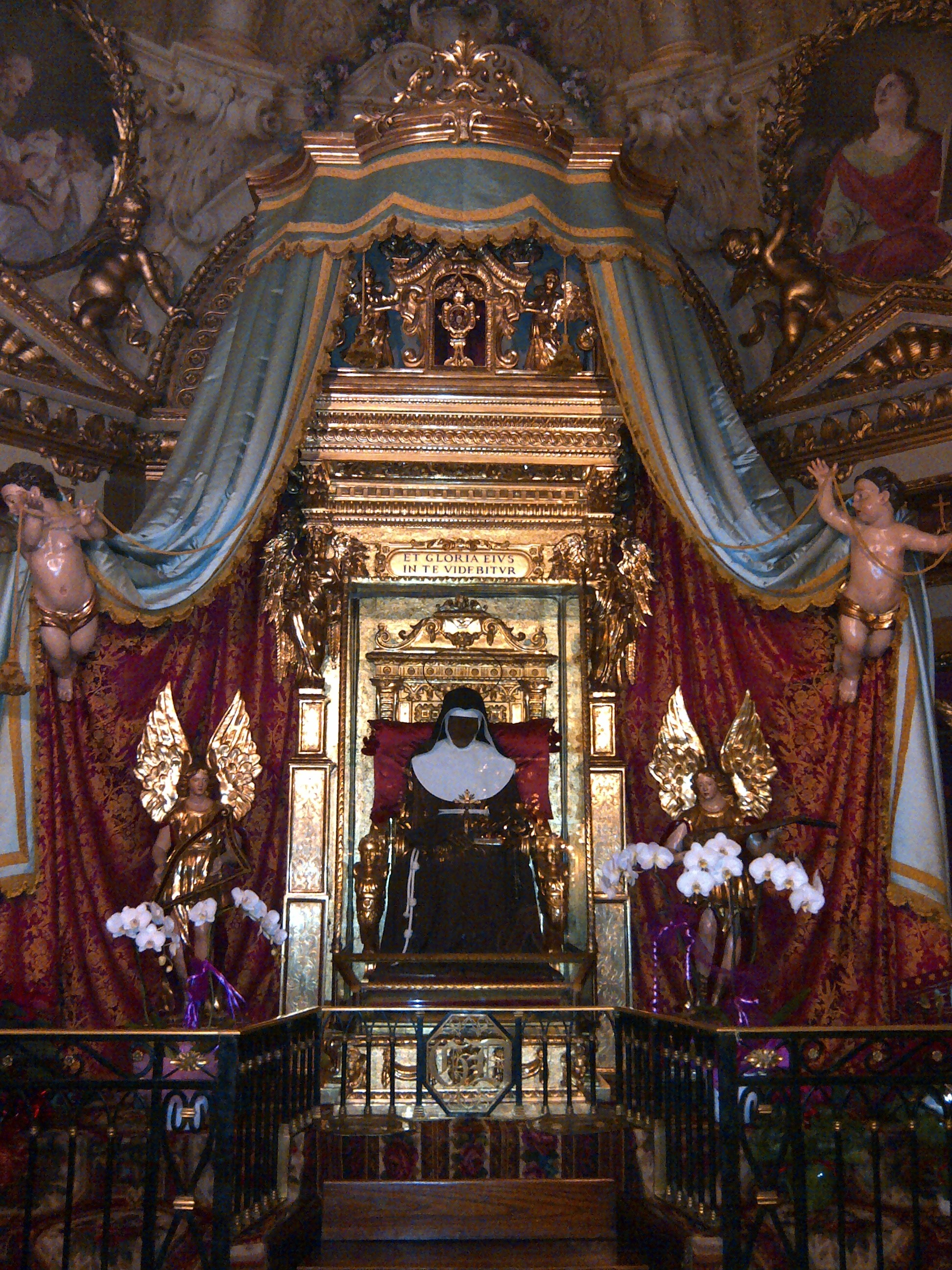
Incorrupt body of Saint Catherine of Bologna on throne

The complex hosts a museum dedicated to nurses and nursing, inaugurated by Cardinal Giorgio Gusmini in 1919. The museum has written and perhaps painted works of Saint Caterina de' Vigri, also known as Saint Catherine of Bologna (1413–1463). The church structure was built in 1478 and decorated in the 17th century, among the works are:

- Frescoes of a "Glory of Angels" in apse and "Evangelists" in medallions by Marcantonio Franceschini
- Floral decoration by Enrico Haffner
- Quadratura by Luigi Quaini
- Stucco work by Giuseppe Maria Mazza

The church allows visitors to enter an adjacent site to see and pray to the enthroned mummified corpse of the 15th-century Clarisse nun and saint, canonized in the 18th century.
