= Antonio Pio (composer) =

Italian composer

- Born: 1753
- Died: 1795 (aged 41–42)
- Era: Classical

Antonio Pio (1753 in Ravenna – 1795) was an Italian composer. He spent several years in St. Petersburg as a music teacher at the Russian court, following Paisiello and Cimarosa. His oratorio Gionata was composed for a festival of the Virgin Mary in his home town in 1779.
