= Giuseppe Maria Mazza =

Bolognese sculptor

- Born: 13 May 1653; Bologna, Papal States
- Died: 6 June 1741 (aged 88); Bologna, Papal States
- Occupation: Sculptor
- Known for: Terracotta statuettes and reliefs
- Movement: Baroque

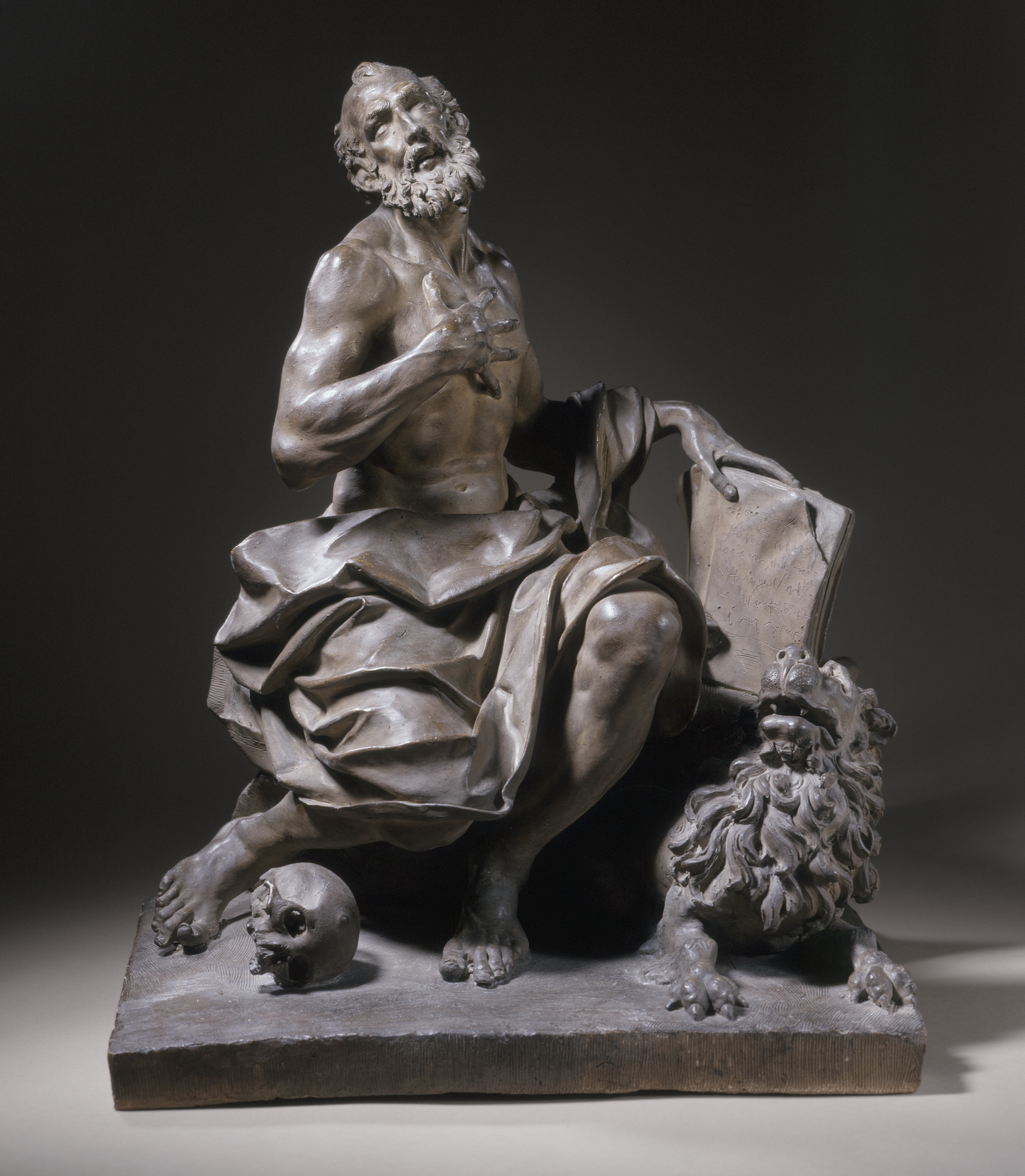
Saint Jerome (1676) Terracotta sculpture from Bologna, as of 2012 held in the Los Angeles County Museum of Art

Giuseppe Maria Mazza (13 May 1653 – 6 June 1741) was one of the leading sculptors of Bologna, Italy, in the late 17th and early 18th centuries. He was trained as a painter, but is best known for his fine sculptural work in terracotta and stucco.

== Life ==
Mazza was born in Bologna on 13 May 1653, the son of Camillo Mazza (1602–1672). His father was a sculptor who had studied under Alessandro Algardi in Rome, and who worked in Bologna, Padua and Venice. He trained as a sculptor under his father for a while, then studied painting in Bologna under the fresco painter Domenico Maria Canuti. He painted in Carlo Cignani's life classes. He also studied with Lorenzo Pasinelli. He seems to have returned to sculpture after having left Canuti with the painter Giovanni Gioseffo dal Sole and studied at a private school in the Palazzo Fava in Bologna.

Mazza became a successful and prolific sculptor, producing many statuettes and reliefs in terracotta. Mazza's fully finished terracotta statuettes were intended for cabinet display in the homes of wealthy art lovers. Prince Johann Adam Andreas of Liechtenstein, an art connoisseur, was introduced to Mazza in 1691 by the painter Marcantonio Franceschini. The Prince and Mazza were in correspondence between 1692 and 1702, and Mazza provided a number of works. The Prince tried to persuade Mazza to move to Vienna, but without success. Mazza undertook many commissions for churches.

Giuseppe Mazza died in Bologna on 6 June 1741 at the age of 88. The sculptor Angelo Piò and Lorenzo Sarti were among Mazza's pupils. A road in Bologna carries his name.

== Work ==
Mazza painted the figures of adoring angels in a painting of the Virgin and Child displayed in the Cappella Maggiore of Bologna Cathedral. The church of the Corpus Domini in Bologna has a Virgin and Child and two large angels by Mazza, who also made the bas-reliefs of the high altar.

Most of Mazza's work had religious themes, but he sometimes depicted mythological or secular subjects. Mazza made a number of works for Prince Andreas of Liechtenstein that depicted mythological subjects, including six marble busts and twelve terracotta groups, as well as two marble statues and three terracotta models for vases. The Prince had all the terracotta works copied in stone for his gardens at Rossau.

Between 1686 and 1695, Mazza participated, along with the architect Giacomo Monti (1620-1692) and the painter Marcantonio Franceschini (1648-1729), in the renovation of the Corpus Domini church in Bologna. He contributed reliefs and plaster statues. The statues of St Francis and St Clare on the left and right of the high altar were based on Franceschini's basic designs. He made large bronze reliefs for the Church of San Clemente, Venice.In 1722, he made five large bronze reliefs depicting the miracles of Saint Dominic for the Chapel of San Dominico in the church of Santi Giovanni e Paolo, Venice.

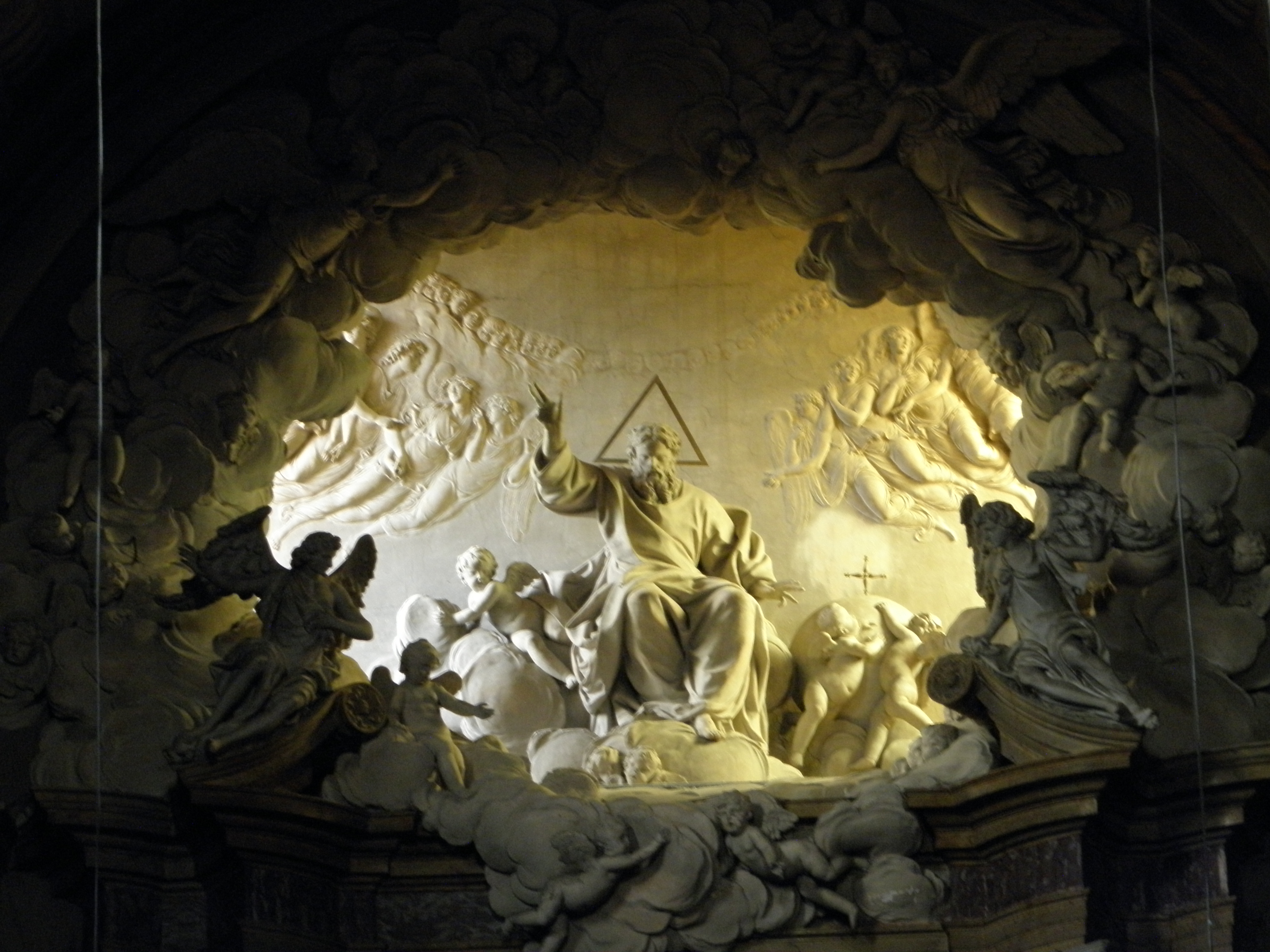
The "Gloria" on the vault above the altar Minerbio

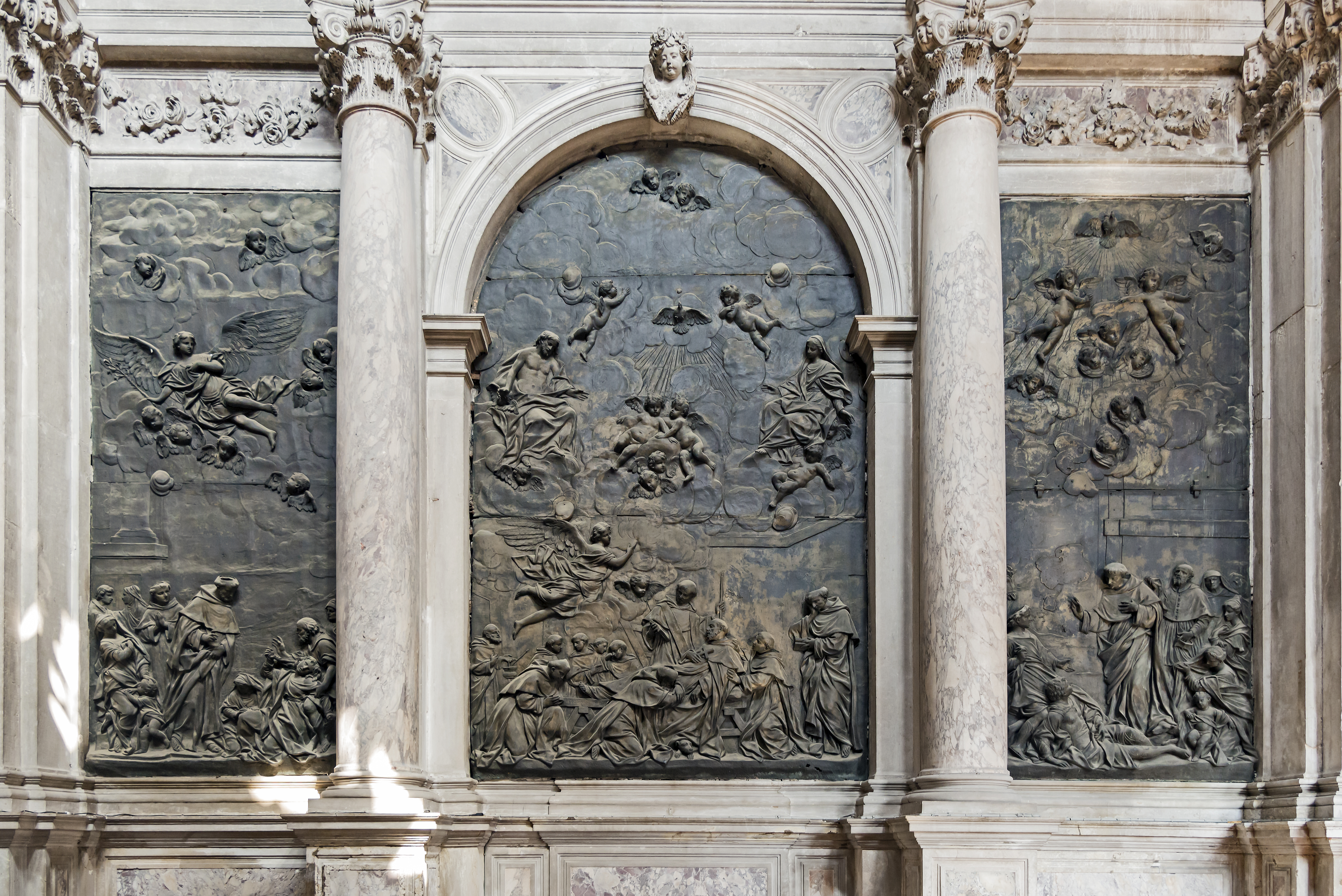
Chapel of San Dominico Santi Giovanni e Paolo, Venice

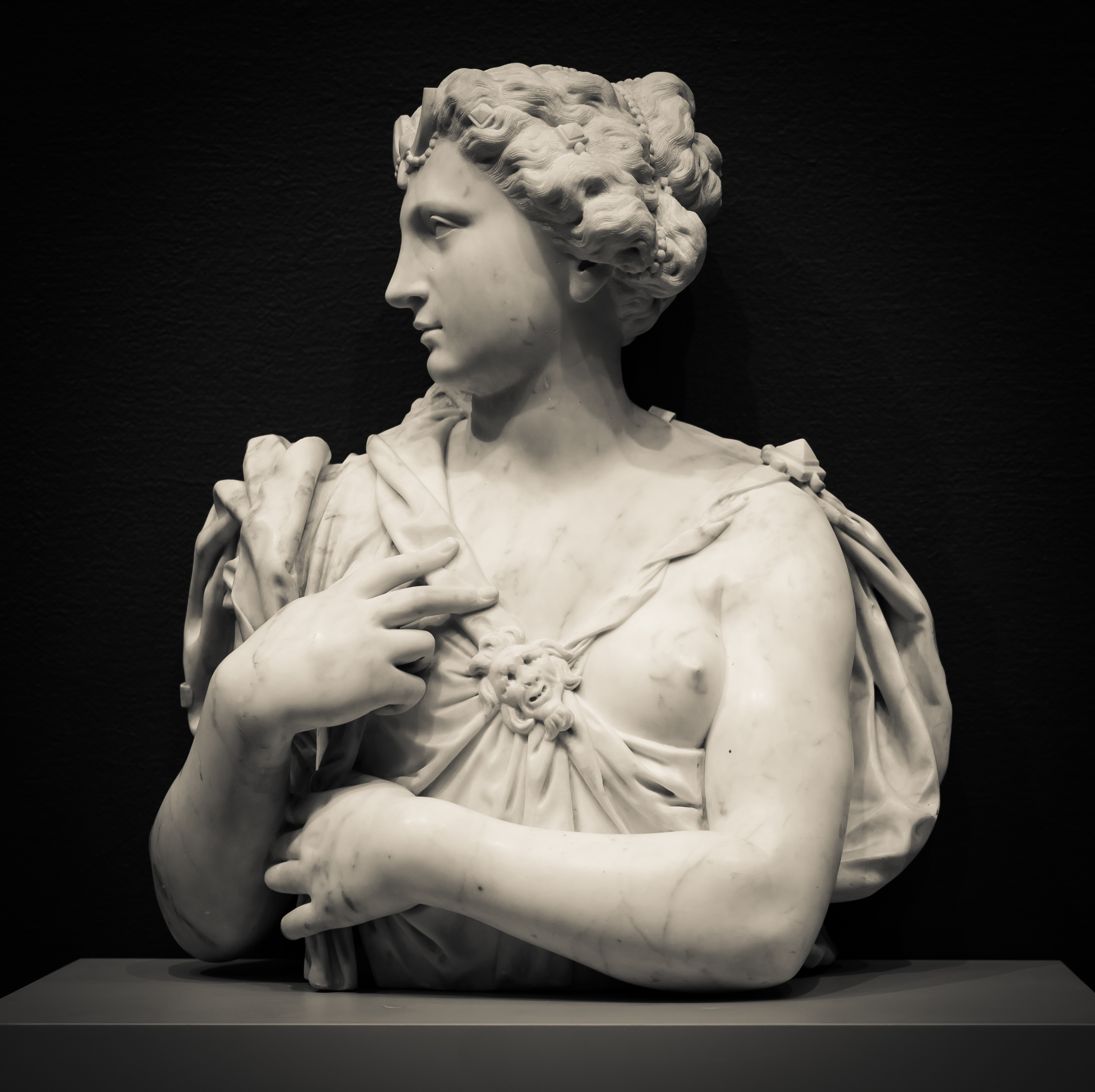
"Diana," ca. 1692-93

== Style ==
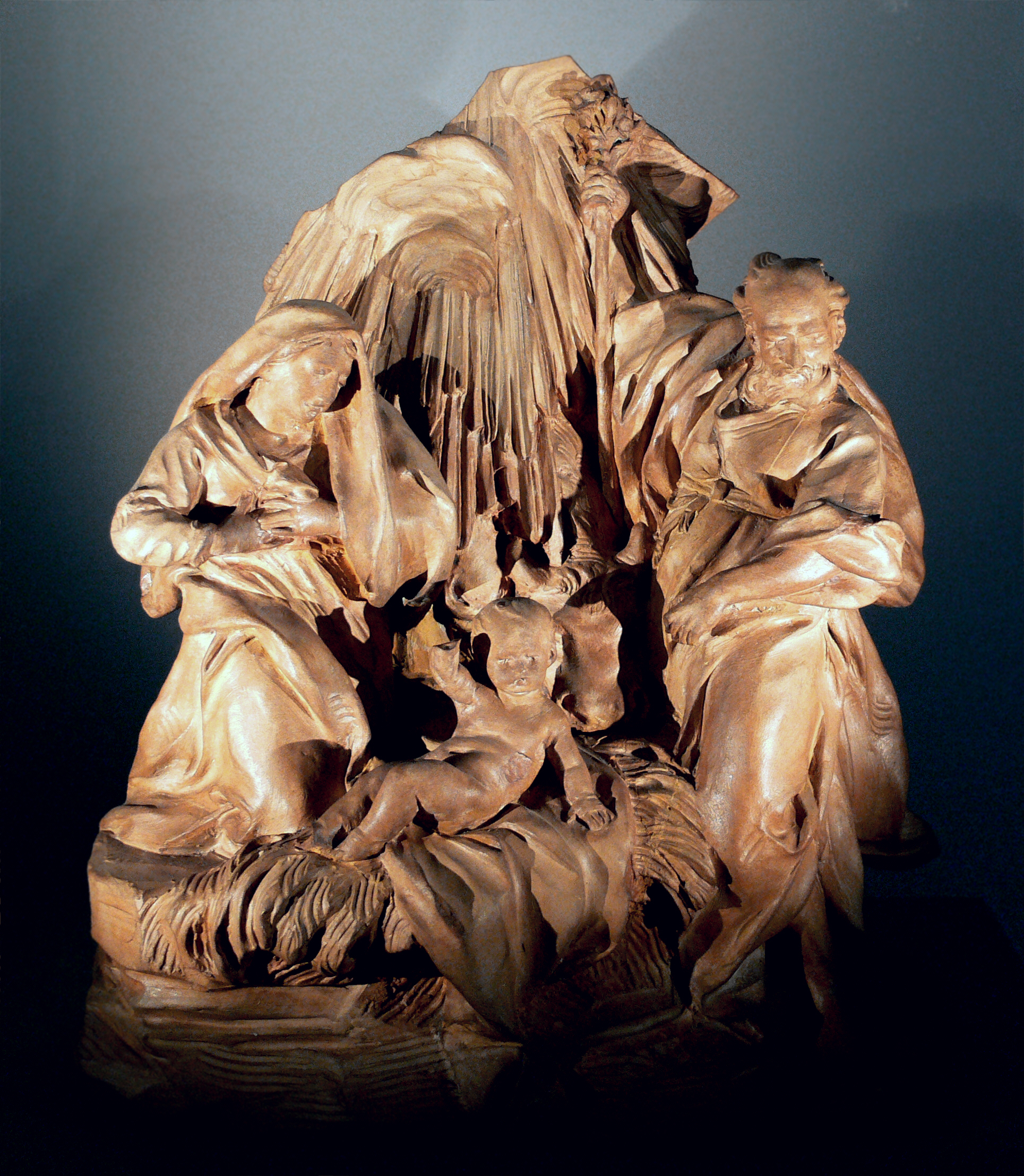
Holy Family, Bavarian National Museum, Munich

Mazza mainly worked in terracotta, as in the Lamentation of Christ in St. Mary Magdalene, Bologna, and in stucco as in the churches of Corpus Domini in Bologna, the Annunciata in Pesaro and the Suffragio in Fano. His early training as a painter is reflected in his later work. His sculptures have a pictorial quality. They are balanced and self-contained. His work shows the influence of Algardi but has the vivacity of 18th-century styles. This contrasts with the High Baroque style that was then in fashion in Rome.
