= Master of the Baroncelli Portraits =

Flemish painter

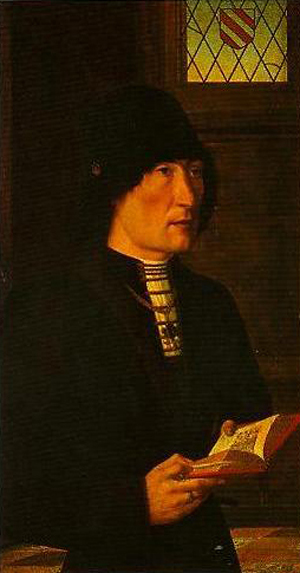
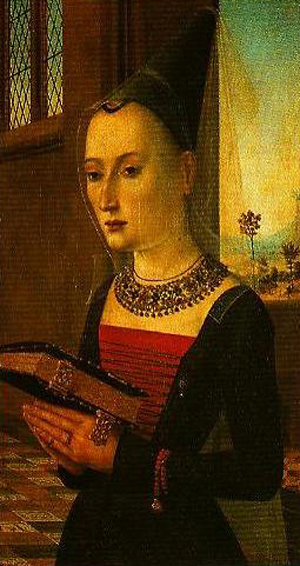
The Baroncelli Portraits, now in the Uffizi in Florence

The Master of the Baroncelli Portraits (fl. 1480–1490) is the notname for a fifteenth-century Early Netherlandish painter.

Active in Bruges around 1480–1490, he is named after a pair of portraits (originally the wings of a triptych) of the Italian banker Pierantonio Baroncelli and his wife Maria Bonciani, which are now in the collection of the Uffizi Gallery in Florence. Only a few other works by the same master are known. A Pentecost, the provenance of which can be traced back to Bruges, ca. 1600, was sold in 2010 at Christie's for £4,185,250.

The Master is supposed to have been influenced by Hans Memling and Petrus Christus. His work, and especially the Pentecost, has been influential on later artists from Bruges, in particular Simon Bening.

== Works attributed to the Master of the Baroncelli Portraits ==
- Two portraits of Italian banker Pierantonio Baroncelli and his wife Maria Bonciani, residents of Bruges: these paintings, now in the Uffizi Gallery, gave the painter his Notname.
- Annunciation, Royal Museum of Fine Arts Antwerp
- Annunciation, private collection, Amsterdam
- Pentecost, sold at Christie's in 2010 for £4,185,250, now in a private collection, on display at the Groeningemuseum
- Saint Catherine of Bologna (also known as A Female Saint with a Donor and Two Women), Courtauld Institute
- Marriage Diptych, Courtauld Institute
- Virgin and Child with Angels, Bode Museum
- Madonna Enthroned, Capilla Real de Madrid
