= Woman Searching for Fleas =

Painting by Giuseppe Crespi

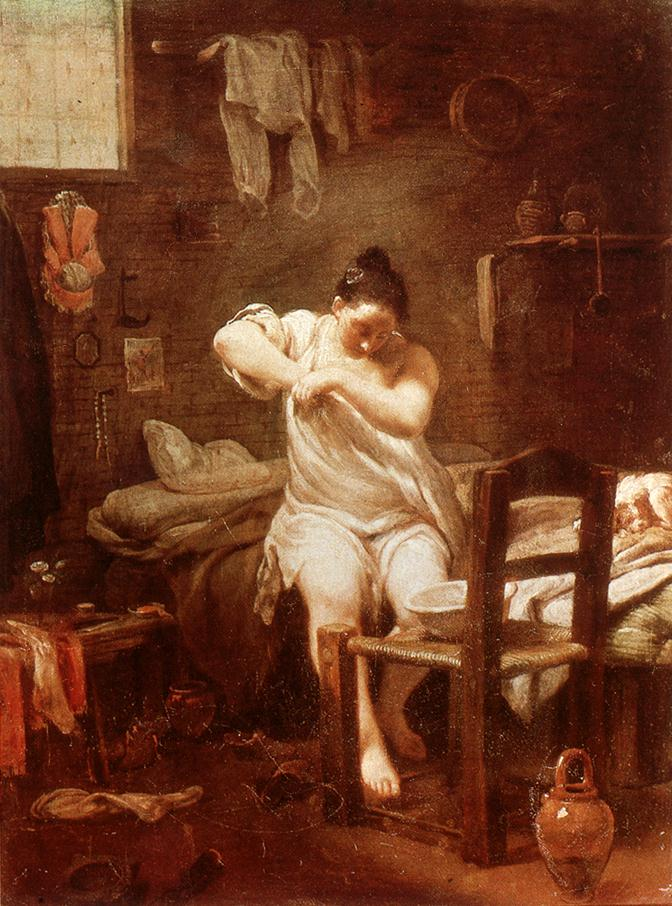
Woman Searching for Fleas (1710-1730) by Giuseppe Maria Crespi

Woman Searching for Fleas (Italian - Cercatrice di pulci), The Flea (La pulce) or Woman Getting out of Bed (Donna che si alza dal letto) is a 1710-1730 oil on copper painting by Giuseppe Maria Crespi, a painter from Bologna. The main version is now in the collection of the Uffizi in Florence, whilst variants survive, including one at the Museo nazionale di palazzo Reale in Pisa, also originating in the Guardaroba of the Grand Dukes of Tuscany.

Art critics are uncertain whether the work is a single one or - as asserted by Longhi - one in a series of oil on copper works showing scenes from everyday life.

== Display history ==
- Mostra del Settecento bolognese, Bologna, 1935
- Mostra celebrativa di Giuseppe Maria Crespi, Bologna, 1948
- Artisti alla corte granducale, Firenze, 1969
- Giuseppe Maria Crespi nei Musei fiorentini, Firenze, 1993

== Bibliography ==
- (in Italian) Mostra del Settecento bolognese: catalogo. Bologna, Palazzo comunale, Bologna, Coop. tip. Mareggiani, 1935, SBN IT\ICCU\RAV\0023805.
- (in Italian) M. Chiarini, Artisti alla corte granducale: Palazzo Pitti, Appartamenti monumentali, maggio-luglio 1969, Firenze, Centro Di, 1969, SBN IT\ICCU\SBL\0100792.
- (in Italian) Gallerie degli Uffizi, Gli Uffizi: Catalogo generale, Firenze, Centro Di, 1980, p. 233 [1979], SBN IT\ICCU\RAV\0060995.
- (in Italian) Mira Pajes Merriman, Giuseppe Maria Crespi, Milano, Rizzoli, 1980, SBN IT\ICCU\RAV\0188059.
- (in Italian) Andrea Emiliani (ed.), Giuseppe Maria Crespi, 1665-1747, Bologna, Credito romagnolo-Nuova Alfa editoriale, 1990, SBN IT\ICCU\UBO\0084603.
- (in Italian) Giuseppe Maria Crespi nei Musei fiorentini: Firenze, Uffizi, Sala delle Reali poste, 3 giugno-1 agosto 1993, Firenze, Centro Di, 1993, SBN IT\ICCU\VEA\0053000.
