= Ingenuity =

Ingenuity may refer to:

- Ingenuity (helicopter), part of NASA's Mars 2020 mission
- Ingenuity (Crespi), a 1690s painting
- Ingenuity (album), a 1994 Ultravox album
- QIAGEN Silicon Valley, formerly Ingenuity Systems, a biotechnology software company
- THG Ingenuity, an e-commerce service of THG plc

== See also ==
- Creativity
- Ingenious (disambiguation)
