= Giovanni Zanardi =

Italian painter

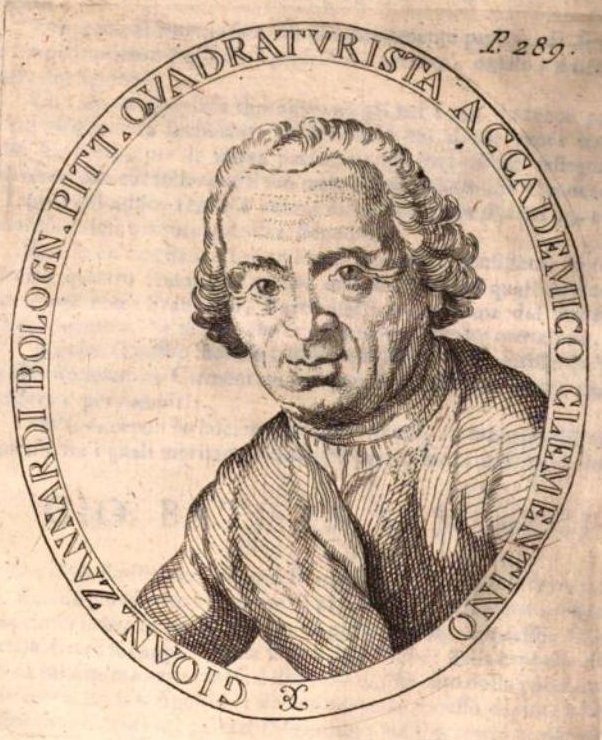
Portrait of Giovanni Zanardi

Giovanni Zanardi (1700 in Bologna – 1769) was an Italian painter of quadratura during the late Baroque period.

== Biography ==
He studied under Stefano Orlandi, and became known as lo zoppetto dell'Orlandi. He traveled to Malta to paint the church of San Giovanni Battista, Bologna. Returning to Bologna, he worked briefly again with Orlandi in a ceiling of the Aldrovandi palace. He also helped fresco the Bolognese lodgings of the Stuart English pretender in 1720.

He helped restore the frescoes in the Palazzo de' Zamboni for the Princess of Mirandola. Along with Antonio Dardani, he helped decorate the Teatro Reggio of Modena. With the figure painter Coletti, he helped decorate the palazzo di delizia of Rivabella. In 1723, back in Bologna, he painted with Francesco Monti the ceiling of the sacristy of the oratory of the Casa Bianchini al Lavino.

Along with Leonardo Sconzani, he painted a canvas remembering the funeral celebrations for the Senator Ranuzzi held in the church of Santa Maria Maggiore, Bologna, in 1725. Together they also collaborated in the chapel of the Oratorian Church in Forlì till 1726. He was made an honorary academic in the Accademia Clementina in 1767.

He was very prolific in Bologna and surrounding towns, painting in the following sites:

- Chapel of the Cappuccini in Cartel Pietro
- Boccaferri Palace
- Villa of Marchese Paparini
- Chapels in the church of Castello San Giovanni (Nicola Bertuzzi painted figures)
- Burial chapel of Santa Maria Maggiore in Bologna (with Francesco Monti)
- Burial chapel for the poor of Bologna
- Oratorian church in Brescia (1738)
- House of Count Girolamo and Luigi Avogadro in Bologna
- Church of Santo Spirito (Benedictines) in Bologna
- House of Count Federico Martinengo in Bologna
- Casa Suardi in Bologna
- Church of Sale Marasino on the shores of Lago d'Iseo
- Chapel of the Rosary in the parish church of Urago d'Oglio
- Ceiling of the Church of the Carmelitans of Urago
- Ceiling of the church of Terra di Grumello (1760)
- Theater in the College of the Somaschi Brothers

== See also ==
- Gaifami Palace
