= Raimondo Manzini =

Raimondo Manzini may refer to:

- Raimondo Manzini (painter)
- Raimondo Manzini (journalist)

== See also ==
- Manzini (disambiguation)
