= Ingenious =

Ingenious may refer to:

- Ingenious (board game), 2004, by Reiner Knizia
- Ingenious (2009 American film), a drama comedy romance
- Ingenious (2009 British film), a television family drama
- Ingenious Media (styled as INGENIθUS), a UK media, infrastructure and real estate company

== See also ==
- Ingenuity (disambiguation)
