= Palazzo Vecchio de' Medici, Pisa =

Coordinates: 43.7146°N 10.4068°E

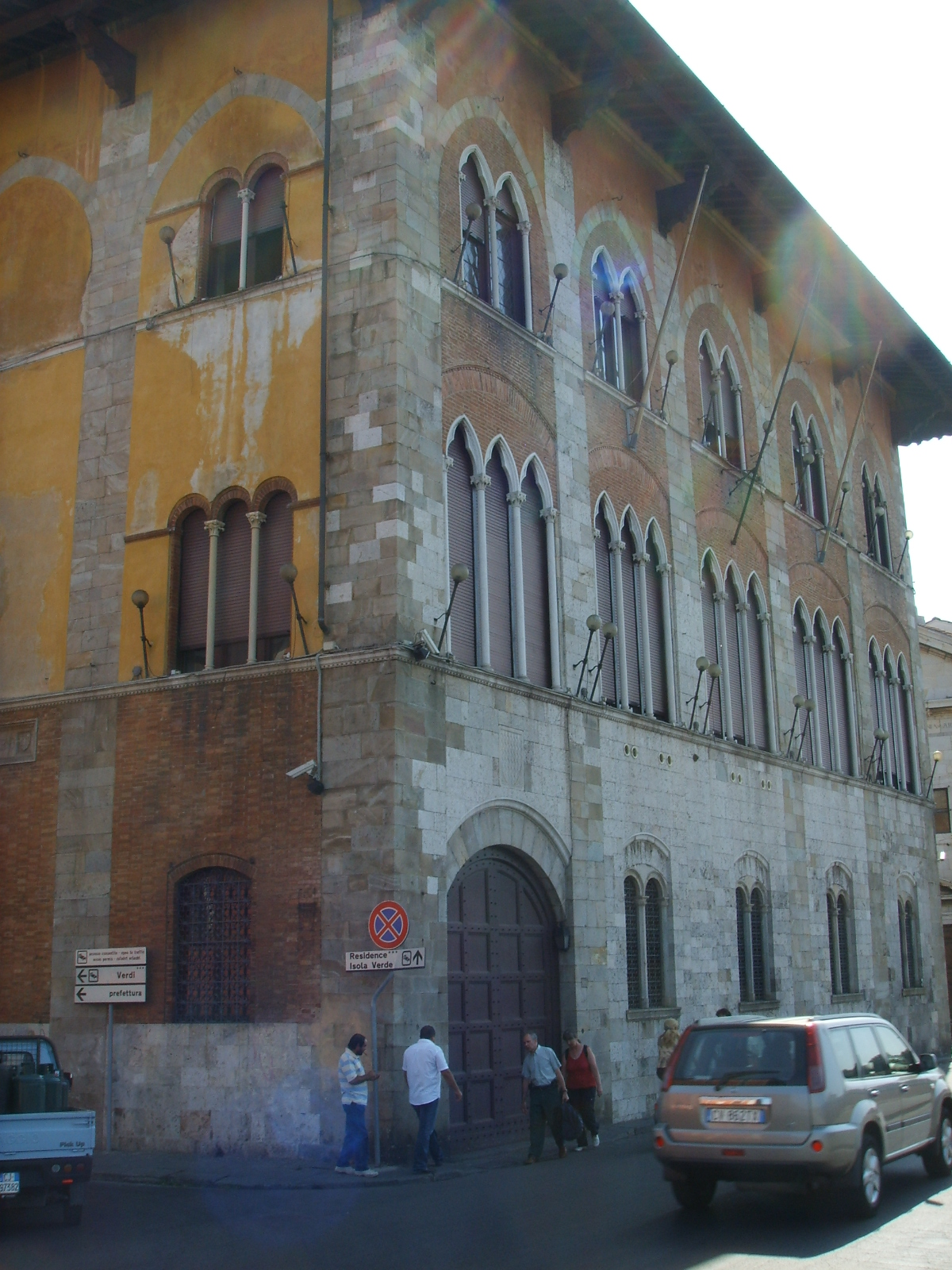
Façade of Palace

The Palazzo Vecchio de' Medici, also called the Palazzo della Prefettura is a Gothic revival-style palace located on Piazza Giuseppe Mazzini #7, in the city of Pisa, region of Tuscany, Italy.

== History ==
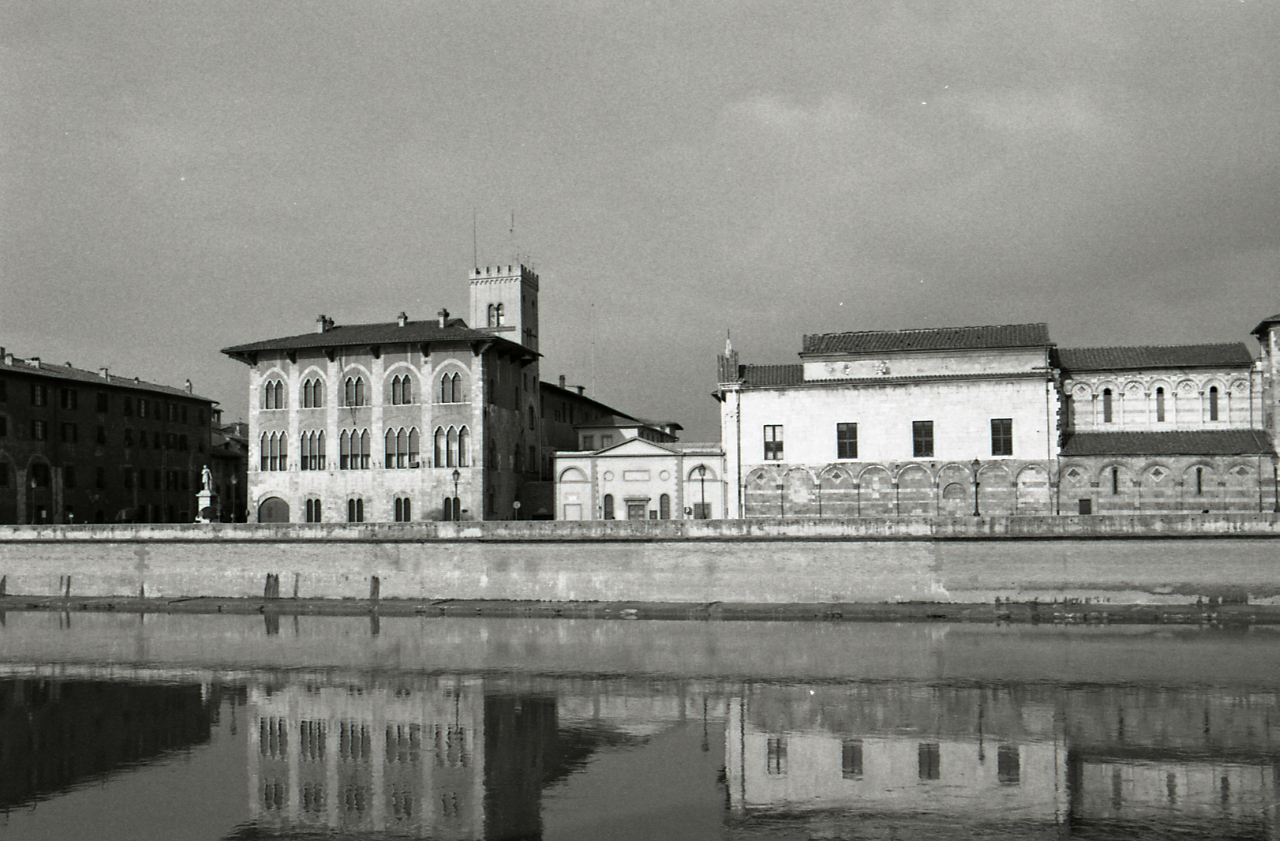
View of the lungarno Mediceo with Palazzo Medici (left) and the church and convent of San Matteo, in a photo by Paolo Monti, 1973

The palace was erected at the site of a house with a tower, built in the 11th century by the aristocratic Albizone (or Albitone) family.

The palace was the residence in 1539, of Cosimo I de’ Medici, and further refurbished by Eleonora of Toledo. In 1574 Francesco I de' Medici erected a new Medici Palace (Palazzo Reale) in town, and by 1784, this Palace became property of Jacopo Finocchietti.

The present façade was commissioned by Marchesa Vittoria Spinola (Morganatic daughter of Victor Emmanuel II), per the designs of Ranieri Simonelli. This architect replaced the façade windows of the first and second floor with gothic mullioned windows, and erected a tower with merlons (1879).

The palace now houses the prefecture.
