= Monastery of San Paolo d'Argon =

Monastery in San Paolo d'Argon, Italy

The Monastery of San Paolo d'Argon was a Benedictine monastery, with convent and church, in the town of San Paolo d'Argon, in the province of Bergamo, region of Lombardy, Italy. It was decorated by premier painters of the late-Baroque era.

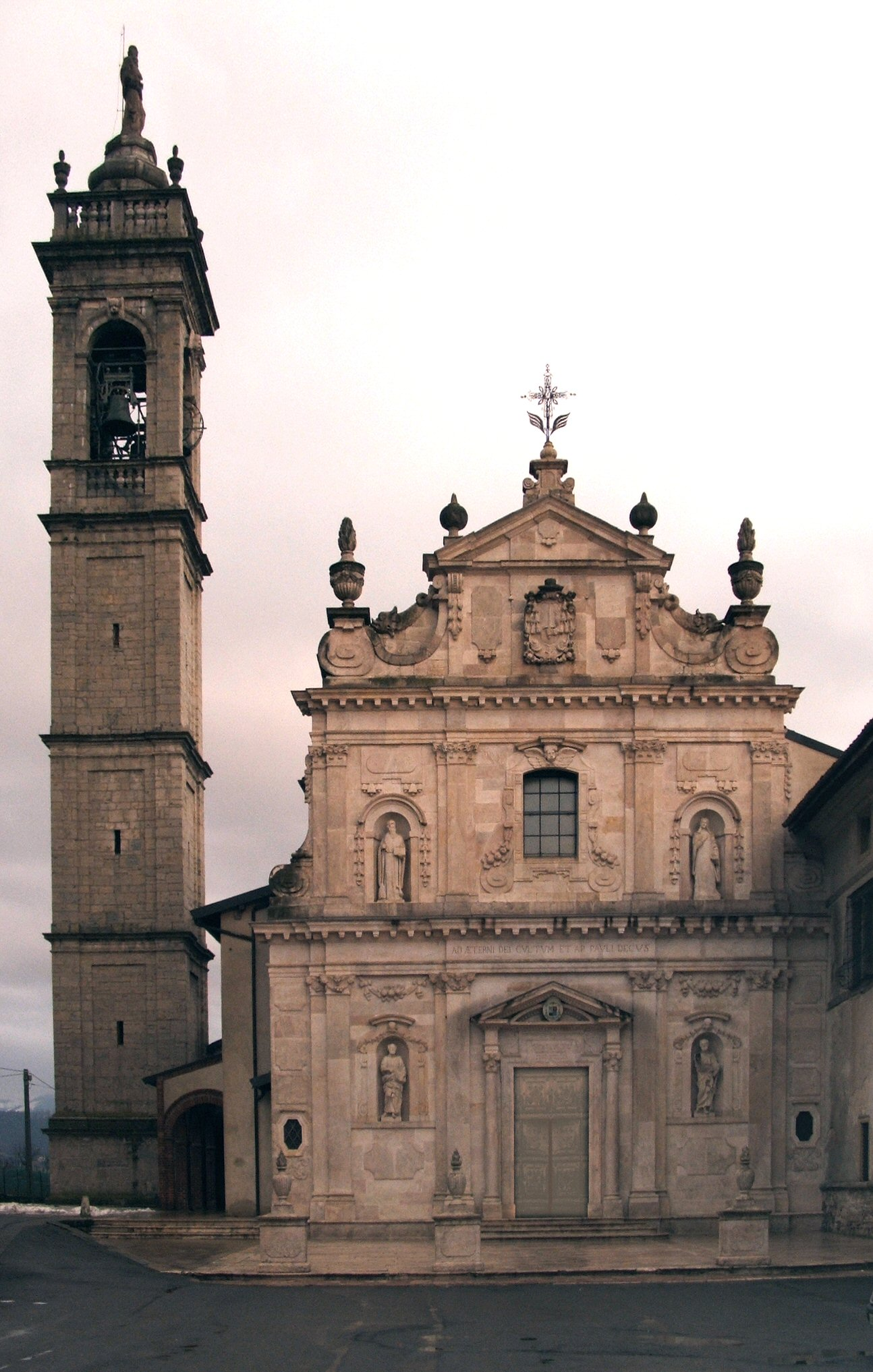
Church and belltower

== History ==
The monastery was initially founded in the 11th century. It was reconstructed in the 16th century to take on the present layout with two cloisters. The design is attributed to Pietro Isabello. The frescoes (1624) in the refectory were painted by Giovanni Battista Lorenzetti.

Starting in 1684, the church was reconstructed by the architect Domenico Messi. He also designed the marble façade was begun in 1688.

The nave ceiling has frescoes depicting the Scenes from the life of Saints Paul and Benedict (1712–1713) by Giulio Quaglio (presumably Giulio Quaglio the Younger). The polychrome marble altars in the church were constructed (1692–1707) by Antonio and Domenico Corbarelli from Brescia. The four evangelists in niches of the facade were sculpted by Santo Callegari il Vecchio. The main altar (1716) was built by the Corbarelli, but has sculptures by the studio of Andrea Fantoni.

In the first chapel on the left is an altarpiece depicting St Andrew with Saints John the Evangelist, Pantaleone, and Lucy (1703) by Antonio Molinari. The flanking walls have canvases depicting the Martyrdom of St John the Evangelist and St Andrew prays to the Cross of Martyrdom, both from 1728, painted by Giuseppe Maria Crespi.

The second chapel on the left has two oval canvases (1727) depicting events that could be linked to the theme of the eucharist: the Gathering of Manna and Melchizedek offers bread and wine to God by Paolo de Matteis.

The third chapel on left, houses a St Gregory the Great prays for liberation from the Plague (1698) by Domenico Carretti, and two canvases depicting St Gregory receives Jesus and St Gregory shows the faithful his bloody corporal, both from 1729, by Antonio Balestra.

The front chapel houses a painting depicting St Benedict giving St Maurus the Benedictine Rules with Saints Placidus and Scholastica (1692) by Gregorio Lazzarini. This is flanked by two canvases depicting St Maurus rescues St Placidus from the water on commands from St Benedict and St Maurus heals the Sick by Sebastiano Ricci.

In the central chapel at right are two oval canvases (1728) depicting the Sacrifice of Isaac and The Bronze Serpent by Paolo de Matteis. In the first chapel on right is an altarpiece depicting St Alexander decapitated with Saints Grata, Fermo, Rustico, and Antony (1704) by Antonio Bellucci. On the lateral walls are two canvases (1729) depicting Saints Fermo and Rustico in Prison and the Martrydom of St Alexander by Giuseppe Maria Crespi.
