= Gaifami Palace =

Palace in Brescia, Italy

Coordinates: 45°32′42″N 10°12′59″E

- Palazzo Gaifami
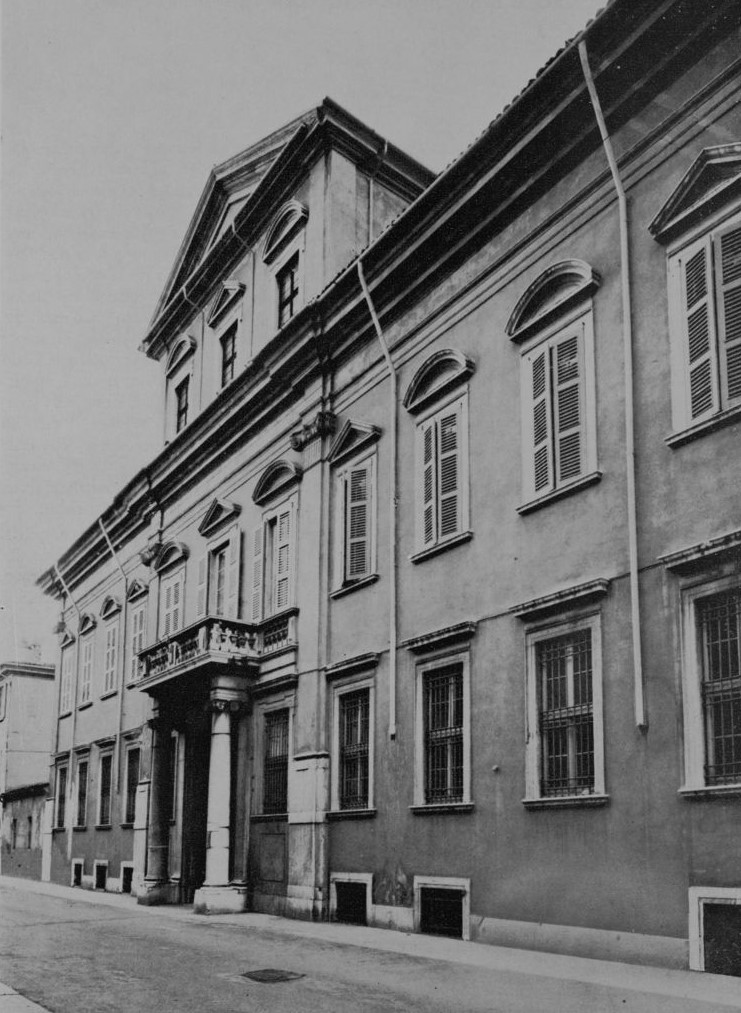
- An overall view of the facade of the building on Fratelli Bandiera Street
- Interactive map of the Gaifami Palace area

General information
- Status: Completed
- Location: Via Fratelli Bandiera, 22, Brescia, Italy
- Year built: 18th century
- Owner: White Cross of Brescia

Design and construction
- Architect: Ascanio Girelli (?)

Gaifami Palace is a historic building in Brescia. Located on Via Fratelli Bandiera at number 22, it was built starting in the 18th century by the Gaifami family at the northwestern end of Brescia's northern historic center, in what was once the quadra di San Faustino.

Some of the halls and rooms of the same palace were the subject, around the fourth decade of the 18th century, of major pictorial interventions by Carlo Innocenzo Carloni and the quadraturists Carlo Molinari and Giovanni Zanardi. This makes that of the Gaifami palace a well-known decorative enterprise, with secular themes executed by Carloni in Italy.

== History ==
=== Ascension of the Gaifami family in the 18th century ===
The noble Gaifami family, during the first half of the eighteenth century, in 1742 requested to join the general council of the Brescian patriciate: that family had good relations with the local ruling class, as well as connections with prestigious figures in general and affluent economic conditions.

Given this context of consolidation of the family power of the Gaifami as an assumption, the request made by the latter is clear. Incidentally, at the time this application was made, evidence had also to be produced to support the family's Brescian ancestry for at least the previous two centuries. This was a very difficult condition to comply with, since the applicants belonged to a branch of the family from Asola, which although it too had Brescian origins from where it was probably driven out during the 14th century, the documents testifying to this had been lost over time. As a result, a name found in two documents concerning the family's genealogy was substituted: (Note: Fausto Lechi reports that two documents were modified here: the name of Antonio was substituted for that of Ottaviano, so as to make it appear that Ottaviano himself, a nobleman from Brescia who lived in the 16th century, had descendants, when in fact he died without heirs. In this way, the fictitious Brescian ancestry of the family was thus demonstrated. For further discussion see in Lechi, pp. 177–178, no. 6.) the change was not discovered and, in doing so, the family was able to join the council of the Brescian patriciate.

=== New aristocratic residence ===
On the occasion of the Gaifami family's admission to the general council, the construction of a new aristocratic palace in the city was commissioned: it was to be built in what is now Fratelli Bandiera Street, once called the contrada dei Fiumi. In fact, thanks to a precario dated April 10, 1742, it can be inferred with certainty that, on that date, work had already begun on their dwelling in that contrada; in this regard, in the aforementioned precario the Gaifami asked the municipal authorities for an adjustment and arrangement of the public road, “for the beginning reconstruction of our house in contrada Fiumi.” (Note: They demanded that the elevation of the facade of the palace be changed so that the columns of the portal would occupy part of the public ground; they were also asked on this occasion to change the arrangement of the walls of the main body and also of the eastern portion. For further details see in Lechi, pp. 177–178, n.° 8)

It is uncertain, in any case, who may have been commissioned to design the architecture of the noble palace: the scholar Fausto Lechi advances a hypothesis and, in this sense, traces the construction of the dwelling to the figure of Ascanio Girelli, based on repetitions of architectural schemes already known and employed in his time by Gaspare Turbini and Giovanni Battista Marchetti (as, for example, in the Lechi palace in Montirone); again in support of this attribution, Lechi also adds that the Girellis at the time of the work on the palace were neighbors of the Gaifami, since they lived precisely near the Palazzo Calini ai Fiumi. Another possible architect figure, reported this time by the scholar Paolo Guerrini, is Vincenzo Gaifami, who also had the opportunity, among other things, to direct the construction sites of the Duomo nuovo in Brescia.

=== End of construction works and the frescoes in the halls ===
Beginning with the sure testimony of the aforementioned precarius, dating undoubtedly to 1742, Fausto Lechi states that two more years were needed to complete the building site of the palace. Thus, it is plausible to say that only from 1744 onward were the interiors decorated and frescoed. Supporting this chronological dating of the decorative cycles of the Gaifami palace, among other things, should be mentioned the autobiography written by Giovanni Zanardi himself, an illusionistic ceiling painter at work in some of the rooms of the noble residence: he, in fact, mentions the rivalry with the other quadraturista then active in the same yard, namely Carlo Molinari; it is also testified, in various passages of the already mentioned autobiography, that the two artists were clearly in conflict to win the decoration of the most prestigious room of the factory, namely the great hall. Due to this situation of rivalry, as well as to the unsuitable pay, Zanardi later decided to abandon the building site of the palace; in addition to this, mention should also be made of Molinari's sudden death in 1747, which allows us to anticipate the execution of the frescoes of the Gaifami palace to before 1750, as evidenced moreover by studies carried out by Fiorella Frisoni.

=== 19th and 20th centuries ===
The aristocratic building, once Vincenzo Gaifami died in 1796, was sold, as the family had died out with the latter's death. For the next century and a half, nonetheless, the palace passed through the hands of various owners, including the Bailo family and the Camonica family of Beccaguti. Since 1941, however, it became the permanent property of the Brescia White Cross, serving as its headquarters.

== Description ==
=== Architecture and floor plan ===
The facade of the palace presents a compositional scheme strongly inspired by other palaces in the city and the Brescia area, such as palazzo Uggeri alla Pace and Palazzo Lechi, which in turn are close to the models of Palazzo Martinengo Palatini and Palazzo Avogadro. In general, however, the architectural solutions of the facade of Palazzo Gaifami are rather sober and restrained compared to the reported examples: the front is divided into three distinct orders by large and imposing stone and stucco pilasters, which rise from the bottom to the top of the facade; two more pilasters are then repeated at the ends of the facade, so as to frame its structure. Finally, all the pilasters are crowned with a composite Corinthian capital with triglyphs and ovoli. The gateway to the structure, on the other hand, consists of two monumental columns resting on high plinths and also culminating in Corinthian capitals. On either side of the portal are also two large windows, connected in turn to those on the upper floor. Finally, the balustrade balcony, which is supported by the same columns as the portal, is connected with the nearby, smaller balconies of the side windows.

The ground-floor windows, on the other hand, are framed by a simple boxing; those on the second floor, on a level with the aforementioned balcony windows, are surmounted by gables either semicircular or triangular, alternating with each other. The further level of the facade, which pushes upward from the central section, rises isolated with its three windows.

Entering through the palace portal, one enters the atrium. It opens toward the courtyard with three bays interspersed with two simple columns. On the inner facade itself, facing the same courtyard and the ramparts of the ancient city walls, there are no architectural elements worth mentioning, except for an iron balcony supported by corbels.

=== Interior environments and pictorial decorations ===
The testimony provided by Giovan Battista Carboni in his work Le pitture e le sculture di Brescia che sono esposti al pubblico con un appendice di alcune private gallerie, dating back to 1760, gives a clear picture about the rooms of the palace and their respective decorations, also providing elucidations about the artists to whom the same works can be attributed. The rooms in which the pictorial cycles in question were executed are seven, attributable both to the two quadraturists Molinari and Zanardi and, obviously, to the work of Carlo Innocenzo Carloni. The most significant rooms are:

==== Grand staircase ====
The first room being analyzed is the grand staircase, which features a vault frescoed by Carloni; the ceiling is framed in a frame made of white and gold, enclosing Le tre Arti Liberali mentre vengono guidate verso la Fama dalla Magnificenza. The work itself is also described by Giovan Battista Carboni in his eighteenth-century guidebook, thus not many years after its completion:

The vault of the staircase is painted by Carlo Carloni. It represents the three liberal Arts received in protection from the Magnificence, and by the same presented to Jupiter, who crowns them, which is placed at the top of the middle point. On one side is Mars, sleeping in the lap of Venus, with varj genj, disarming him; on the other side are some vizj pressed by the Intellect, because they are contrary to the said Arts.

— Giovanni Battista Carboni, Le pitture e le sculture di Brescia che sono esposte al pubblico con un appendice di alcune private gallerie, 1760, p. 148

This same scene is inscribed in an elongated rectangle, to the left of which is a further group of characters already described by Carloni. There is Mars who, asleep, is disarmed and stripped of his armor by Venus and some winged cherubs. Studies devoted to the figure of Carlo Innocenzo Carloni have pointed out, among other things, the similarity between this work and the one on the vault of the staircase of the Brühl castle, near Cologne, both placed in the opposite direction from the main image. The latter, in fact, is depicted to the right in the opposite direction, which sees the presence, next to the personification of Fame, of the three main arts: Painting, Architecture and Sculpture, the latter in the act of sculpting the bust of Vincenzo Gaifami. Next to these figures towers the personification of Magnificence itself, who is flanked by Minerva and rests her hand on a medallion, in which, in turn, is inscribed the design of the building's first floor. Higher than these two figures, then, is represented Jupiter in the act of crowning them, flanked by Mercury. Finally, the staircase and its decorative apparatus were restored during 1990 by Romeo Seccamani, enhancing the colors and pictorial apparatus of the decorative cycle.

==== Great salon ====
The ceiling of the vast hall features the iconographic theme of Merit Going to the Temple of Virtue; the aforementioned Giovanni Battista Carboni, in his eighteenth-century guidebook, describes the hall in the following words:

[...] in the vault painted by the said Carloni is seen Merit exalted, and Vice cast down, with many figures.

— Giovanni Battista Carboni, Le pitture e le sculture di Brescia che sono esposte al pubblico con un appendice di alcune private gallerie, 1760, p. 148

In this specific work, among the exquisite architectural backdrops designed by Carlo Molinari, the figure of a spear-wielding old man, personification of Merit, in the act of being crowned, stands out centrally: he, turning toward a centrally planned temple, is greeted by jubilant angels and Virtue herself, equipped with a staff and a golden crown in her hands. Arranged around these figures are then other winged cherubs, who carry a club and a mirror, symbols of Fortitude and Truth; a female figure, on the other hand, holds in her hands a cup, in turn a symbol of Wisdom. The allegory of Fame, in this ensemble, seems to support the rise of Merit and holds a trumpet, as if to further incite it; close to these figures, however, appears the figure of Minerva apt to shelter herself, behind her shield, from the attack of the Vices, chained and placed lower down. To the left of Merit are depicted two putti holding a flag and a laurel wreath: below, however, appears a helmet resting on top of an open book; to the left of this group of figures, however, appears a winged figure holding a basket filled with flowers. Moving instead to the right of the described scene, one encounters a group of figures aroused by a cherub pulling a cloth toward them; finally, a winged figure invites the array to admire what is happening.

== See also ==
- Palazzo Lechi
- Carlo Innocenzo Carloni
- Giovanni Zanardi
- White Cross

== Bibliography ==
- Carboni, Giambattista (1962). "Notizie istoriche delli pittori, scultori ed architetti bresciani" [Historical news of Brescian painters, sculptors and architects] (PDF). In Boselli, Camilo (ed.). Supplemento ai Commentarii dell'Ateneo di Brescia [Supplement to the Commentaries of the Atheneum of Brescia] (in Italian). Brescia: Tipolitografia fratelli Geroldi. pp. 148–152.
- Carboni, Giovan Battista (1760). Chizzola, Luigi (ed.). Le pitture e le sculture di Brescia che sono esposte al pubblico con un'appendice di alcune private gallerie [Brescia paintings and sculptures that are on public display with an appendix from some private galleries] (in Italian). Brescia: Giambatista Bossini.
- Monti, Eleonora; Zanardi, Giovanni (1965). "Origine e vita di Giovanni Zanardi commorante in Brescia. Vita di Francesco Monti. Notizie istoriche della sig. Eleonora Monti" [Origin and life of Giovanni Zanardi commorant in Brescia. Life of Francesco Monti. Historical news of Ms. Eleonora Monti] (PDF). In Boselli, Camillo (ed.). Supplemento ai Commentari dell'Ateneo per l'anno 1964 [Supplement to the Commentaries of the Athenaeum for the year 1964] (in Italian). Brescia: Tipolito Fratelli Geroldi. pp. 22–27.
- Fappani, Antonio, ed. (1982). "GAIFAMI, de Gayfamis" [GAIFAMI, from Gayfamis]. Enciclopedia bresciana [Encyclopedia of Brescia] (in Italian). Vol. 5. Brescia: La Voce del Popolo. OCLC 163181971.
- Manaresi, Cesare (1941). Notizie sulla famiglia Gaifami [News about the Gaifami family] (in Italian). Milan: E. Bestetti edizioni d'arte.
- Cappelletto, G (1963). "L'architettura dei secoli XVI e XVIII" [The architecture of the 16th and 18th centuries]. In Treccani degli Alfieri, Giovanni (ed.). Storia di Brescia [History of Brescia] (in Italian). Vol. III. Brescia: Morcelliana. pp. 341–397.
- Lechi, Fausto (1979). "Il Settecento e il primo Ottocento nella città" [The eighteenth and early nineteenth centuries in the city]. Le dimore bresciane in cinque secoli di storia [Brescian mansions in five centuries of history] (in Italian). Vol. 6. Brescia: Edizioni di Storia bresciana. pp. 169–178.
- Adami, Giulia (2020). "Croce Bianca Brescia, già palazzo Gaifami" [Brescia White Cross, formerly palazzo Gaifami]. In Cretella, Stefania (ed.). Miti e altre storie: la grande decorazione a Brescia 1680–1830 [Myths and other stories: the great decoration in Brescia 1680–1830] (in Italian). Grafo.
- Quecchia, Andrea (2015). "Carlo Innocenzo Carloni a Brescia: novità per i cicli pittorici dei palazzi Martinengo di Padernello, Gaifami e Valotti Rampinelli Rota" [Carlo Innocenzo Carloni in Brescia: news for the painting cycles of the Martinengo di Padernello, Gaifami and Valotti Rampinelli Rota palaces]. Arte Lombarda. III (175). Milan: Vita e Pensiero: 77–83. ISSN 0004-3443. JSTOR 24815780.
