= Angelo Michele Toni =

Italian painter

Angelo Michele Toni (1640-January 16, 1708) was an Italian painter of the Baroque period. He was born and active in Bologna. He started as a manuscript illuminator. He was the first painting teacher of Antonio Dardani and of Giuseppe Maria Crespi. A painting attributed to him, a copy of Ludovico Carracci's Predica di Sant'Antonio Abate, is preserved in the church of Santa Maria e San Folco di Saletto, near Bologna.
