= Antonio Dardani =

Painter (1677–1735)

Antonio Dardani (1677–1735) was a painter of the Baroque period, mainly in his native Bologna, Papal States.

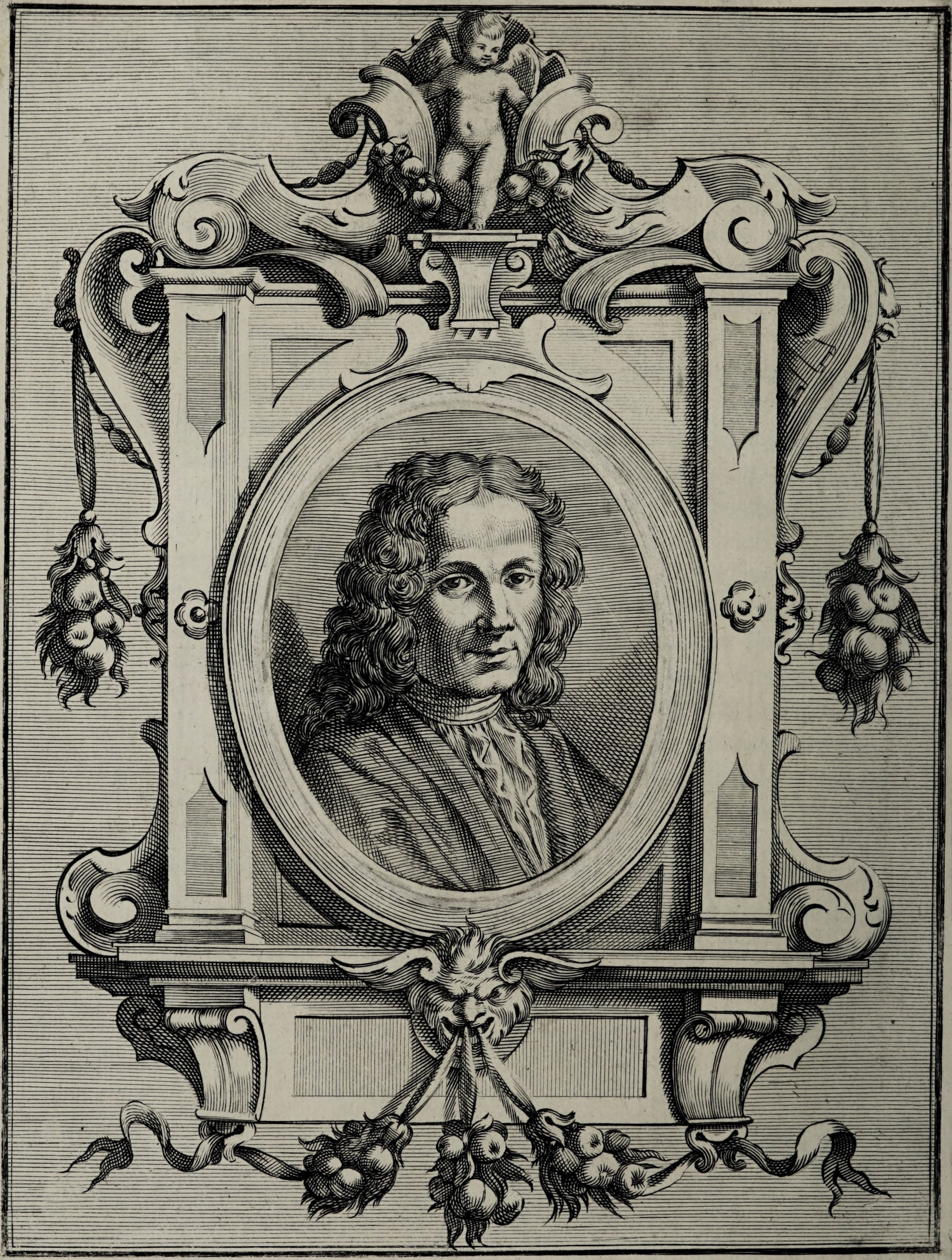
Portrait of Antonio Dardani

== Biography ==
He was born in Bologna. In around 1720, he painted the Theater of Reggio along with Giovanni Zanardi.

He was described as a versatile painter, excellent in all manner of painting. He was born in Bologna in 1677 and then apprenticed with Angelo Michele Toni, from there he went to learn with Giovanni Maria Viani. When the latter died, he worked with Domenico Maria Viani. Dardani went to Parma, and copied a number of paintings of Correggio. Returning to Bologna, he painted a Virgin and Saints altarpiece for an altar in the church of Santa Maria del Pianto, which was placed in the Castle San Pietro, and replaced by an altarpiece dedicated to Saints Barbara and Donino.

For Count Zani he painted some rooms in his country home, then in 1707 went to Macerata with Carlo Rambaldi, for the service of Bonacursi, and afterwards in Rome for pleasure. In this church of St. Catterina of Strada Maggiore, he left a canvas depicting Saint Giovanni Gualberti trampling the devil, and for the church of Saint Benedict, some Angels, holding the insignias of saints. For the Dominican fathers, he depicted St Vincent Ferrer resuscitates a dead child. Dardani painted for church of the Madonna del Carmine in the forte Urbano. He painted many transient decorations for funeral exequies, as well as scenes for operas and theater, both in Bologna and abroad.

He served as the 14th Prince of the Accademia Clementina. He developed a severe headache, later a fever and died two days later on September 29, 1735. His eldest son, only 18 when he died, became a painter.
