= Raimondo Manzini (painter) =

Italian painter

Raimondo Manzini (1668–1744) was an Italian painter, active in Bologna, known for his depictions of flowers and animals. He was called the new Zeuxis. One of his pupils was Leonardo Sconzani.
