= Leonardo Sconzani =

Italian painter

Leonardo Sconzani (1695–1735) was an Italian painter of the late-Baroque period.

He was born and active in Bologna. He studied there as a pupil of Raimondo Manzini (1668–1744). Sconzani is known mainly as a decorative painter and as an illuminator of texts, in which he painted floral and birds as decoration. He painted an allegory depicting the Marriage of Prince Karl of Bavaria and Archduchess Maria Amalia d’Austria (1722).
