= National Museum of the Royal Palace =

Museum of sculpture and painting in Pisa

Coordinates: 43.7164°N 10.3970°E

The National Museum of the Royal Palace (Italian: Museo nazionale di Palazzo Reale) is a museum housed in a former royal palazzo at 46 Lungarno Antonio Pacinotti in Pisa, Italy. The building was designed in 1583 by Bernardo Buontalenti for Francesco I de' Medici and - like the Signoria in Pisa - replaced the Medici palace near the church and monastery of San Matteo. Housing paintings, sculpture, tapestries and decorative arts, since December 2014 the Ministero per i beni e le attività culturali has placed the museum under the control of the Polo museale della Toscana, renamed the Direzione regionale Musei in December 2019.
