= Ingenuity (Crespi) =

Painting by Giuseppe Maria Crespi

- Italian: L'Ingegno
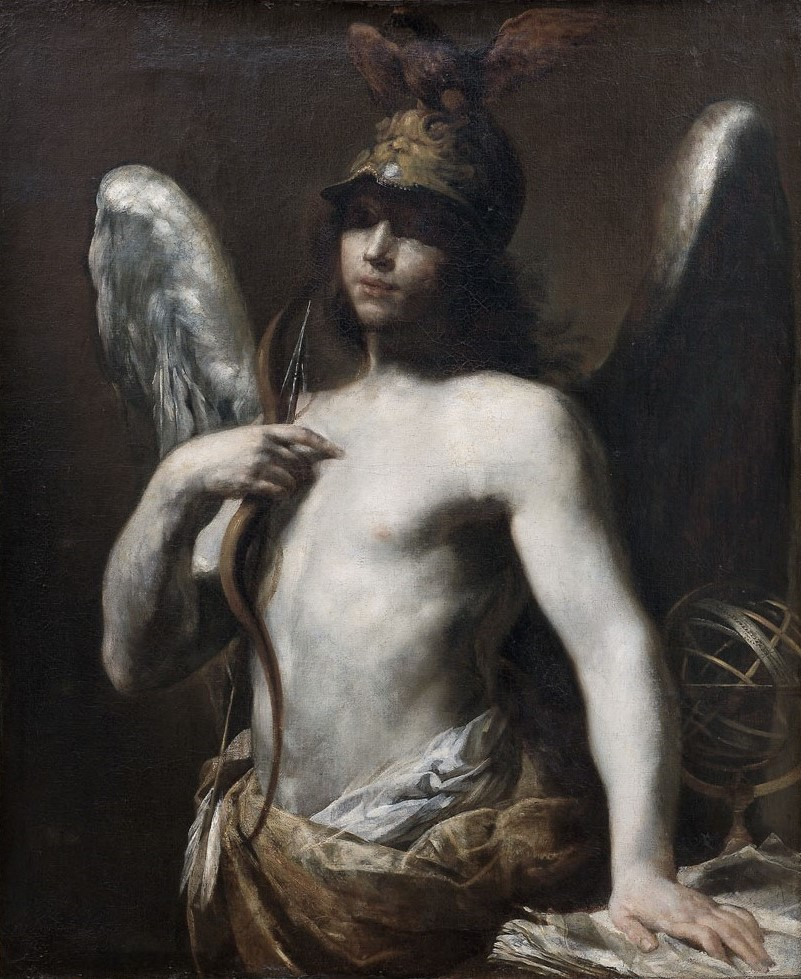
- Artist: Giuseppe Maria Crespi
- Year: 1690s
- Medium: oil painting on canvas
- Movement: Baroque painting
- Subject: Allegory of Ingenuity
- Dimensions: 114 cm × 95 cm (45 in × 37 in); also given [wrongly] as 134 × 95 cm (53 × 37 in)
- Location: Musée des Beaux-Arts, Strasbourg
- Accession: 1994

Ingenuity (Italian: L'Ingegno) is an allegorical Baroque painting by the Bolognese painter Giuseppe Maria Crespi. The painting is also known as Amor Victorious. It is on display in the Musée des Beaux-Arts of Strasbourg, France, to which it had been donated by the collectors Othon Kaufmann and François Schlageter. Its inventory number is 994-1-1, or 44.994.1.1.

The painting, one of the long-lived Crespi's most monumental and expressive, was painted in the early years of his mature period, although a precise dating has proved impossible. Its texture may have been inspired by Rembrandt, its subject by Caravaggio's Triumphant Cupid, although this winged young man with the helmet, the bow and arrow, and the armillary sphere behind him, also stands for the classical allegory of ingenuity (the faculty of finding clever solutions).

The painting once hung in Palazzo Magnani, Bologna, where it was seen and described by Joshua Reynolds, around 1750 ("A young man like figure with a helmet Bows and Arrows in his hand by Spagniolo"). It was bought in Venice in 1986 by Kaufmann and Schlageter and later given to the Musée des Beaux-Arts, together with several other paintings, among which two other Crespis; a fourth Crespi had already been donated to the museum by the two men in 1987.
