= Maria Oriana Galli Bibiena =

Italian painter (1656–1749)

- Born: 1656
- Died: 3 January 1749 (aged 92–93); Bologna
- Burial place: Santa Maria dei Servi, Bologna
- Spouse: Gioacchino Pizzoli
- Father: Giovanni Maria Galli da Bibiena
- Relatives: Ferdinando Galli-Bibiena (brother); Francesco Galli Bibiena (brother)
- Family: Galli da Bibiena family

Maria Oriana Galli Bibiena (1656 – 3 January 1749) was an Italian painter and member of the Galli da Bibbiena family of artists of Tuscan origin. She specialized in mannerist portrait and history paintings.

== Biography ==
Bibiena was born in 1656 into the Galli da Bibbiena family of artists of Tuscan origin. Her father was Giovanni Maria Galli da Bibiena (1625–1665) and her brothers were Ferdinando Galli-Bibiena (1657–1743) and Francesco Galli Bibiena (1659–1739). The first biographical information on Bibiena dates to Antonio Masini's biographies.

Bibiena studied under her father, Marcantonio Franceschini and Carlo Cignani; she may also have been an apprentice of Elisabetta Sirani. She specialized in mannerist portraits and history paintings. Among Bibiena's commissions was the altarpiece painting of "The Trinity in Glory with Saints" for the Church of the Madonna del Sasso in Fossombrone, painted c.1680.

Bibiena married the painter Gioacchino Pizzoli (1661–1773). Their son Domenico Pizzoli (1687–1720) also became a painter, and a daughter joined a monastery in Reggio-Emilia. After the death of her husband, Bibiena went to live with her brother Ferdinando, who was by then a widower.

Bibiena died in 1749 in Bologna, aged 93. She was buried at the Santa Maria dei Servi, Bologna.
