= Galli da Bibiena family =

Family of Italian painters and artists

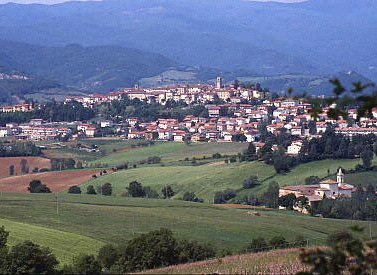
Bibbiena, Italy - origin of the Galli–Bibiena family

The Galli–Bibiena family, or Galli da Bibiena (also spelt "Bibbiena"), was a family of Italian artists of the 17th and 18th centuries, including:

- father, Giovanni Maria Galli da Bibiena (1625–1665)
- daughter Maria Oriana Galli Bibiena (1656–1749), Italian painter
- son Ferdinando Galli Bibiena (1656–1743), Italian architect/designer
- son Francesco Galli Bibiena (1659–1739), Italian architect
- grandson, Alessandro Galli Bibiena (1686–1748), architect/painter
- grandson, Giuseppe Galli Bibiena (1696–1757), Italian designer
- grandson, Antonio Galli Bibiena (1697–1774), Italian architect
- grandson, Giovanni Carlo Galli-Bibiena (1717–1760), architect/designer
- great-grandson, Carlo Galli Bibiena (1728–1787), designer, son of Giuseppe Galli Bibiena

The Galli–Bibiena family derives its name from the surname and birthplace of papa Giovanni Maria Galli (1625 - 21 June 1665), who was born at Bibbiena (Italy) outside Florence. Giovanni was a student of painting and assistant under Francesco Albani, being, evidently, adept at the depiction of water scenes. He produced faithful copies of his master’s paintings. His surviving independent works include an Ascension (1651; Bologna, Certosa) and in the church of Buon Gesù, Bologna, a frescoed St Bernardino and two sibyls. Giovanni Maria Galli–Bibiena died on 21 June 1665 in Bologna, but he had laid the foundations of an artistry which was continued by his descendants, who dedicated themselves to architectural work and set design for the theatre.

Using the highly-ornate style of late baroque sculpture and architecture, the members of the Galli–Bibiena family produced a series of theatrical and other designs that are noted for their intricate splendor and spacious proportions achieved by detailed perspective.

From about 1690 to 1787, eight Bibienas designed and painted for many of the courts of Europe with intricate settings for operas, weddings, and funerals. The Habsburgs were their most generous patrons.

The works of the Galli–Bibiena family in theatrical scenery were not executed in durable material. Also, because their decorative works for court functions were necessarily temporary, few of their creations have survived; however, the richness and splendour of their works can be judged from drawings made at the time, which have been preserved in great numbers and are found mainly in collections at Vienna, Munich, Dresden and Montreal.

== Sons and daughter ==
Maria Oriana Galli–Bibiena (1656–1749), Italian portrait painter, born at Bologna, was daughter of Giovanni Maria Galli. Maria studied with Carlo Cignani and Marcantonio Franceschini, and she specialized in portraits and history pictures. She married the younger landscape painter Gioacchino Pizzoli (1661–1773), and later, their son Domenico Pizzoli (1687–1720) also became a painter. Maria, at age 93, had outlived her famous brothers and died in Bologna in 1749.

Ferdinando Galli Bibiena (18 August 1656 – 3 January 1743), born at Bologna, was the first son of Giovanni Maria Galli. He studied painting from Carlo Cignani and architecture from Giulio Troili. He worked for the duke of Parma 30 years, on the villa and garden of Colorno, but also worked for the theatre. In 1708, at Barcelona, he arranged decorations for the wedding festivities of the prince, future Charles VI, Holy Roman Emperor; Ferdinando went to Vienna and worked on designs of scenery and decorations for court festivities and the opera. Returning to Bologna in 1717, he was elected a member of the Clementine Academy. Beginning in 1731, he built the Mantua royal theatre (which burned in 1781). He wrote several books, including: L'Architettura civile (1711; "Civil Architecture" and various titles) and Varie opere di prospettiva (1703–1708; "Various Works of Perspective").

Francesco Galli Bibiena (12 December 1659 – 20 January 1739), Italian architect and designer, was born at Bologna as the second son of Giovanni Maria Galli. He studied under both Lorenzo Pasinelli and Carlo Cignani. After working at Piacenza, Parma, and Rome, he then became the ducal architect at Mantua. After living in Genoa and Naples, Francesco Galli Bibiena was called by Emperor Leopold I to the Vienna Hofburg, where in 1700, he built a large theatre, the Große Komödiensaal ("Grand Hall of Comedies"), which became the Court Theater (Burgtheater). After a short stay in Italy and in Lorraine, he was invited by Emperor Joseph I, back to the Hofburg, to work as the "First Theatrical Engineer" and as a scene-painter/decorator from 1709-1712. Francesco was architect of the great theatre in Nancy, France; of the Teatro Filarmonico at Verona (Verona Philharmonic Theatre, which some have called the finest theatre in Italy); and of the Teatro Alibert in Rome. In 1726, Francesco returned to Bologna, where he directed the Clementine Academy.

== Grandsons ==
Alessandro Galli Bibiena (15 October 1686 Parma – 5 May 1748 Mannheim), Italian architect and painter, was the eldest son of Ferdinando and was born at Parma. In 1719, Alessandro became architect and painter at the court for the elector of the Electorate of the Palatinate (in Germany). Among the major works of Alessandro, were the right wing of the castle and the opera house (which both burned in 1795) and also the Jesuit church at Mannheim. Some German documents use the name "Alessandro Galli di Bibiena".

Giuseppe Galli Bibiena (5 January 1696 Parma – 12 March 1757 Berlin), the second son of Ferdinando, born on 5 January 1696 at Parma, became the most distinguished artist of the Galli–Bibiena family. From 1723 to 1747, he worked as "His Majesty's First Theatrical Engineer" for Charles VI, Holy Roman Emperor, where he decorated all of the Habsburg celebratory festivities. Together with his younger brother Antonio, he designed theater decorations and for festivities in Vienna, also Linz, Graz, and Prague (1723 "Costanza e Fortezza" at Hradčany castle). In 1753, he moved to Berlin in the court of Frederick the Great of Prussia, where he died three years later.

Antonio Galli Bibiena (1 January 1700 Parma – 28 January 1774 Milan), Italian architect, born in Parma, third son of Ferdinando, had been a pupil of Giovanni Gioseffo dal Sole and later of Marcantonio Franceschini. Antonio became the architect of the Teatro Scientifico of the National Virgilian Academy at Mantua (Italy), and architect of the Teatro Comunale di Bologna. He was also employed at the Hofburg court of Vienna. Antonio died in Mantua in 1774, at age 74.

Giovanni Carlo Galli-Bibiena (11 August 1717 Bologna – 20 November 1760 Ajuda, Lisbon), architect/designer, the son of Francesco, designed the staircase of Palazzo Savini and a chapel, the Cappella di San Antonio in San Bartolommeo di Porta Ravegnana in Bologna, and the decorative scheme for the high altar of the San Petronio Basilica, Bologna, for the Bolognese Pope Benedict XIV. From 1752-55, he designed and built the Ópera do Tejo in Lisbon, but the opera house was destroyed seven months after completion by the 1755 earthquake. He died five years later.

== Greatgrandsons ==
Carlo Galli Bibiena (1728–1787), son of Giuseppe Galli Bibiena, was born in Vienna. This last member of the theatrical Bibienas travelled farther from home than the rest of the family. Carlo Galli Bibiena worked in 8 countries, including: Germany, France, Austria, the Netherlands (1746–1760), London (1763), Naples (1772, where Carlo published five opera sets); Stockholm (1774); and St. Petersburg, Russia (until 1778). He died in Florence in 1787, near age 59.

== See also ==
- Johann Lukas von Hildebrandt - architect in Hofburg, with Ferdinando Galli-Bibiena.

== Sources ==
- A. H. Mayor, The Bibiena Family, 1940.
- Dunbar H. Ogden, The Italian Baroque Stage, Berkeley, 1978. ISBN 0-520-03006-0.
