= Giovanni Carlo Galli-Bibiena =

Italian architect (1717–1760)

Giovanni Carlo Galli-Bibiena (11 August 1717 - 20 November 1760), was an Italian architect and designer.

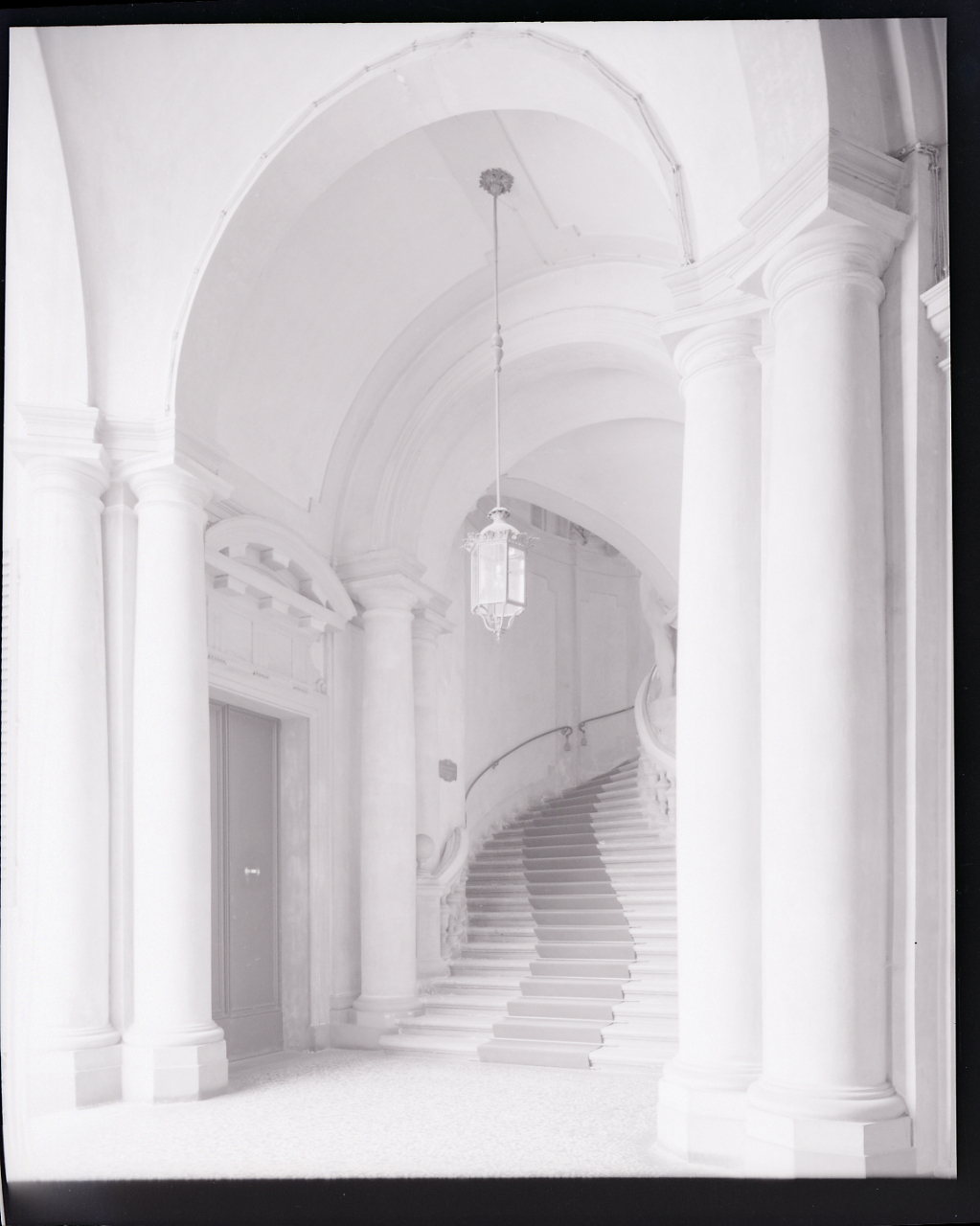
Palazzo Malvasia, later Garagnani, Bologna (1750). Photo by Paolo Monti.

He was the son of Francesco Galli Bibiena and a member of the Galli da Bibiena family of artists. He was a member of the Accademia Clementina in Bologna.

In Bologna, he decorated the staircase of Palazzo Savini and the chapel Cappella di San Antonio in San Bartolommeo di Porta Ravegnana. Giovanni Carlo also designed a decorative scheme for the high altar of San Petronio, Bologna, for the Bolognese Pope Benedict XIV. In 1752, he was summoned by Joseph I of Portugal, to Lisbon, where he designed the Ópera do Tejo adjoining the royal palace, but the opera house was destroyed seven months after completion by the 1755 earthquake. Giovanni Carlo Galli-Bibiena died in Lisbon.
