= Francesco Galli Bibiena =

Italian painter (1659–1739)

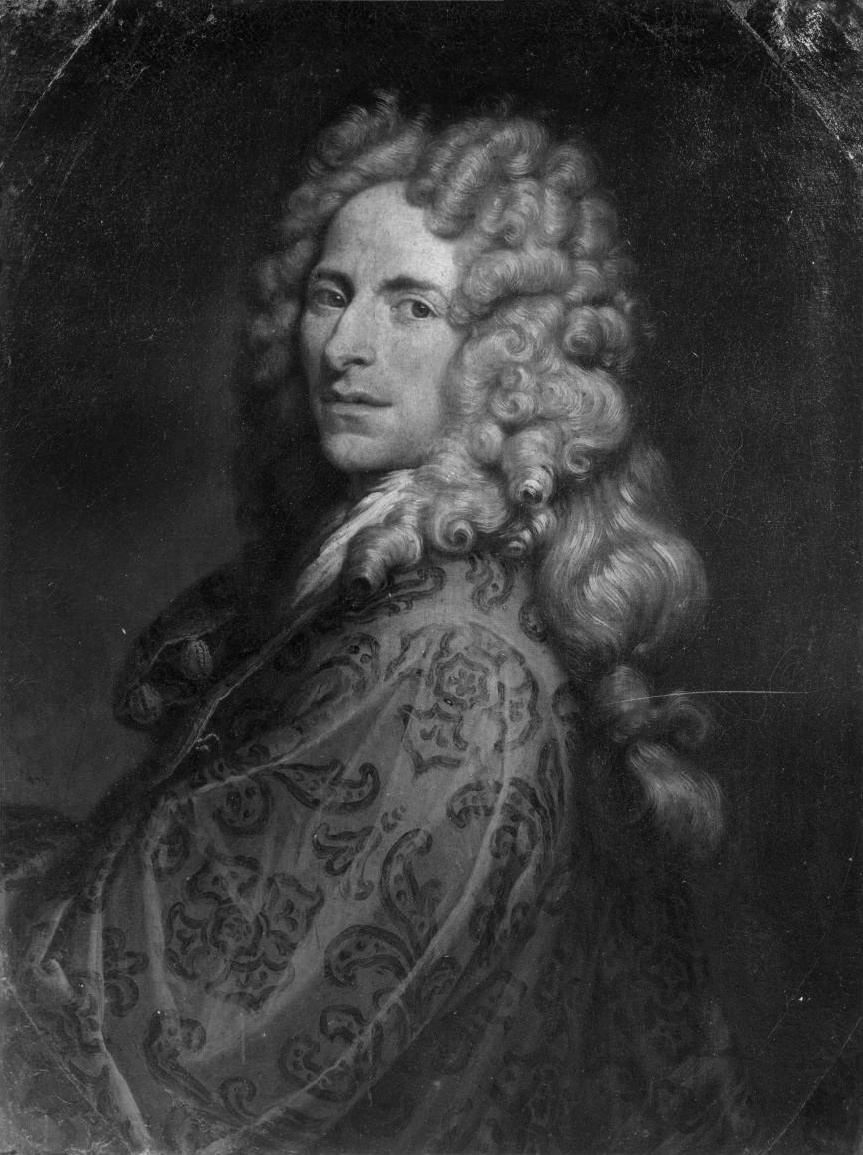
Self portrait, now in the Uffizi in Florence

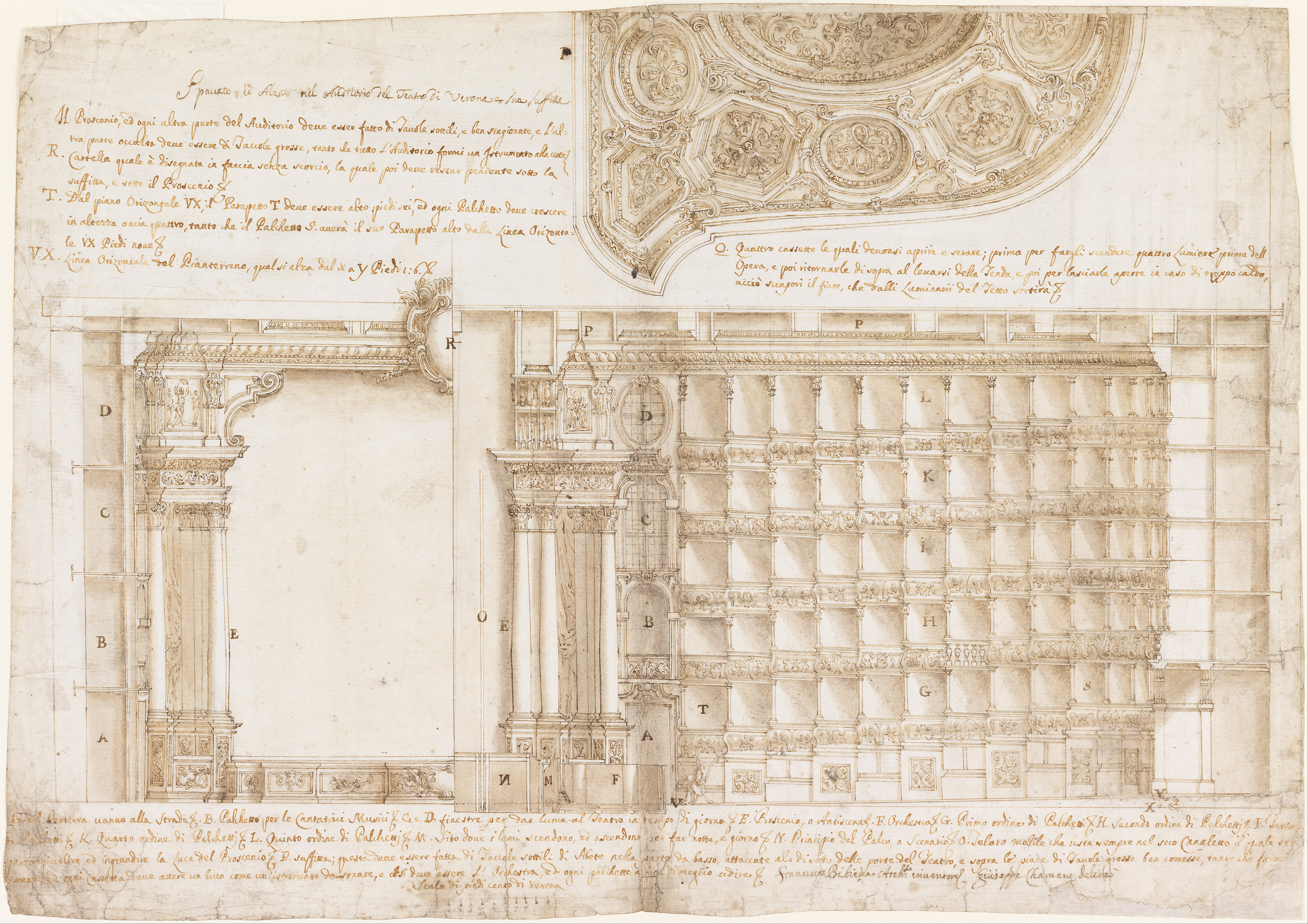
Section and ceiling of the original Teatro Filarmonico in Verona, ca. 1715–1720; drawing now in the Cooper–Hewitt, National Design Museum

Francesco Galli, called Francesco da Bibiena, or da Bibbiena (1659-1739) was a member of the theatrical Galli da Bibiena family and younger brother of Maria Oriana Galli Bibiena and Ferdinando Galli.

== Life and work ==
He was born at Bologna, Papal States. He first studied under Lorenzo Pasinelli; but he was afterwards instructed in the school of Carlo Cignani. His knowledge of architecture and perspective was considerable; but he excelled in figures. Francesco worked at Piacenza, Parma, and Rome, and then became ducal architect at Mantua. After a stay in Genoa and Naples he was called to Vienna, where he built a large theatre. He worked successively for the Emperors Leopold I and Joseph I, and was invited to Madrid by Philip V, who appointed him his principal architect.

Francesco was known for his theatrical achievements in scenic design. He was the first member of the Bibiena family to build theatres as well as to design sets. In 1700 he completely renovated the theatre in Hofburg, Vienna, for Emperor Leopold I. The large theatre was known as the Große Komödiensaal ("Grand Hall of Comedies"), which later became the Court Theater (Burgtheater). The opera house, however, burned down in 1747. The Hoftheater's architecture greatly influenced theatre design in Germany and Austria throughout the first half of the eighteenth century.

After a short stay in Italy and in Lorraine, he was invited by Emperor Joseph I, back to the Hofburg, to work as the "First Theatrical Engineer" and as a scene-painter/decorator from 1709 to 1712. He was also the architect of the great theatre at Nancy, France; of the Teatro Filarmonico at Verona, which some called the finest theatre in Italy; and of the Teatro Alibert in Rome. In 1726, Francesco returned to Bologna, where he directed the Clementine Academy.

Although his father, Giovanni Galli da Bibiena, had a distinguished career, it was Francesco and his older brother Ferdinando that established the family's artistic reputation and its fortune.
