= Barry Kay =

Australian artist

- Vienna, 1977, during his engagement as stage and costume designer of Rudolf Nureyev's ballet production "Don Quixote" for the Wiener Staatsopernballett at the Vienna State Opera House.
- Born: 1932; Melbourne
- Died: 1985 (aged 52–53); London
- Known for: Scenery and costume design, photography

Barry Kay (1932 – 1985) was an Australian stage and costume designer of international renown. After having studied painting at the Académie Julian in Paris and theatre design in Melbourne, he settled in London in 1956. In the course of his career, lasting almost four decades, he designed for the ballet, opera and theatre alike, working with established directors and choreographers at major theatres and opera houses and their companies worldwide.

Kay's emphasis lay in pioneering three-dimensional stage set designs for the ballet. By breaking away from the traditional use of "flat wings" scenery, in designing for the theatre he expanded on the revolutionary ideas of the Russian Constructivists and the Italian Futurists in the early part of the 20th century.

Among others, he designed for the choreographers Walter Gore, Peter Darrell, Kenneth MacMillan and Rudolf Nureyev, as well as for ballet companies such as Western Theatre Ballet (now Scottish Ballet), The Royal Ballet, The Australian Ballet, the Ballet of the Deutsche Oper Berlin, the Stuttgart Ballet, the Vienna State Opera Ballet, Le Ballet de l'Opéra de Paris and American Ballet Theatre.

Some of the drama and opera directors for whom he worked included Margaret Webster, Colin Graham, John Copley, Peter Dews and Rudolf Hartmann - with productions staged by the Royal Shakespeare Company at the Old Vic, London; Sadler's Wells Opera Company (since 1974 English National Opera), Sadler's Wells Theatre, London; The Royal Opera at the Royal Opera House, Covent Garden, London; and numerous other national and international houses.

Later in his career Kay also became a photographer of subjects with socio-anthropological contents. His photo essay As a Woman, published in 1976, is an extensive portrait of the unique transvestite and transsexual community of Sydney, Australia.

Kay's artistic contributions to the performing arts are well represented and documented at national museums, state galleries, art libraries, theatre collections and archives globally. Public collections include: the Australian Performing Arts Collection, Arts Centre Melbourne; Victoria & Albert Museum Theatre Collections, London; Royal Opera House Collections, London; National Gallery of Australia, Canberra; National Library of Australia, Canberra; State Library of New South Wales, Mitchell Library, Sydney; Lipperheidesche Kostümbibliothek, Staatliche Museen zu Berlin; Österreichisches Theatermuseum, Vienna; University of Calgary, Library, Special Collections, Alberta, Canada; MacNay Museum, Tobin Collection of Theatre Arts, San Antonio, Texas.

In November 2006, the Barry Kay Archive website was archived by the National Library of Australia in its PANDORA web archive.

== Honours ==
Live Performance Australia, the premiere body for Australia's live entertainment and performing arts, posthumously selected Kay as one of eighty theatre artists awarded a place in its newly established virtual Hall of Fame. Launched on 30 November 2007, Live Performance pays tribute to a collection of people on the occasion of its 90th anniversary.
