= Karlskirche =

Church in Vienna, Austria

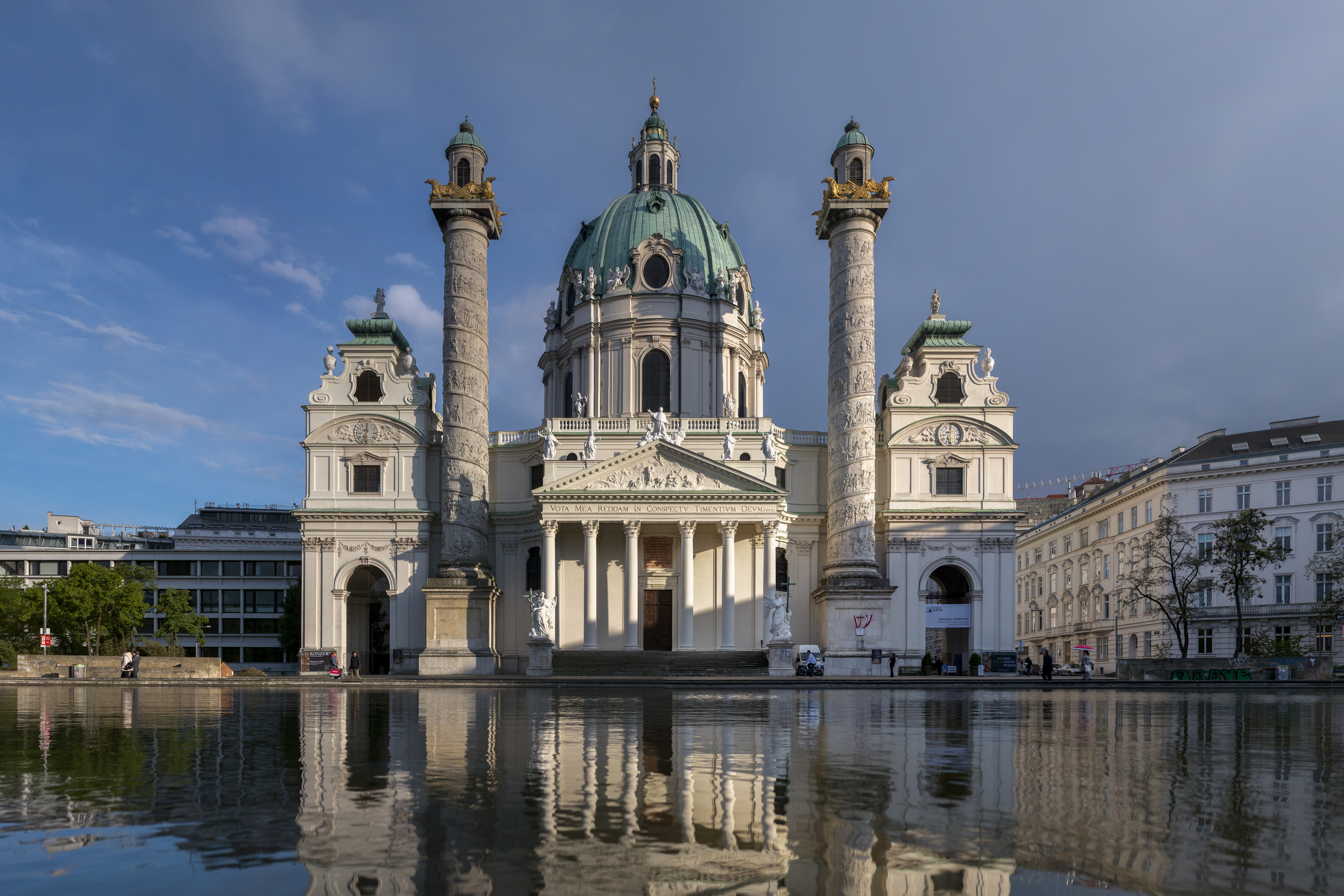

- Location within Vienna Location within Austria

Religion
- Affiliation: Roman Catholic
- Rite: Roman Rite
- Leadership: P. DDr. Marek Pucalik O.Cr.
- Year consecrated: 1737
- Status: Active

Location
- Location: Vienna, Austria
- Coordinates: 48°11′53.81″N 16°22′18.84″E

Architecture
- Architects: Johann Bernhard Fischer von Erlach, Joseph Emanuel Fischer von Erlach
- Type: Church
- Style: Baroque, Rococo
- Founder: Charles VI, Holy Roman Emperor
- Groundbreaking: 1716
- Completed: 1737

Specifications
- Direction of façade: NNW
- Length: 55 m (180 ft)
- Width: 40 m (130 ft)
- Dome: 1
- Dome height (outer): 70 m (229.7 ft)

Website
- www.karlskirche.at

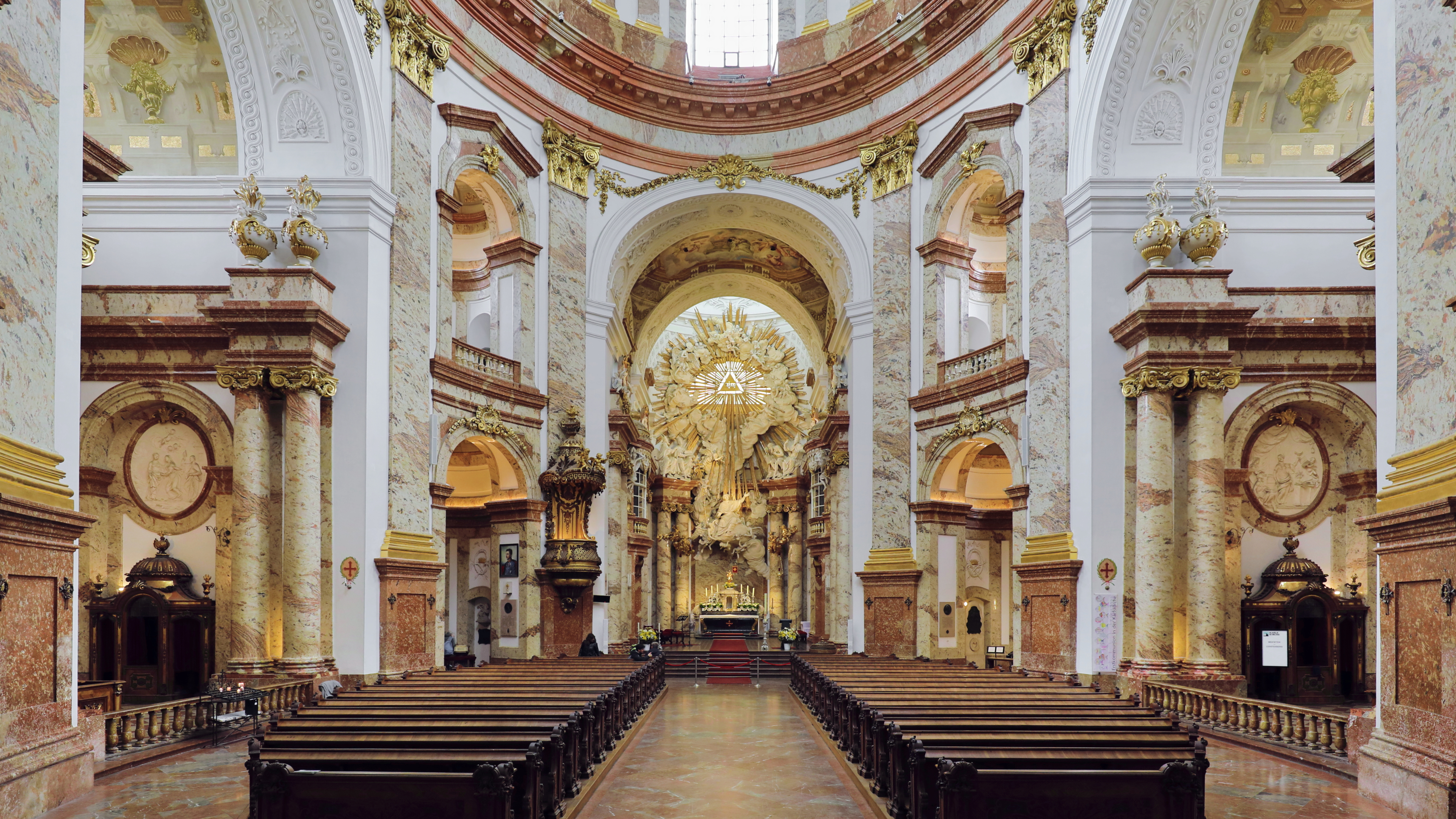
Interior of the church

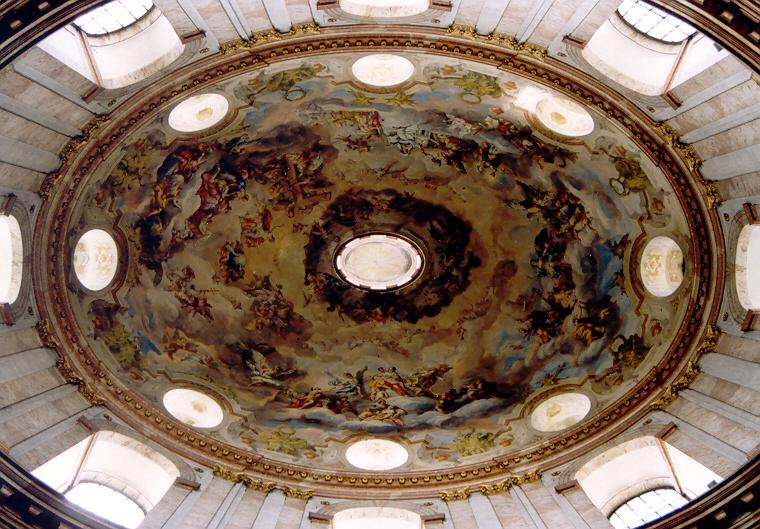
Interior of the frescoed dome

The Karlskirche (English: Charles Church) is a Baroque church in the Karlsplatz in Vienna, Austria. The church is dedicated to Saint Charles Borromeo, a leading figure of the Counter-Reformation. The church is located on the border of Wieden and the Innere Stadt, the city centre.

== History ==
In 1713, one year after the last major plague epidemic in Vienna, Charles VI, Holy Roman Emperor, pledged to build a church dedicated to his namesake patron saint, Charles Borromeo, who was revered as a healer for plague sufferers. An architectural competition was announced, in which Johann Bernhard Fischer von Erlach won over competitors including Ferdinando Galli-Bibiena and Johann Lukas von Hildebrandt. Construction began in 1716 under the supervision of Anton Erhard Martinelli. After J.B. Fischer's death in 1723, his son, Joseph Emanuel Fischer von Erlach, completed the construction in 1737 with modifications to the original plans. The church originally possessed a direct line of sight to the Hofburg and was also, until 1918, the imperial patron parish church.

As a master of historic architecture, the elder Fischer von Erlach united the most diverse of elements. The façade in the centre, which leads to the porch, corresponds to a Greek temple portico. The two flanking columns, crafted by Lorenzo Mattielli, were inspired by Trajan's Column in Rome. Next to those, two tower pavilions extend out and show the influence of the Roman baroque (Bernini and Borromini). Above the entrance, a dome rises up above a high drum, which the younger J.E. Fischer shortened and partly altered.

Adjacent to the church was the Spitaler Gottesacker cemetery. Composer Antonio Vivaldi was buried there on July 28, 1741, but his grave has been lost over time. The church hosts regular Vivaldi concerts in his honour.

Inventor and actress Hedy Lamarr, then aged 19, married Austrofascist Friedrich Mandl, aged 32, in the chapel of the church on 10 August 1933. With over 200 prominent guests in attendance, Lamarr wore "a black-and-white print dress" and carried "a bouquet of white orchids."

Since the restoration of Karlsplatz as an architectural ensemble in the late 1980s, the church has garnered fame because of its dome and its two flanking columns of bas-reliefs, as well as its role as an architectural counterweight to the buildings of the Musikverein and of the Vienna University of Technology. The church is cared for by the Knights of the Cross with the Red Star, and has long been the parish church and seat of the Catholic student ministry of the Vienna University of Technology.

== Iconography ==
The iconographical program of the church originated from the imperial official Carl Gustav Heraeus and connects Saint Charles Borromeo with his imperial benefactor. The relief on the pediment above the entrance with the cardinal virtues and the figure of the patron on its apex point to the motivation of the donation. This sculpture group continues onto the attic story as well. The attic is also one of the elements which the younger Fischer introduced. The columns display scenes from the life of Charles Borromeo in a spiral relief and are intended to recall the two columns, Boaz and Jachim, that stood in front of the Temple at Jerusalem. They also recall the Pillars of Hercules and act as symbols of imperial power. The entrance is flanked by angels from the Old and New Testaments.

This program continues in the interior as well, above all in the dome fresco by Johann Michael Rottmayr of Salzburg and Gaetano Fanti, which displays an intercession of Charles Borromeo, supported by the Virgin Mary. Surrounding this scene are the cardinal virtues. The frescos in a number of side chapels are attributed to Daniel Gran.

The high altarpiece portraying the ascension of the saint was conceptualized by the elder Fischer and executed by Ferdinand Maxmilian Brokoff. The altar paintings in the side chapels are by various artists, including Daniel Gran, Sebastiano Ricci, Martino Altomonte and Jakob van Schuppen. A wooden statue of St. Anthony by Josef Josephu is also on display.

As strong effect emanates from the directing of light and architectural grouping, in particular the arch openings of the main axis. The color scheme is characterized by marble with sparring and conscious use of gold leaf. The large round glass window high above the main altar with the Hebrew Tetragrammaton/Yahweh symbolizes God's omnipotence and simultaneously, through its warm yellow tone, God's love. Below is a representation of Apotheosis of Saint Charles Borromeo.

Next to the structures at Schönbrunn Palace, which maintain this form but are more fragmented, the church is considered Fischer's greatest work. It is also an expression of the Austrian joie de vivre stemming from the victorious end of the Turkish Wars.

== Pulpit ==
The pulpit of the church was probably designed by Fischer von Erlach the Younger, and its execution may have been carried out by the French furniture maker Claude Le Fort du Plessy in 1735, although no surviving documents confirm their authorship or the construction of the church furniture. It is a wooden structure with rich floral, vegetal, rosette and rocaille ornaments, the finer carvings made of hard walnut, in a gold and brown colour scheme. The abat-voix forms a theatrical canopy, featuring two putti holding a cross and a chalice with a host, with a flaming urn at the top. Around 1860, the abat-voix was enlarged. A wide rim was added, distorting the original proportions, obscuring the elegant swirling lines, and creating a top-heavy effect. Between 2006 and 2007, this rim was removed after extensive debate, and the pulpit was restored. The missing canopy carvings were reconstructed, restoring the structure's original appearance.

== Gallery ==
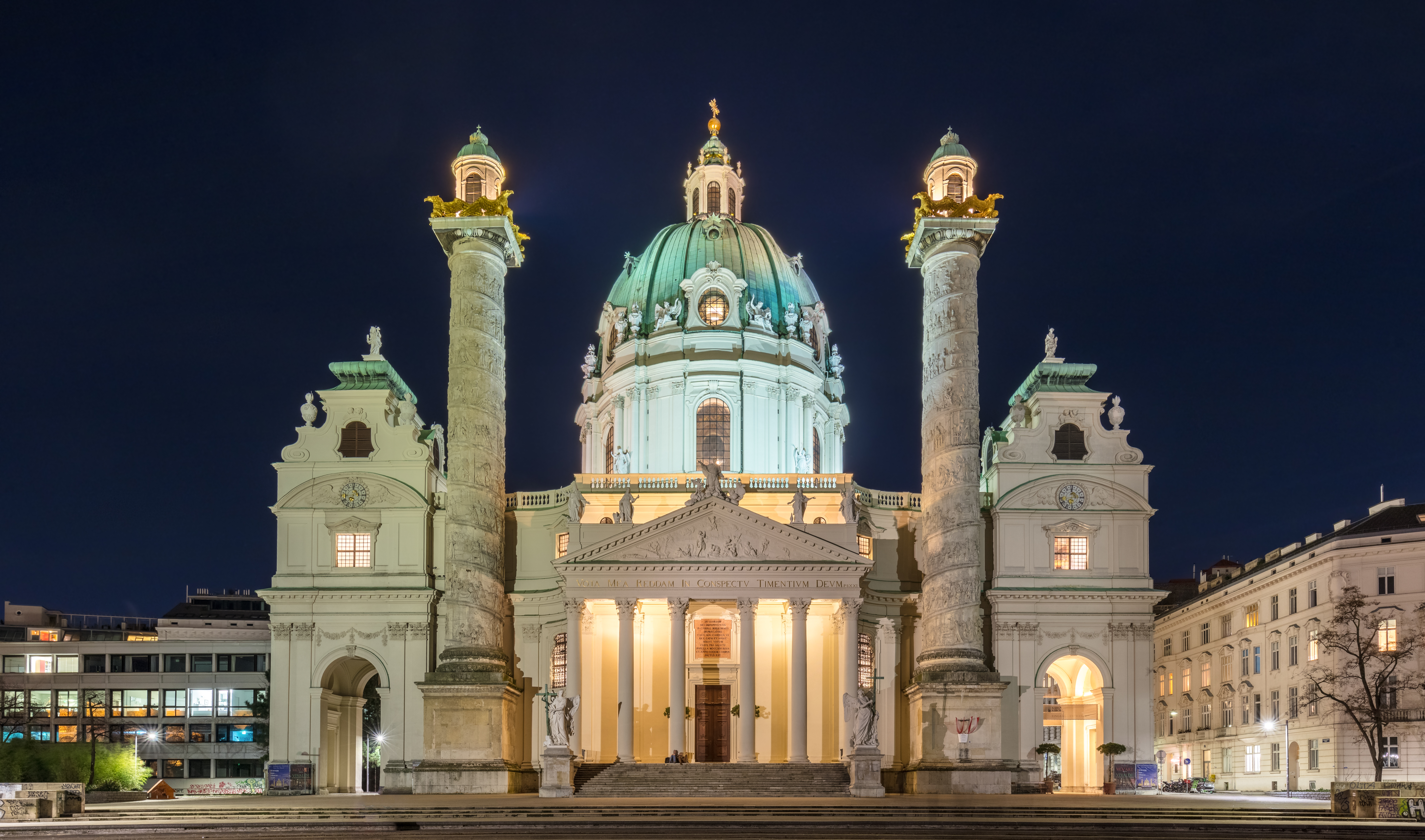
Night view of the church

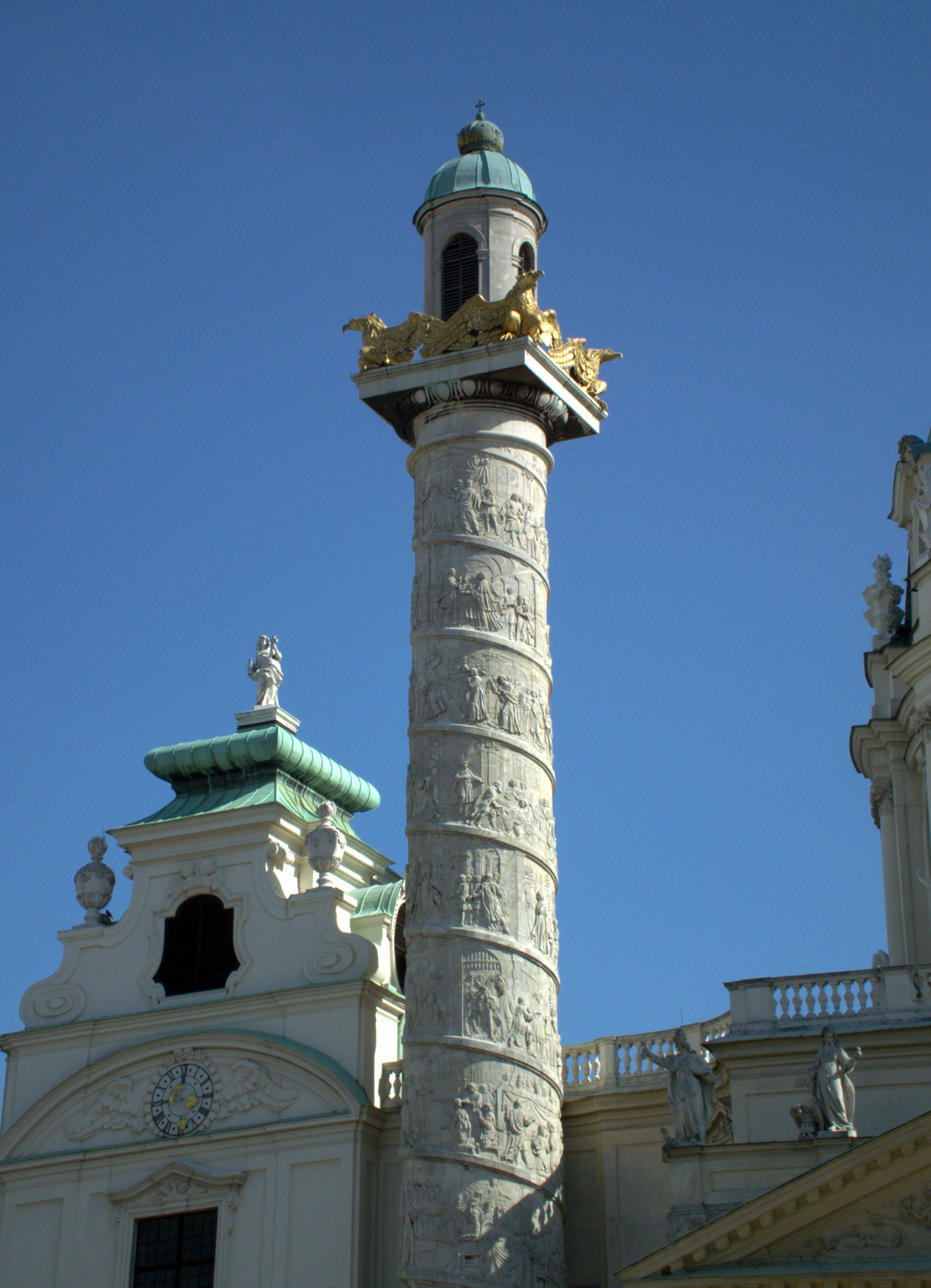
Column with spiral narrative as on Trajan's Column

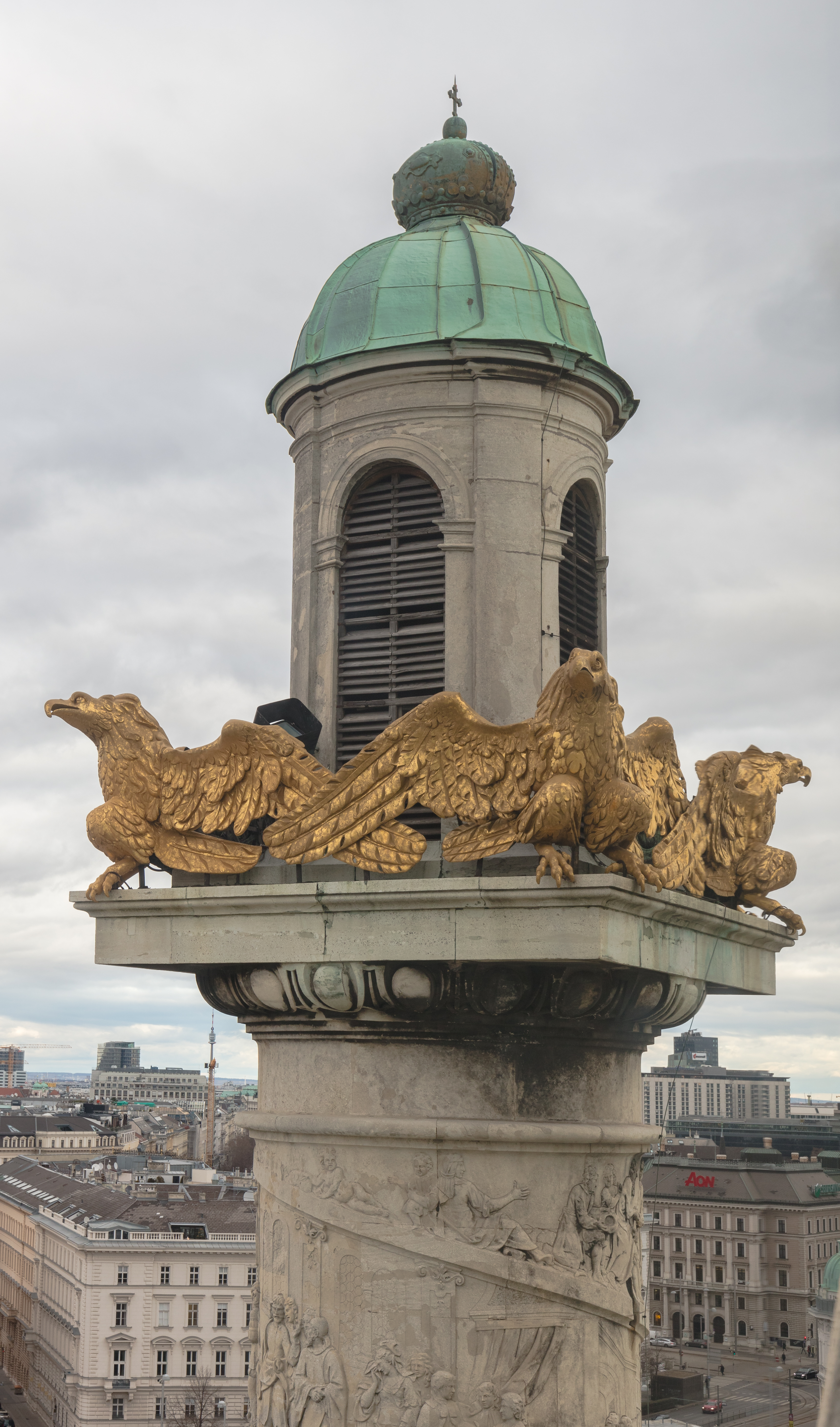
Top of one of the two towers

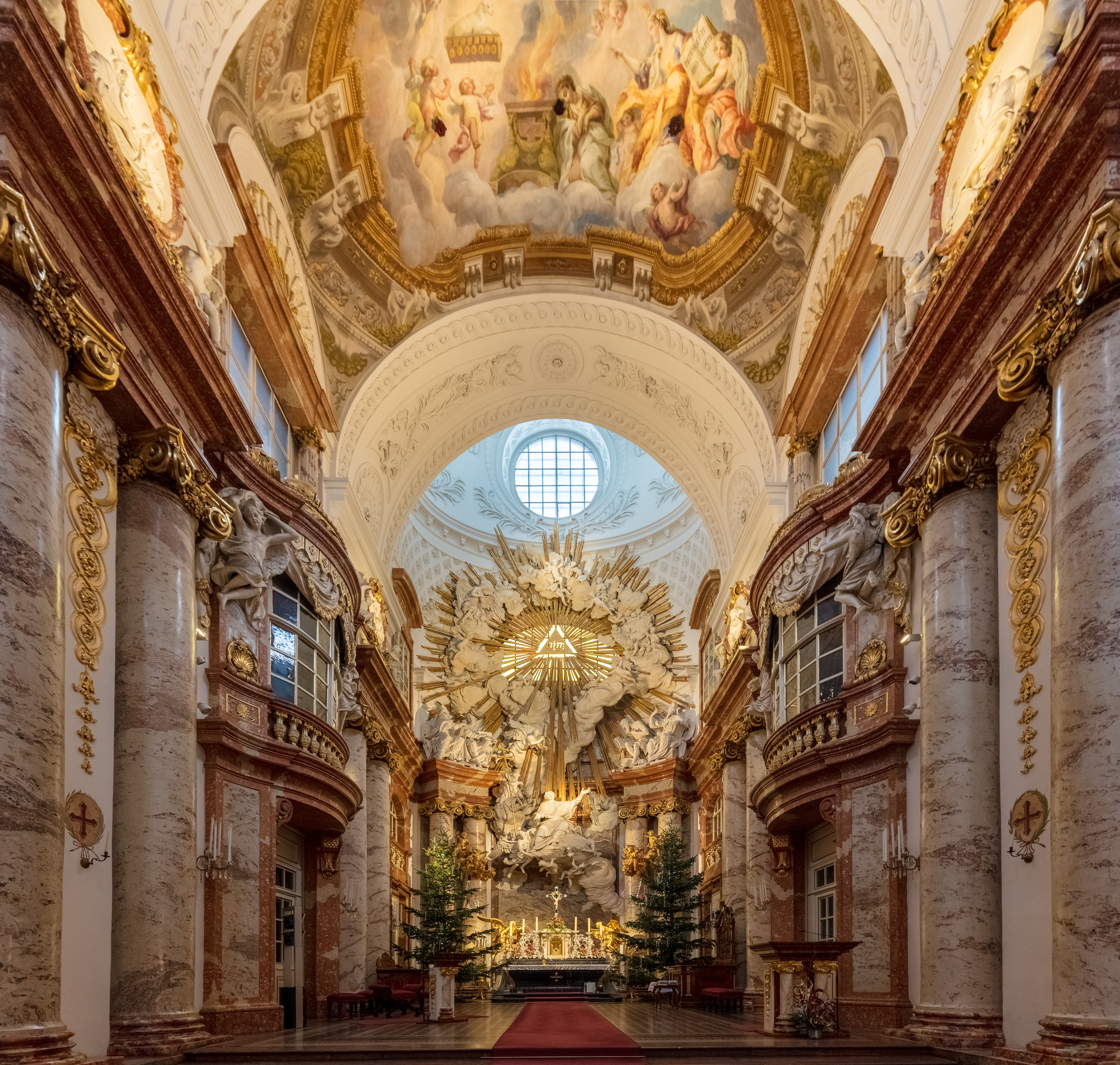
High Altar, Apotheosis of Saint Charles Borromeo, by Alberto Camesina

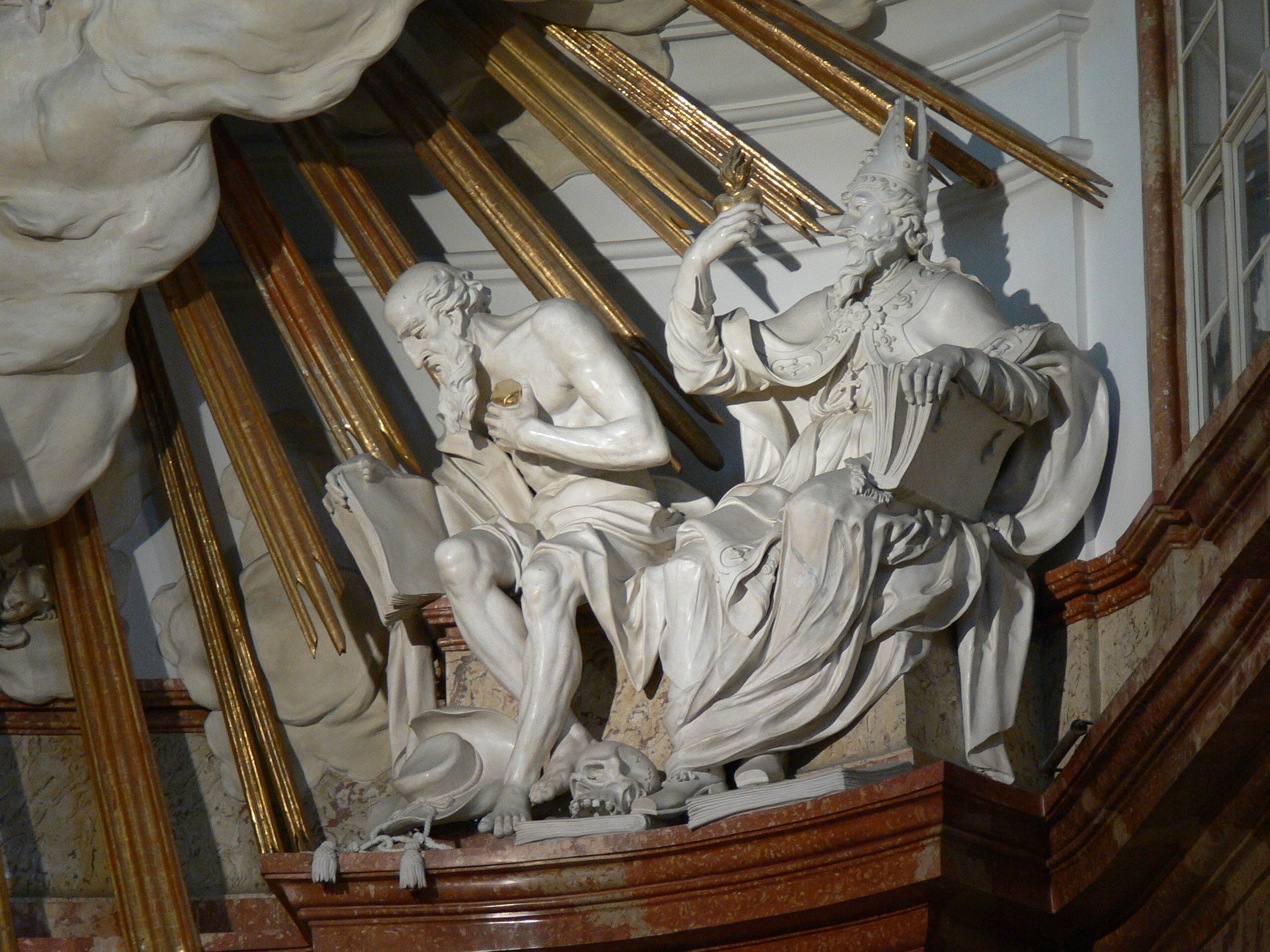
Saints Jerome and Augustine, High Altar, by Johann Bernhard Fischer von Erlach

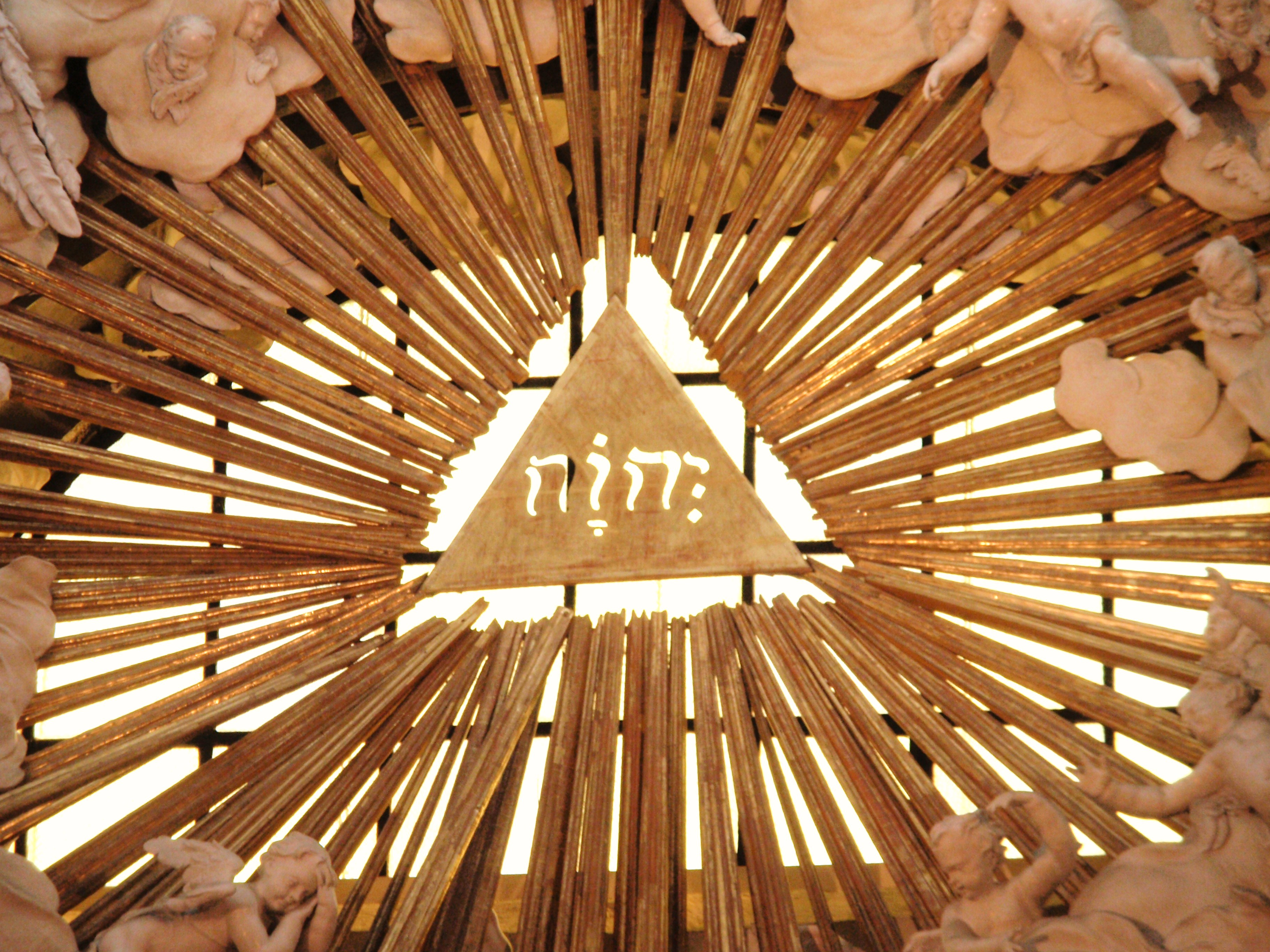
The gold piece high above the altar symbolizing Yahweh

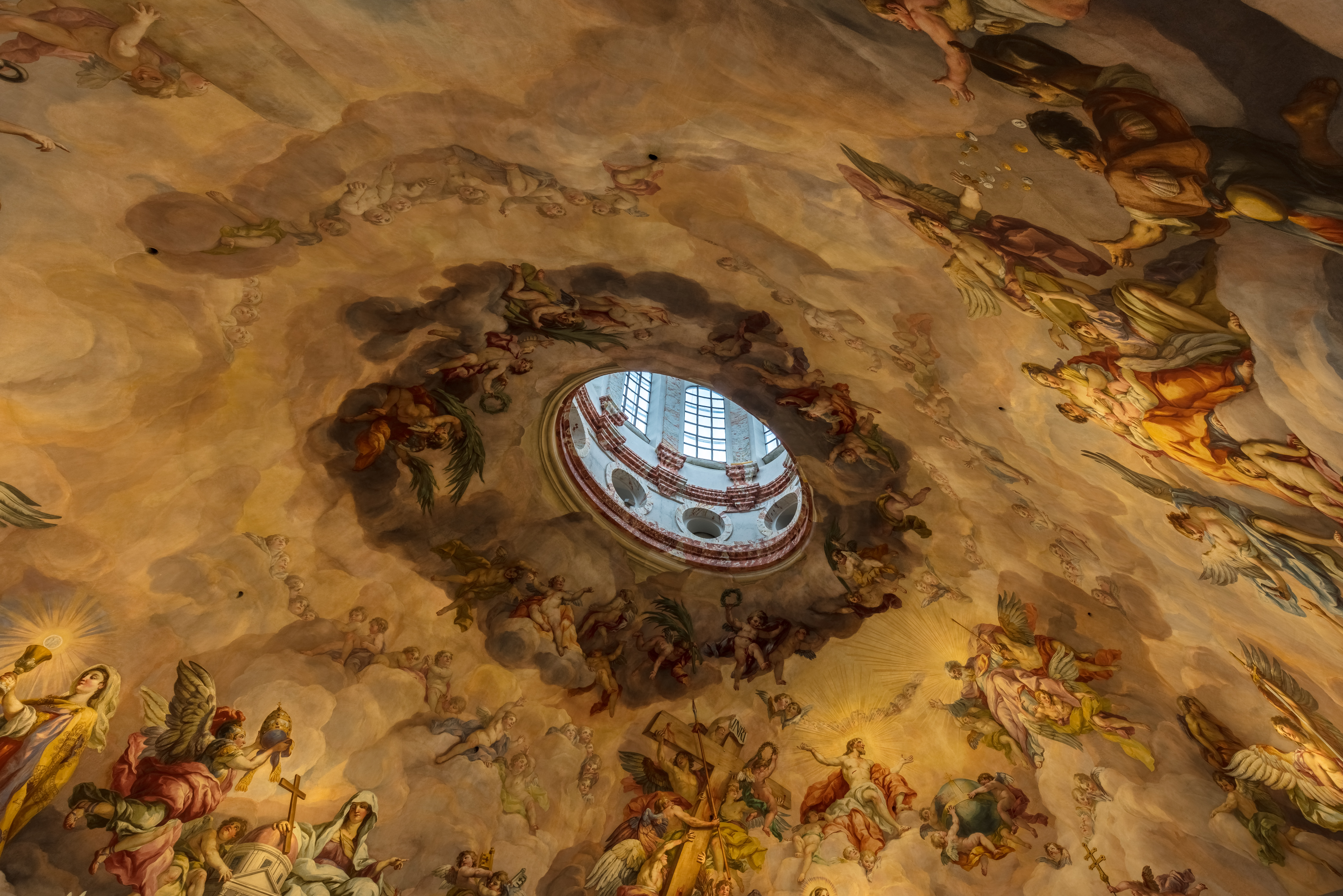
Closer view of the dome

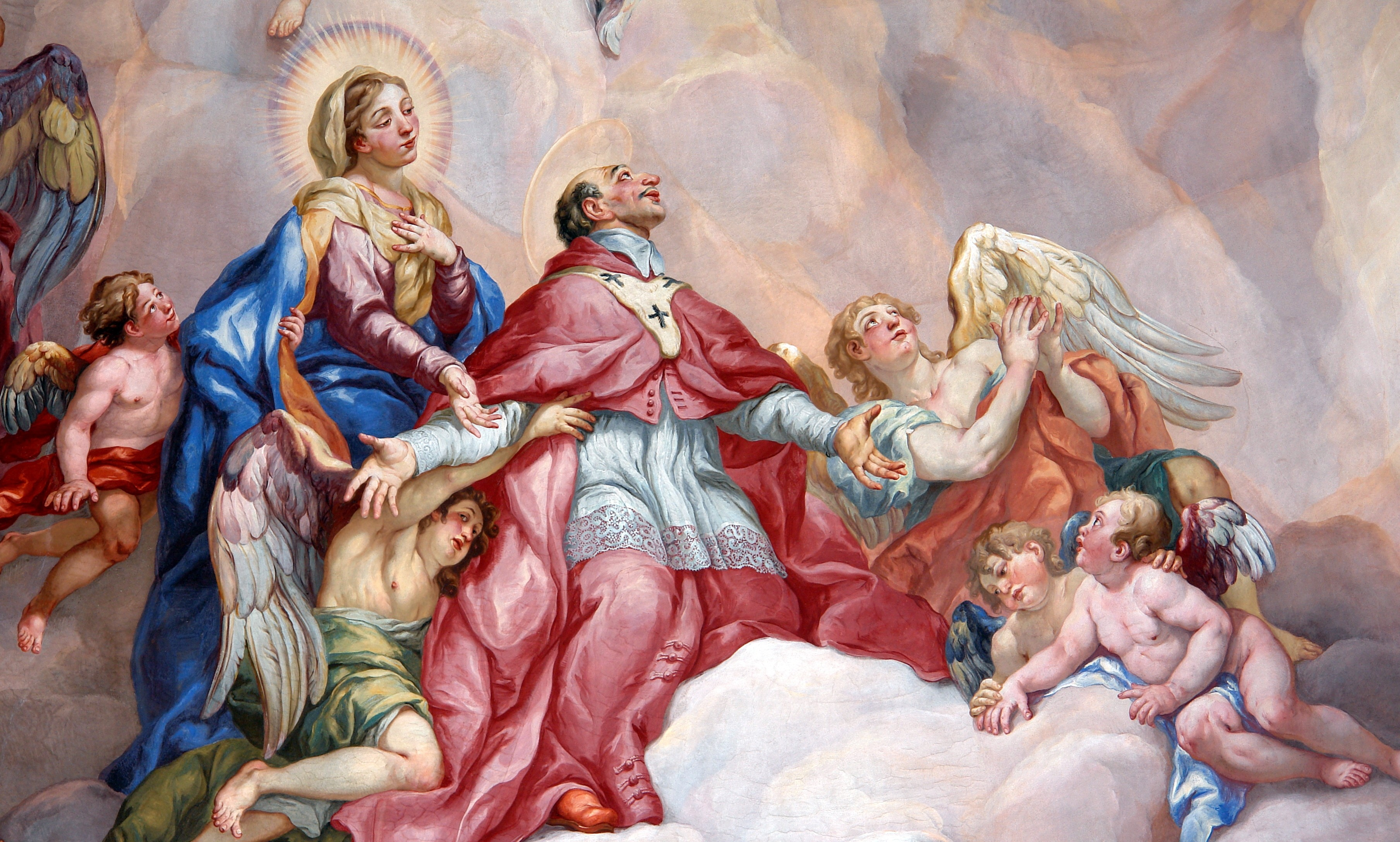
Intercession of Charles Borromeo supported by the Virgin Mary by Rottmayr

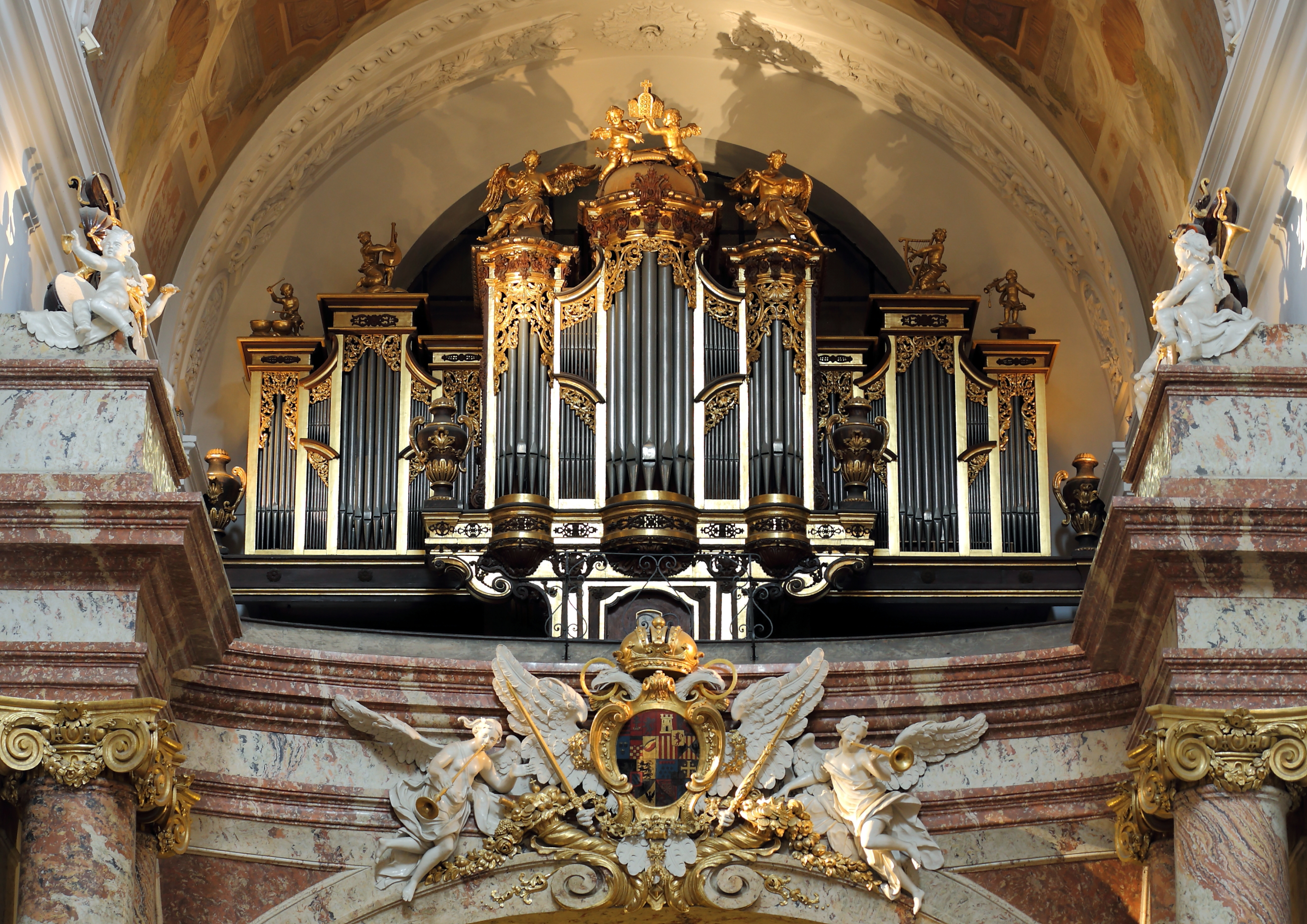
Organ loft

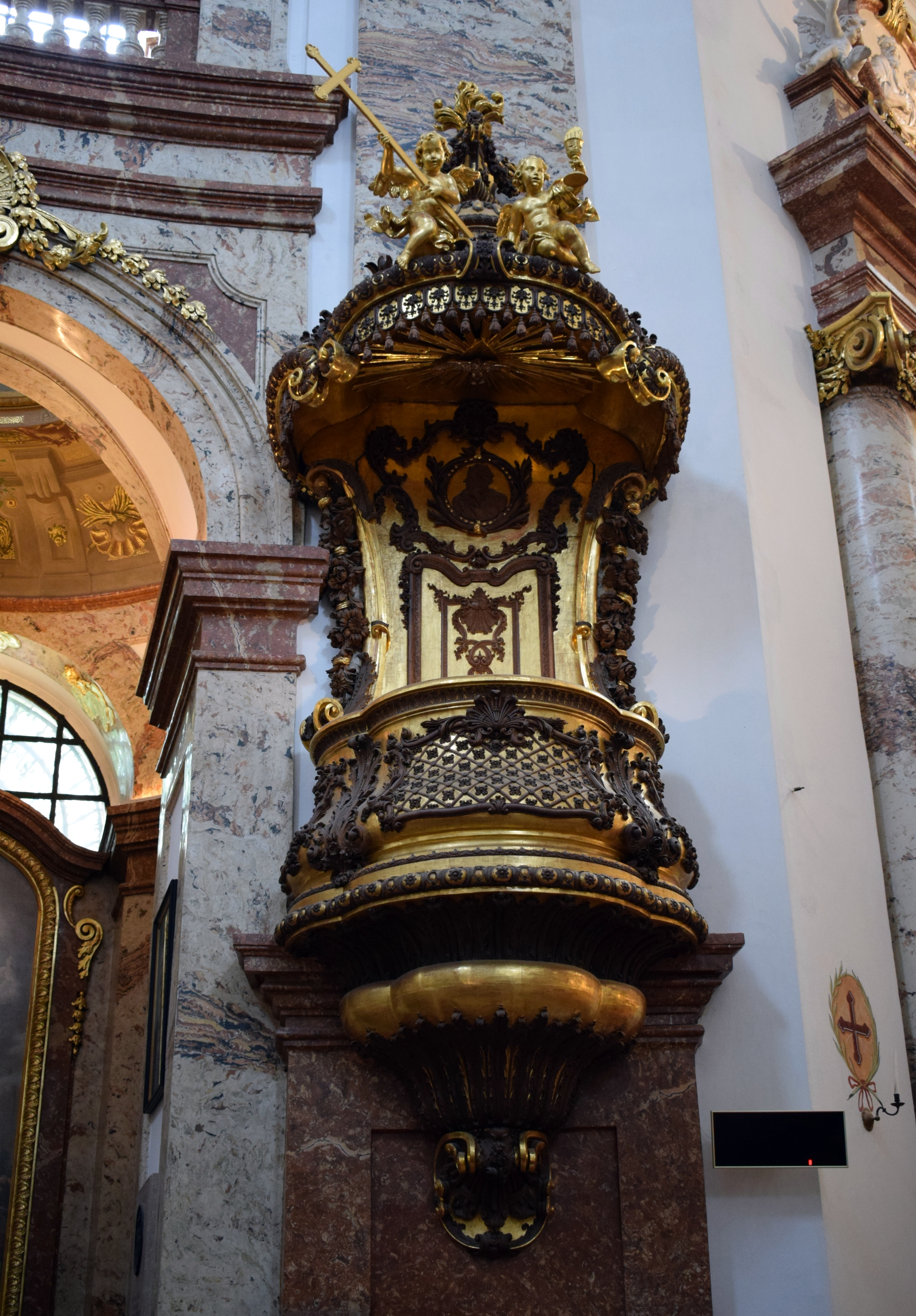
The restored canopy of the abat-voix

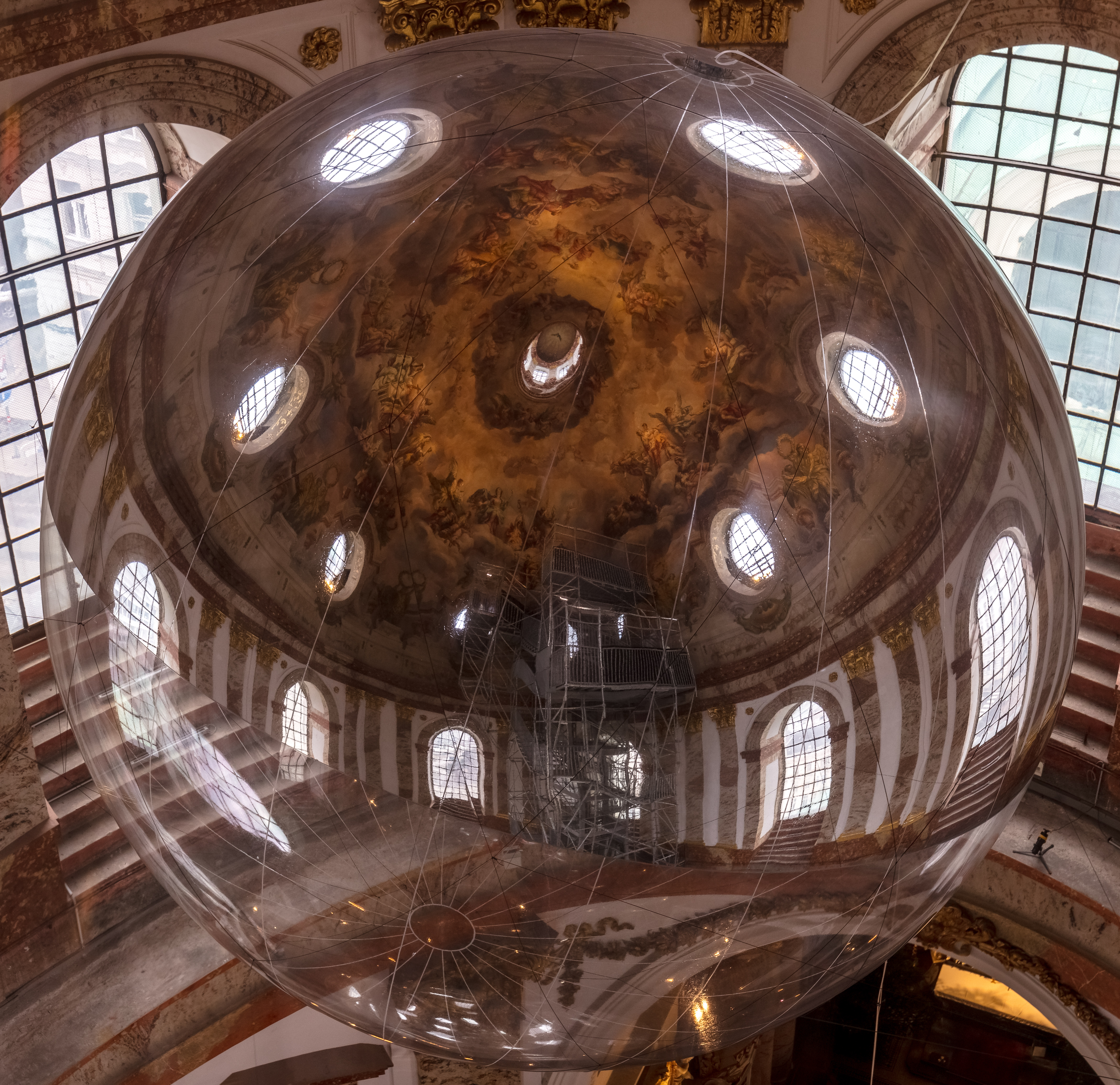
Huge reflecting ball inside the church

== See also ==
- St. Charles Borromeo Cemetery Church
- 18th-century Western domes
- List of tallest domes
