= Institut français de Vienne =

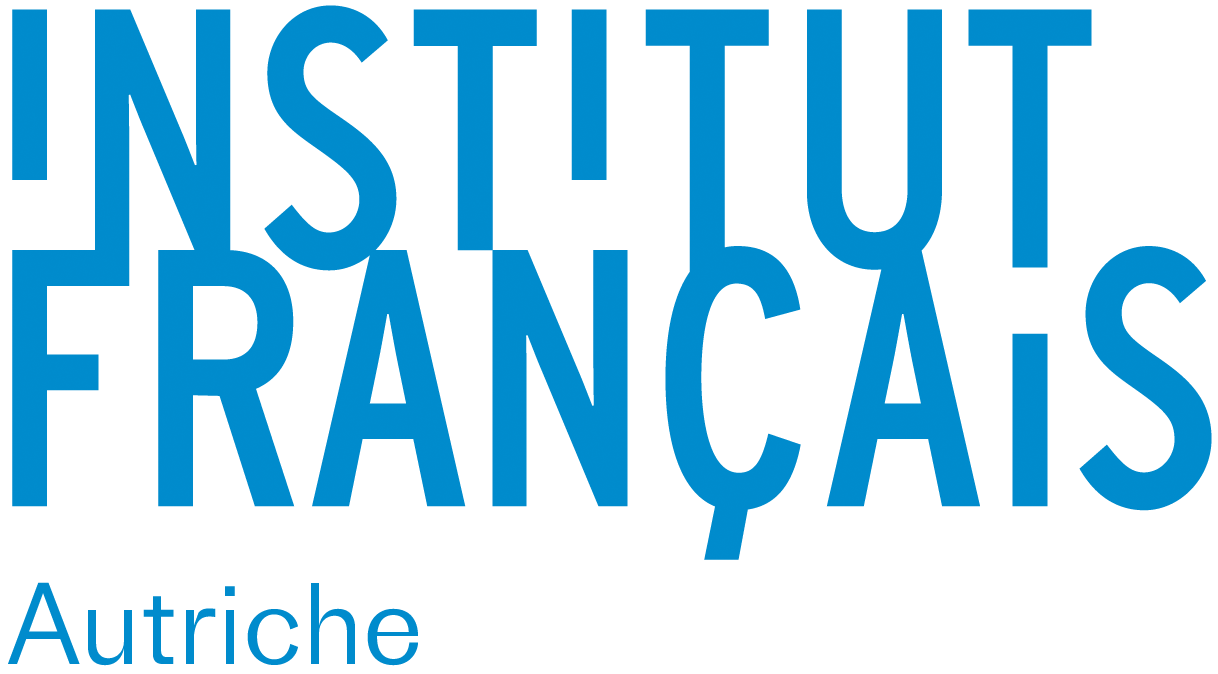

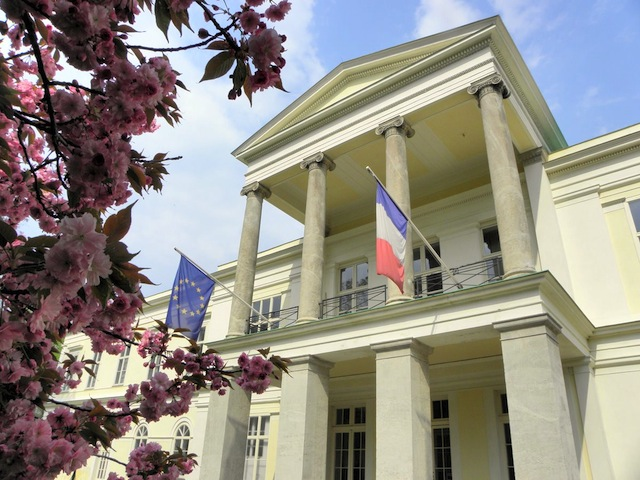
- Formation: 1926
- Purpose: Cultural exchange
- Headquarters: Palais Clam-Gallas, Währinger Strasse 30, 1090 Wien
- Coordinates: 48.2201°N 16.3577°E
- Region served: Austria
- Director: Guillaume Rousson
- Website: institut-francais.at/vienne/
- Formerly called: Centre de hautes études françaises à Vienne

The Institut français de Vienne or French Institute in Vienna is an Institut français in Vienna, Austria. It is a French public institution attached to the Ministry of Foreign and European Affairs of France. The promotion of French culture overseas is its main mission. The French Institute in Vienna is housed in the Palais Clam-Gallas.

== History ==
The institute was founded in 1926 as the Centre de hautes études françaises à Vienne, or centre for higher French studies in Vienna. It was closed following the Anschluss of 1938 and throughout the Second World War. It re-opened on 10 November 1947 in the Palais Lobkowitz, which had previously been the French embassy. Since 1981, the institute has occupied the Palais Clam-Gallas, which was acquired by France from the Clam-Gallas family in 1952. Guillaume Rousson has been Director of the institute since September 2011.

== The Institute ==
The French Institute in Vienna aims promote cultural exchange between France and Austria. According to its mission statement, it does so in five ways: through the teaching of French language; through promotion of contemporary French culture; through the library of the institute; by providing an open forum for intercultural exchange; and by assisting academic and scientific exchange.

The Institute organises in-house cultural events, and gives financial or material support other events elsewhere in Vienna or Austria, including the Viennale, the Impulstanz dance festival and the annual French-language film festival and book fair. It publishes a newsletter with information about French culture in Austria, such as news of forthcoming film releases, exhibitions and touring artists.

The library of the institute holds 25,000 documents in French and around 1,200 DVDs, and offers online access to the French press.

== EUNIC ==
The French Institute in Vienna is a member of the European Union National Institutes for Culture (EUNIC) cluster in Vienna, a network of European cultural institutes and embassies in Vienna. The cluster organises an annual EUNIC week in the city. In 2013 the Presidency of the cluster was held by the French Institute in Vienna, represented by its director.
