= Gaetano Fanti =

Austrian painter (1687–1759)

Gaetano Fanti (1687 – 27 September 1759) was an Italian fresco painter born in Bologna, Papal States.

== Biography ==
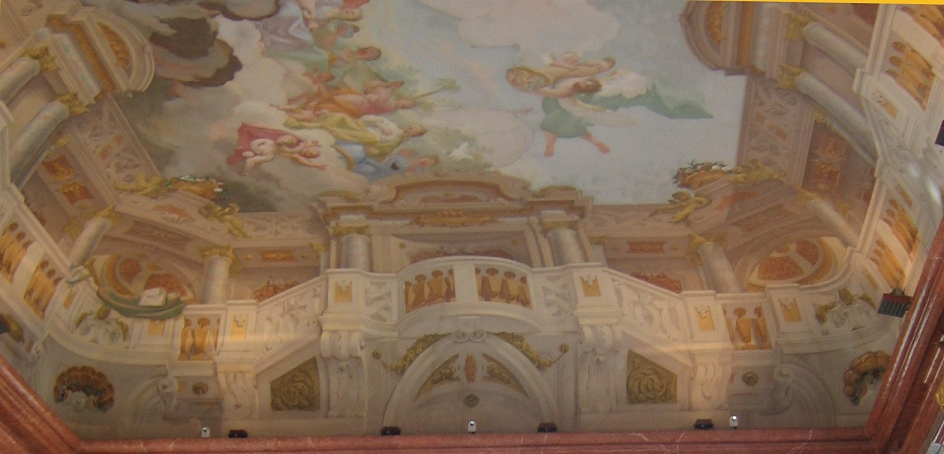
Ceiling by Fanti at Melk Abbey

In 1715 Fanti was appointed by Prince Eugene of Savoy in Vienna. Together with figure painters such as Johann Michael Rottmayr, Paul Troger and Bartolomeo Altomonte he was involved in major frescoes. He is particularly noted for his work in Austria, including on the Karlskirche, the Melk Abbey, the Belvedere Palace and the Klosterneuburg Monastery. He died in Vienna.
