= Gioacchino Pizzoli =

Italian painter

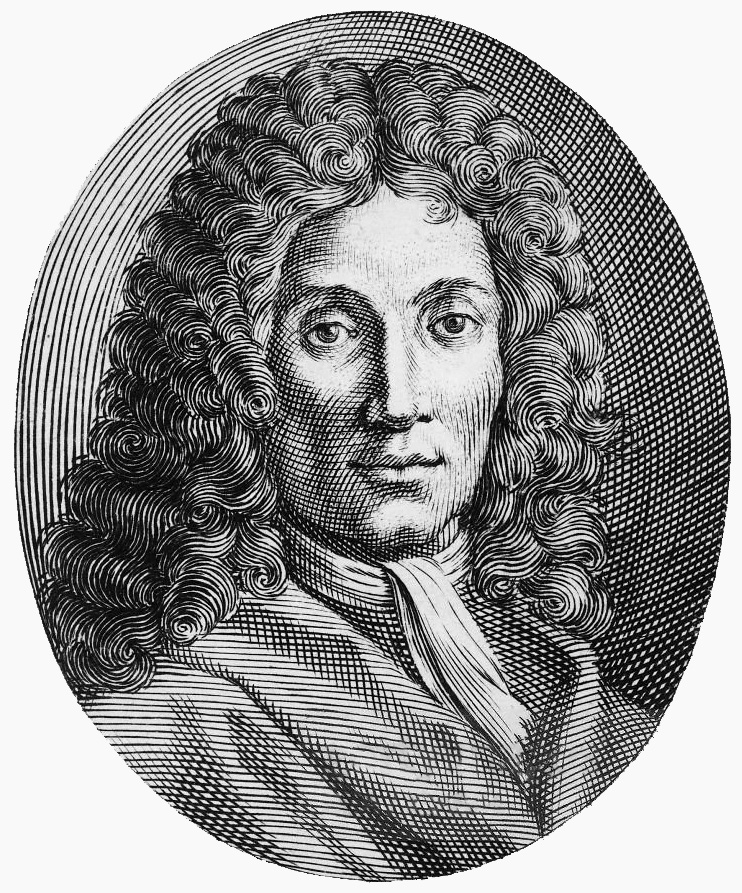

Gioacchino Pizzoli (1651 in Bologna – 1733) was an Italian painter, active as a history and figure painter during the Baroque period.

== Biography ==
He was trained in Bologna, Papal States and married the painter Maria Oriana Galli da Bibbiena (1656–1749), the daughter of Giovanni Maria of the Galli da Bibiena family. Their son Domenico Pizzoli (1687–1720) was also a painter. A daughter joined a monastery in Reggio-Emilia.

From 1675 to 1677, along with his master, the quadratura painter Angelo Michele Colonna, he painted the Sala del Consiglio Comunale (once the Gallery of the Senate) of the Palazzo D'Accursio. He also helped fresco the Oratory of Santa Maria del Borgo in Bologna. Also in 1700, in Bologna, Pizzoli decorated the Illyrian-Hungarian College (Italian: Collegio Ungaro-Illirici, now the Venturoli College, Collegio Venturoli) with frescoes on the history of Croatia and Hungary.

== Reading ==
- Ingrid Sjöström, Quadratura. Studies in Italian Ceiling Paintings, Stockholm, Almqvist och Wiksell, 1978. ISBN 978-91-22-00176-8
