= Domenico Francia =

Italian painter and architect (1702–1758)

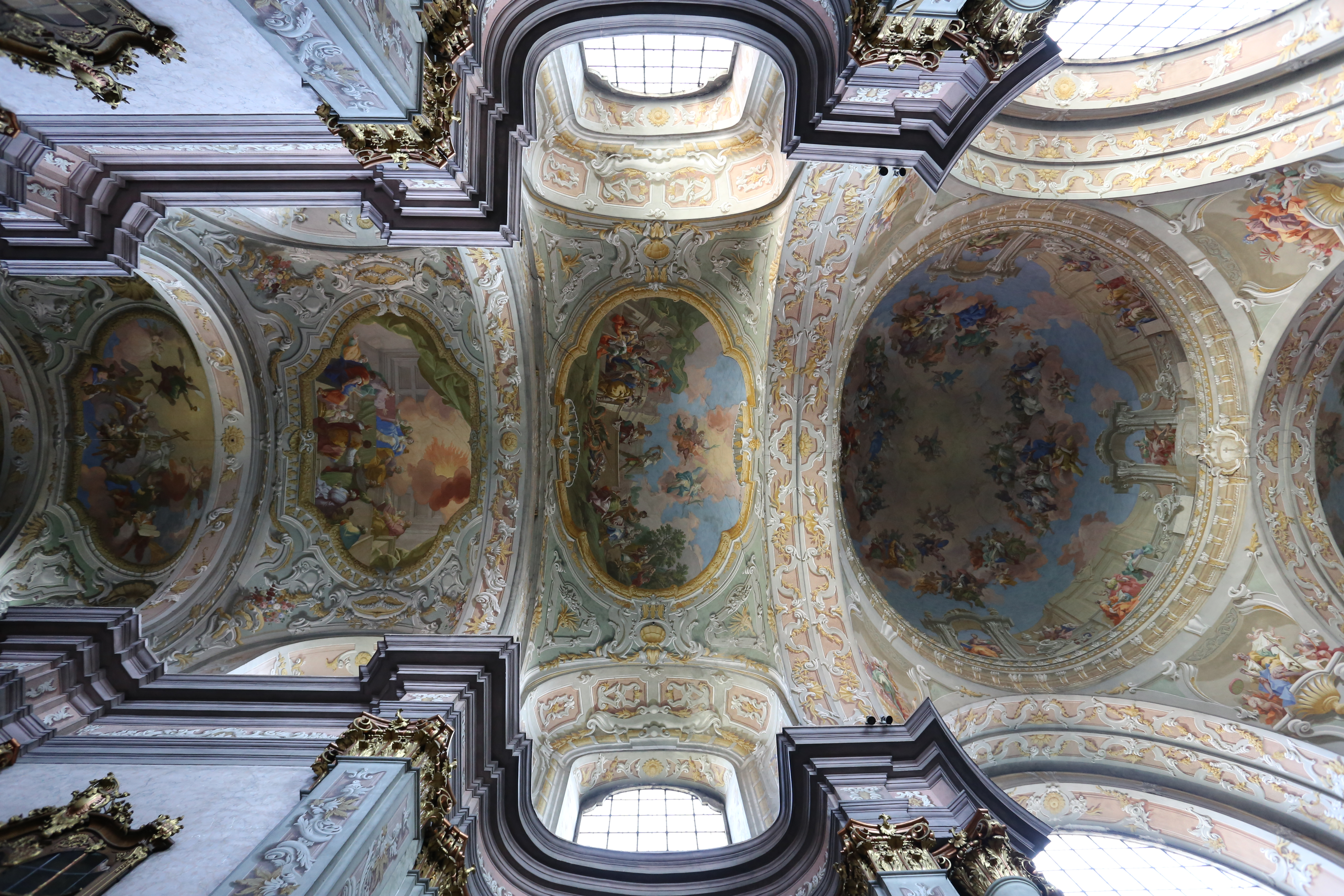
Painting in Herzogenburg Priory

Domenico Francia (1702–1758) was an Italian painter and architect.

He was born in Bologna, the son of the engraver Francesco Maria Domenico Francia, and studied under Ferdinando Galli (called Bibiena), whom he assisted in his paintings at Vienna. He was afterwards appointed builder to the King of Sweden, and on the expiration of this service painted at other European courts.
