= Palazzo Ferrari Sacchini, Piacenza =

Coordinates: 45°03′07″N 9°41′44″E

The Palazzo Ferrari Sacchini is a Baroque architecture-style aristocratic palace located at Via Giosuè Carducci #11 in central Piacenza, region of Emilia-Romagna in Italy. The palace also is referred to as the Palazzo Ferrari-Sacchini-Calciati-Costa referring to subsequent owners. The palace is now home to the local ministry of the treasury.

== History ==
The palace was designed circa 1680 putatively by the architect Ferdinando Galli-Bibiena under the patronage of Count Corrado Ferrari.

The facade has a rusticated stone base. At the piano nobile rises monumental pilasters. The window tympani are decorated playfully with various sculpted items including helms, scallops, and shields. The roofline frieze is bracketed densely. The central portal has an 18th-century wrought iron balcony.

The grand staircase is richly decorated with stucco, work attributed to Provino Dalmazio della Porta, as well as quadratura frescoes. In the panels are depictions of an allegory of Apollo. The Interior rooms include frescoes depicting Victory of Fame over Time and Triumph of Caesar by Robert de Longe and Apollo and Satyrs by Giovanni Battista Natali. The palace was once decorated by still lives painted by Marcantonio Rizzi.
