= Palais Clam-Gallas (Vienna) =

Palace in Vienna

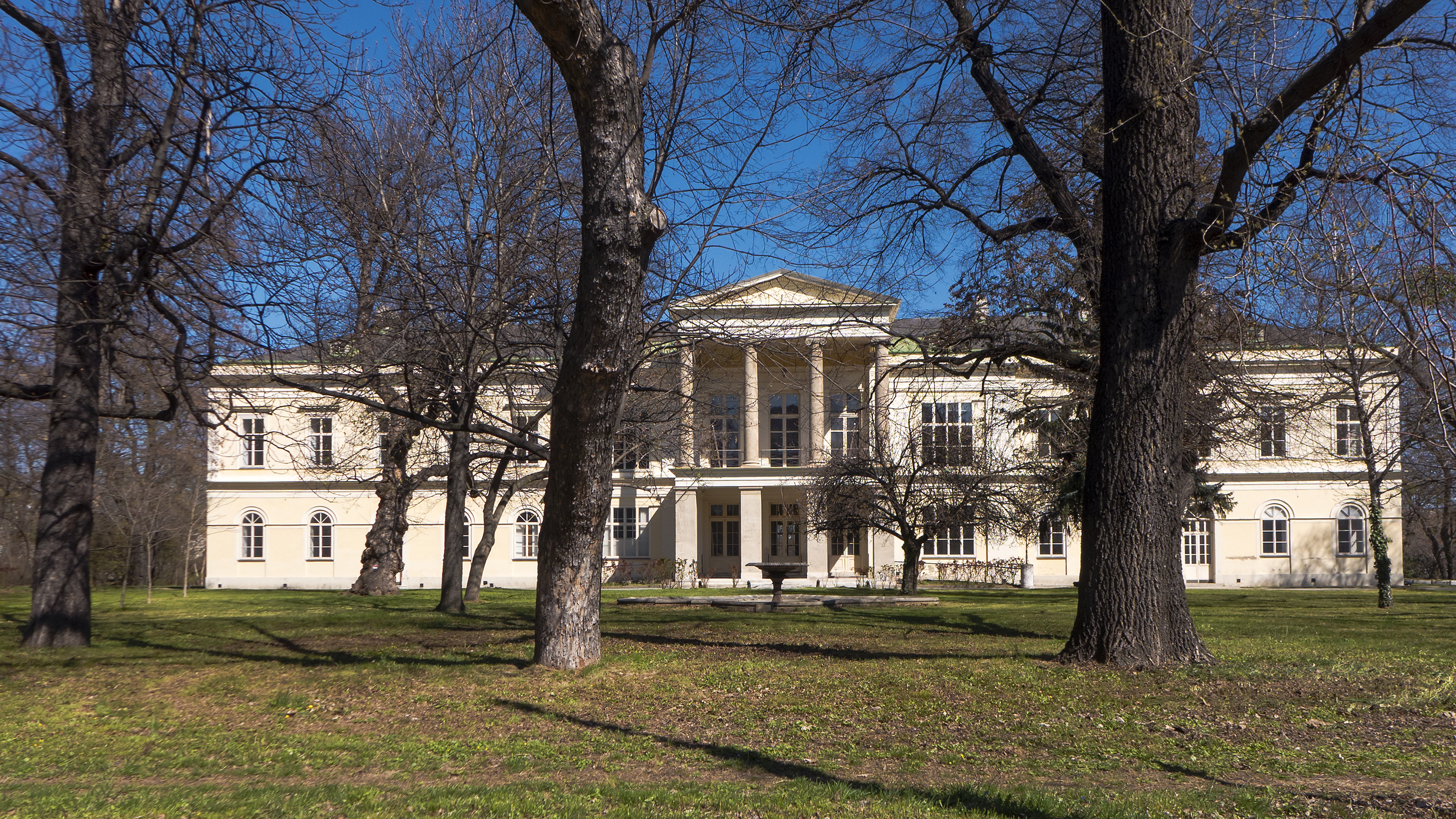
- Interactive map of the Palais Clam-Gallas area
- Former names: Palais Dietrichstein; Sommerpalais Dietrichstein
- Alternative names: Gartenpalais Clam-Gallas

General information
- Type: Lustschloss
- Architectural style: Neo-Classical; Biedermeier
- Location: Währinger Strasse 30, 1090 Wien, Vienna, Austria
- Coordinates: 48.2201°N 16.3577°E
- Completed: c. 1835
- Client: Franz Joseph, Prince of Dietrichstein

Design and construction
- Architect: Heinrich Koch

The Palais Clam-Gallas is a historic palace in the Neo-Classical or Biedermeier style in Vienna, Austria. It was built as a summer residence in the mid 1830s by Franz Joseph, Prince of Dietrichstein.

== History ==
The building was constructed as a summertime Lustschloss (pleasure palace) in 1834 or 1835 for Franz Joseph, Prince of Dietrichstein. It was built in a park – laid out as an English garden – which had belonged to his family since 1690.

The palace's architect was Heinrich Koch. The building is in a Neo-Classical style typical of the Biedermeier period. It passed by marriage into the Clam-Gallas family in 1850.

Following the Second World War, it was used by American troops. The Clam-Gallas family sold it to the Republic of France in 1952.

The Lycée Français de Vienne was built on a part of the grounds in 1954. The palace housed the Institut français de Vienne (the French institute in Vienna) from 1980 until 2015, when the property was sold.
