= Austrian Theatre Museum =

Museum in Vienna, Austria

Coordinates: 48°12′20″N 16°22′6″E

Theatermuseum
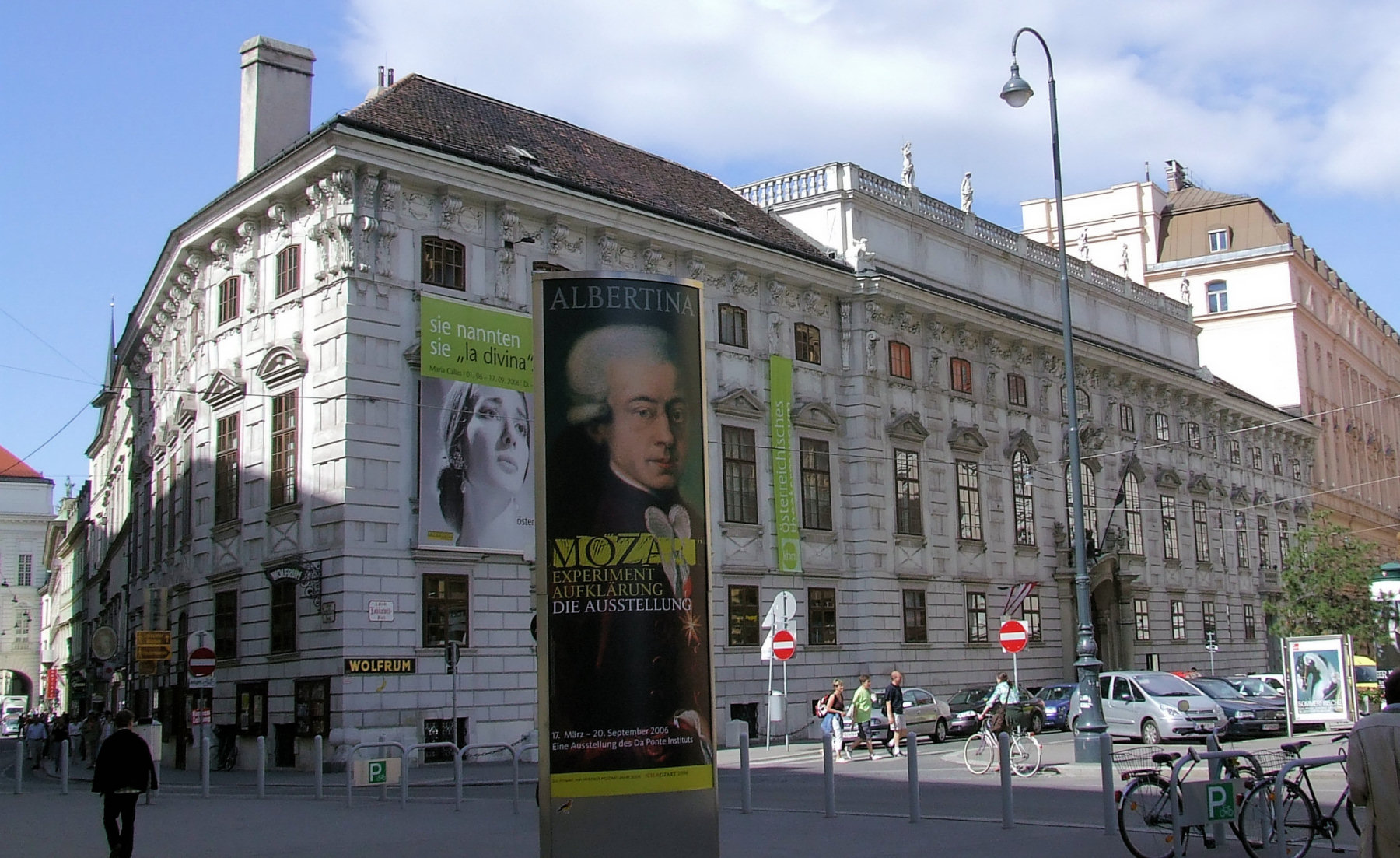
- Established: 1975
- Location: Vienna, Austria
- Visitors: 13.850 (2021)
- Website: web.archive.org/web/20090423120832/http://www.khm.at:80/de/oesterreichisches-theatermuseum

The Theatermuseum is a federal museum of national theatre history. Since 1991 it is situated in the Palais Lobkowitz in Vienna.

== History ==
The museum has its origins in the theatre-related collections of the Austrian National Library, dating back to the late 17th century. In 1922 the theatrical collections were set up as a separate organisation, under the directorship of Joseph Gregor (1888-1960), who with his spectacular exhibition from the library holdings in the same year succeeded in attracting the gift of the enormous private collection of theatre items belonging to Hugo Thimig, director of the Burgtheater. In 1938, Stefan Zweig bequeathed his eminent collection of poets' and playwrights' autographs to the museum - before he had to flee the Nazis. The museum also holds one of the major bequests of Viennese Modernism: the bequest of writer Hermann Bahr.

The purpose of the theatre-related collections was not limited to printed and archival items but to concentrate on the entire diversity of theatrical objects. The idea of a theatre museum was put forward in the 1930s but could not be realized until 1975, when the Austrian Theatre Museum was finally founded initially in the premises of Hanuschhof next to the Wiener Oper. Its prime function was to arrange exhibitions of the existing material in the Austrian National Library. The premises became, however, very soon too small, and at length the Austrian Government acquired and renovated the Palais Lobkowitz, opening as Österreichisches Theatermuseum on 26 October 1991.

With the opening of the new museum the theater collections of the Austrian National Library were combined with the assets of the Theatermuseum and one of the largest and most important collections in the theatrical field was established, together with the appropriate facilities to present the portfolio in exquisite showrooms. In 2001 the Theatermuseum ceased to be part of the Austrian National Library and instead became part of the Kunsthistorisches Museum. As of September 1, 2014, the Wiener Staatsopernmuseum, founded in 2005, was closed down and the assets were incorporated into the holdings of the Theatermuseum.

== Building ==
The Theatermuseum houses a grand concert hall, the Eroica Hall, called after Beethoven’s Third Symphony, dedicated to the composer's patron and owner of the palace, Franz Joseph Maximilian Prince Lobkowitz. Subsequently, many of Beethoven’s compositions were performed at the Palais Lobkowitz.

== Collections ==
At the Theater Museum highlights of the magic of stage are caught forever. More than 1,000 stage models, 600 costumes and props from three centuries, more than 100,000 drawings and prints as well as more than 700,000 theater photos are among the holdings of the museum. A special room is devoted to the Jugendstil artist Richard Teschner (1879–1948), showing his elaborate stick puppets and his marvelous Figurenspiegel (concave mirror with light effects). In total the museum comprises more than 2,000,000 separate objects.

The library contains about 100,000 books and periodicals, and unlike the rest of the collections is technically still the property of the National Library, on permanent loan to the Theatre Museum.

== Exhibitions ==
2015: Der Meister Tön' und Weisen ... Heinz Zednik - 50 Jahre Staatsoper und ExistenzFest. Hermann Nitsch und das Theater

== Sources ==
- "Theatermuseum". Theatermuseum (in German).
- "The Kunsthistorisches Museum". KHM.at. 2025-09-30.
- "Theatermuseum - zu meinem Reiseplan hinzufügen". Archived from the original on 2021-01-18.
- "Österreichisches Theatermuseum". Archived from the original on 2015-09-23.
