= Joseph Emanuel Fischer von Erlach =

Austrian architect (1693–1742)

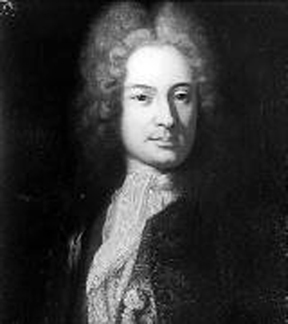
- Born: 13 September 1693; Vienna
- Died: 29 June 1742 (aged 48); Vienna
- Occupation: Architect
- Buildings: Karlskirche; Bonțida Bánffy Castle; Palais Lobkowitz, Vienna; Slavkov Castle

Joseph Emanuel Fischer von Erlach, also Fischer von Erlach the Younger (13 September 1693 in Vienna – 29 June 1742 in Vienna) was an Austrian architect of the Baroque, Rococo, and Baroque-Neoclassical.

== Biography ==
Joseph Emanuel was the son of Johann Bernhard Fischer von Erlach. He first developed his skills in his father's workshop. From 1711, he worked on several of his father's commissions (e.g. Palais Dietrichstein, Palais Trautson, Bohemian Court Chancellery, Schwarzenberg Palace) and also helped complete the publication Draft of a Historical Architecture, whose four volumes inspired many later designs. Through this work, Joseph Emanuel came into contact both with the architecture of his and earlier times and with Berne, his father's noble order.

His father also involved Joseph Emanuel in the writing of Folders and Outlines of Some Buildings of Vienna, self-drawn from J.E.F.v.E., with a preface by the court antiquarian Carl Gustav Heraeus. This publication was resumed later by Salomon Kleiner.

Until 1714, he received instruction in Vienna from his father's guest Gottfried Leibniz. The two obtained a travel scholarship for Joseph Emanuel from Kaiser Karl VI. This led him in 1714 to Italy, where he accompanied, among others, the well-known archaeologist Francesco de Ficoroni.

From 1717 to 1719, he was in France with the French court master-builder Robert de Cotte, the architect Germain Boffrand, and the philologist Bernard de Montfaucon. He also spent time in Leyden and London, where he studied the re-invented Steam engines and possibly also met Isaac Newton.

In 1722 he returned to Vienna. He sought and obtained (in December 1722) a court architect position where he also exercised his considerable technical abilities, building the first steam engine in continental Europe (at Schwarzenberg Palace) during the same year. After the death of his father in 1723, Johann Lucas von Hildebrandt succeeded to the position of chief Court Architect. In 1725, Joseph Emanuel, succeeded in turn to this position, probably with the help of his powerful sponsor, Court Building director, count Gundaker von Althan, completing his father's unfinished projects. Though a successful architect in his own right, he was overshadowed by his more famous father.

In 1727, he married Maria Anna von Dietrich, with whom he had seven children. He lived in the Gerstenbrandische Haus (Gerstenbrandi house) near the Kärntner Gate. He had an important art collection and extensive library. His wife died in 1740.

In 1729, Joseph Emanuel was appointed Imperial Court Chamber Advisor and dedicated himself increasingly to building steam engines for mine excavation. For this work he was made a Baron in 1735.

He continued some projects of his father, in particular the Karlskirche, the Imperial Library, and the Winterreitschultrakt of the Hofburg. He was involved with the planning of the Traktes of the Hofburg for Michaelerplatz, which was built only much later (1889–1893) by Ferdinand Kirschner, with some modifications, since the Hofburg Theatre stood in the way. On the same plans was also based the Alte Bibliothek in Berlin, which from 1775 to 1780 was built by George Christian Unger. In 1728, he replaced Johann Lucas von Hildebrandt with the building the Reichskanzleitraktes of the Hofburg. Otherwise, few of his own works are securely identifiable, a problem compounded by the lack of clear documentation. Added to this are 1847 the Althan Palace in Vienna on Landstrasse, Corps de logis Eckartsau Castle, and Thürnthal Castle at Fels am Wagram.

Joseph Emanuel Fischer von Erlach died on 29 June 1742 in a house fire. He left an enormous fortune of ƒ130,000.

== Impact ==
Contrary to his father's approach, the son thought in terms of facades, which are however different from those of Hildebrandt and his numerous successors and a perfect example of Western European Baroque classicism: simple, rational and without effusive ornamentation.

== Works ==
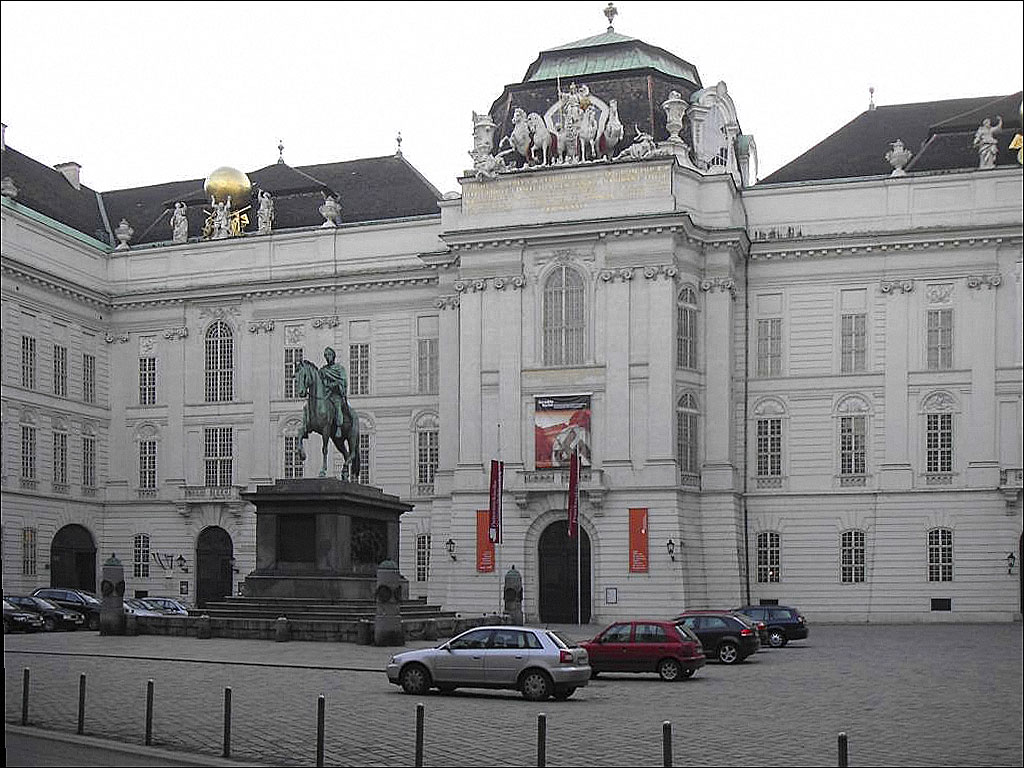
Austrian National Library in Vienna

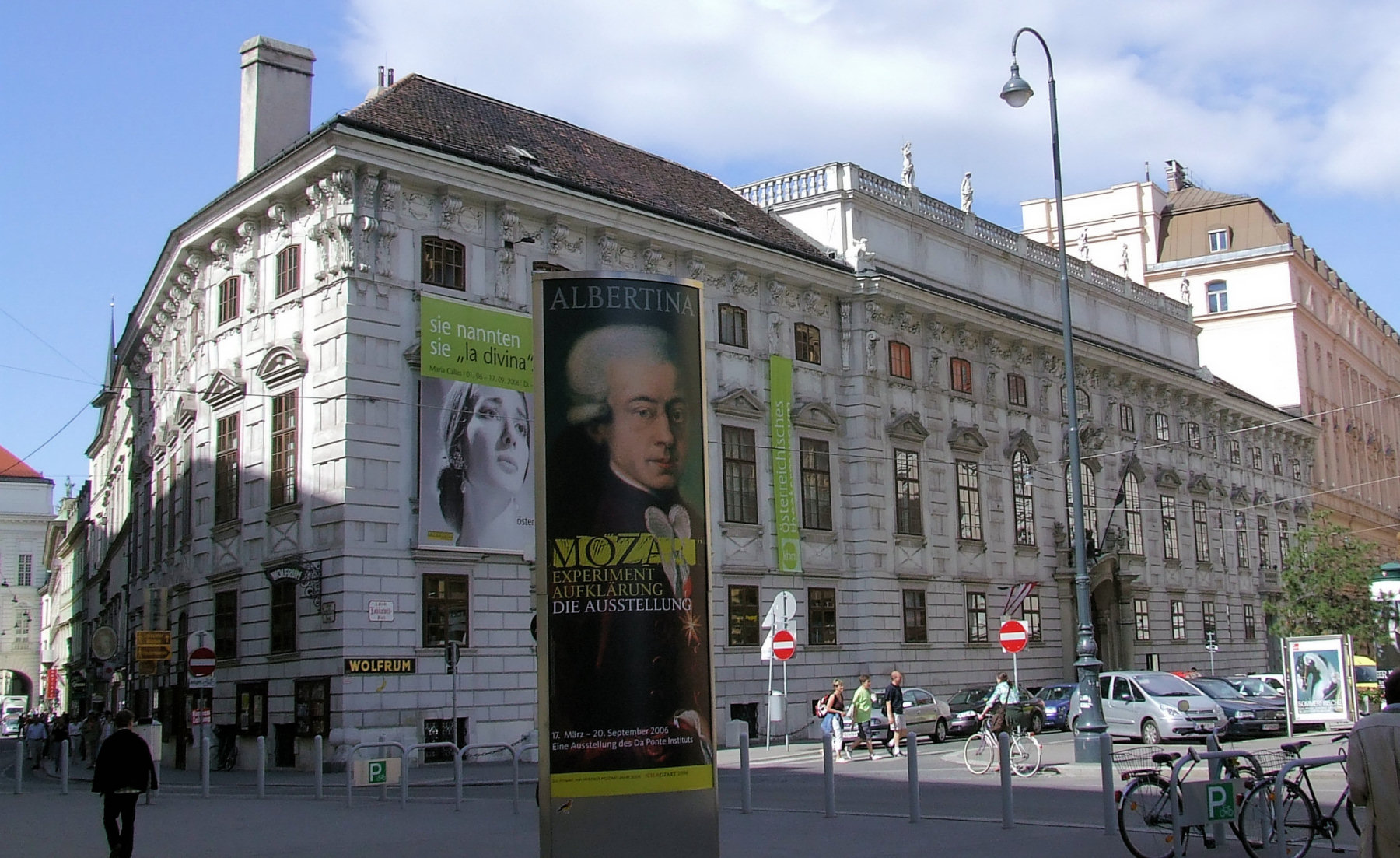
Lobkowitz Palace in Vienna

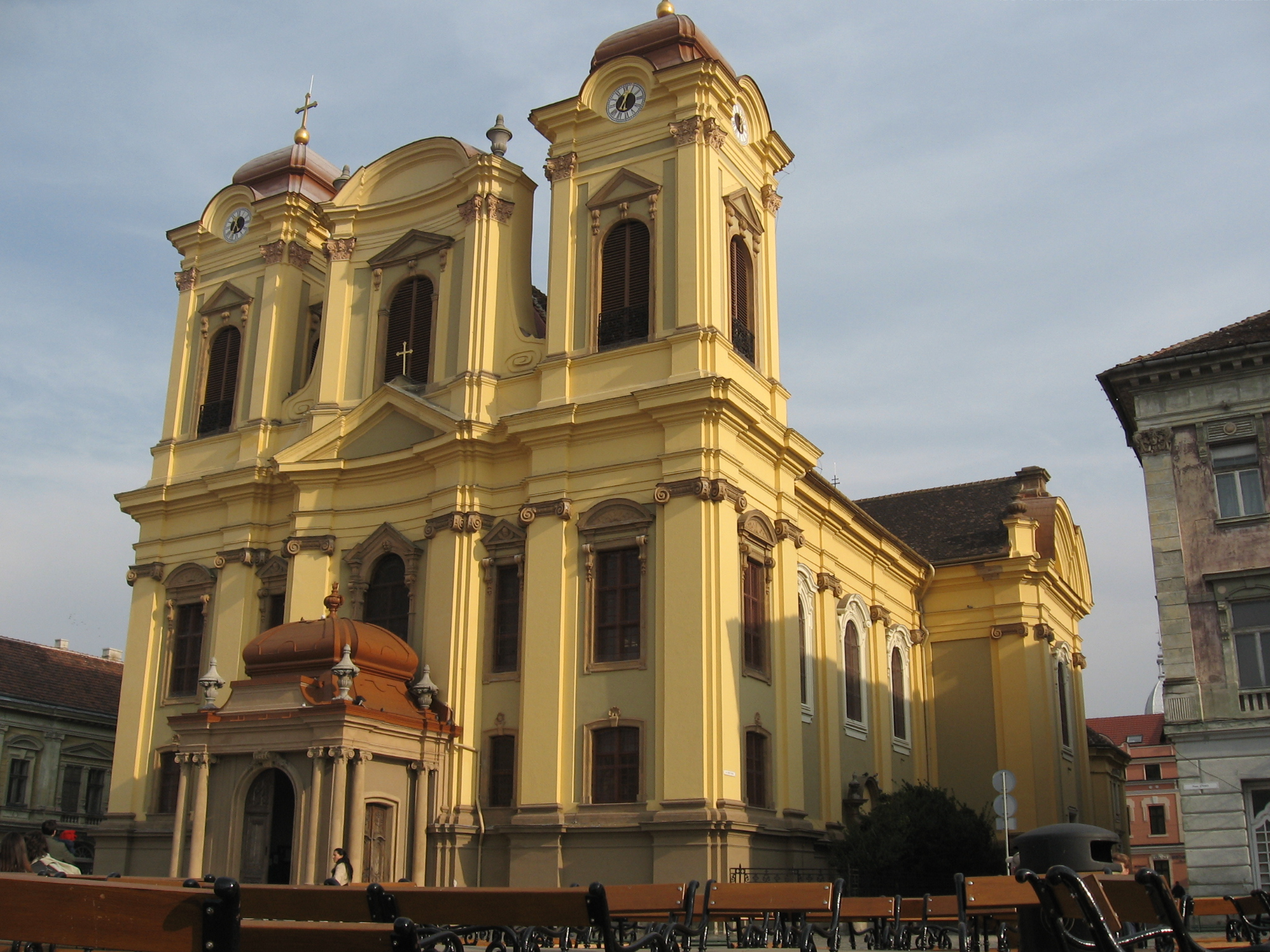
St. George's Cathedral in Timișoara

- Castles and palaces:
  - Hofburg:
    - Execution of Austrian National Library in Vienna, Austria
    - Completion of Hofstallungen (court stable buildings) (1725)
    - Plans to the Michaelertrakt (1726)
    - Winter riding school (1729)
    - Reichskanzleitrakt (court castle continuation after Hildebrandt)
  - Eckartsau Castle, Austria
  - Change of Thürnthal Castle in Fels am Wagram, Austria (1725)
  - Change of Kirchstetten Castle, Austria
  - Change of Jaroslavice Castle, Czech Republic
  - Change of Slavkov Castle, Czech Republic
  - Change of Židlochovice Castle, Czech Republic
  - Change of Vranov nad Dyjí Castle, Czech Republic
  - Althan Palace in Vienna, Austria
  - Completion Schwarzenberg Palace in Vienna, Austria (1728)
  - Change of Lamberg Palace in Vienna, Austria (1730)
  - Change of Lobkowitz Palace in Vienna, Austria
  - Planning of the Knight Academy in Legnica, Poland
  - Planning of the Bonțida Bánffy Castle, Romania
- Sacred buildings:
  - Transformation of the Klosterneuburg Monastery, Austria
  - St. George's Cathedral in Timișoara, Romania (1736)
  - Continuation of Karlskirche in Vienna, Austria
  - Parish church in Grossweikersdorf
  - Planning of the parish church in Hrušovany nad Jevišovkou (1758)
  - Reestablishment of the church and the yard of the parsonage in Šafov, Czech Republic (1745)
- Other:
  - Building of Wedding Fountain in Vienna by plans of his father
  - Honour temples in Graben, Vienna
