= Palais Lobkowitz, Vienna =

Coordinates: 48°12′20″N 16°22′05″E

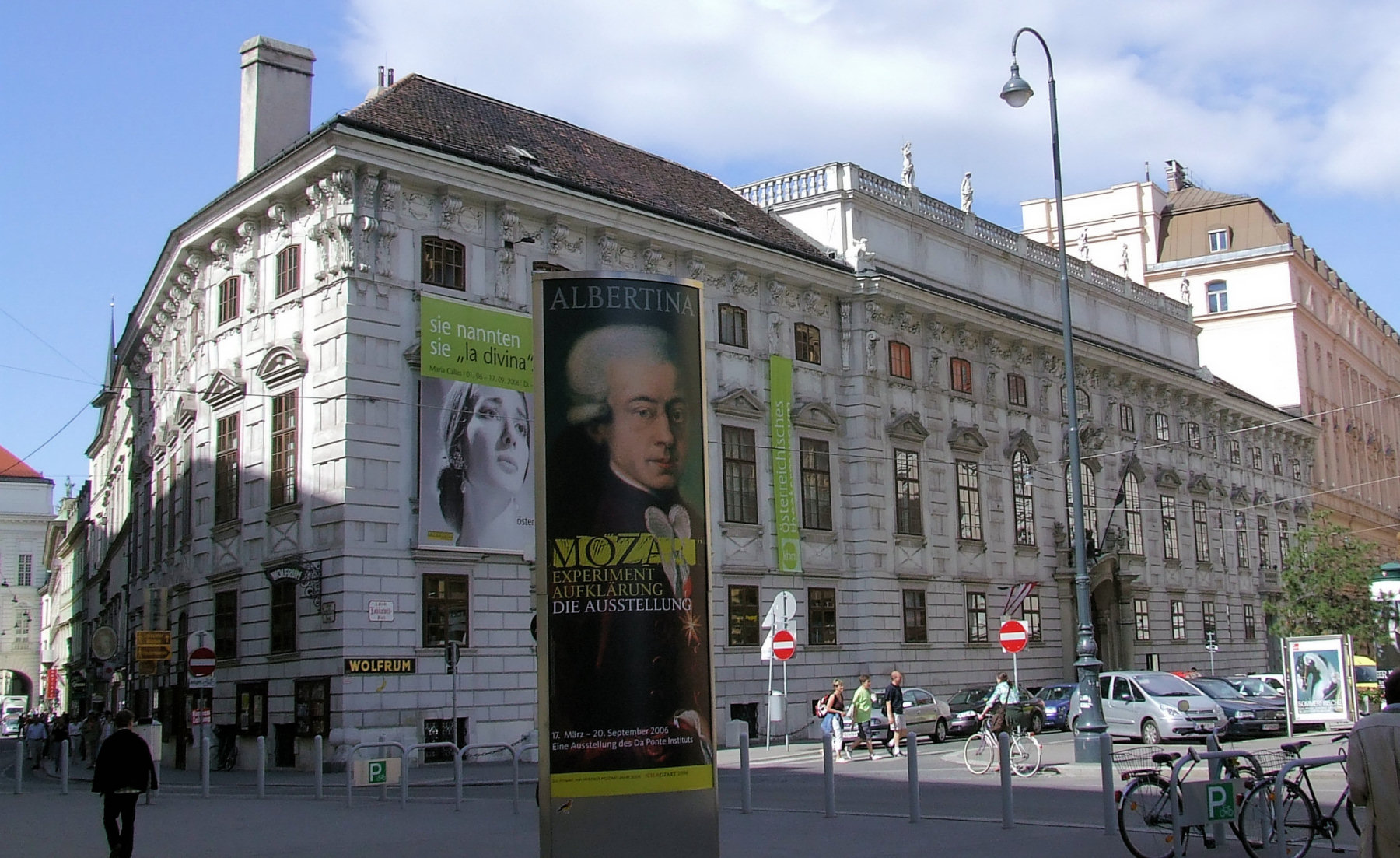
Lobkowitz Palace

Palais Lobkowitz, or Palais Dietrichstein-Lobkowitz, is a Baroque palace in Vienna, Austria. It was owned by the noble Lobkowicz family.

Today, it houses the theatre museum, which is a part of the Kunsthistorisches Museum.

== History ==
The palace is located on the Lobkowitzplatz, a square which previously had been called the "pig market", at which time it was a less distinguished address. The Lobkowitz Palace ranks among the oldest palace buildings of Vienna. The palace is the first important Baroque city palace built after the Battle of Vienna (die zweite Türkenbelagerung), when the aristocracy no longer had to invest its money only for military purposes.

The palace façade, unlike its interior, is still to a large extent in its original condition from the time of its construction. The original building that stood where the palace now stands was sold in 1685 by Leopold Baron von Felss to the imperial Colonel stable master Philipp Sigmund of Dietrichstein. This led to the current palace, built between 1685 and 1687 by Giovanni Pietro Tencala. The new palace occupied not only the site of the house of the Baron von Felss, but also the original site of a neighbouring bathhouse, which was also bought by Philipp Sigmund Count von Dietrichstein.

After repeated ownership changes (among the owners, Count Wenzel Gallas), the palace was bought in 1745 by Ferdinand Philipp Prince von Lobkowicz. The palace remained from that time up to 1980 in the possession of the Lobkowicz family.

Under the Lobkowicz family, the palace underwent several renovations. At the beginning of the 18th century, most notably, Johann Bernhard Fischer von Erlach and his son Joseph Emanuel Fischer von Erlach were entrusted with the project.

In the early 19th century, Ludwig van Beethoven was often a guest in the palace, since the owner at that time, Joseph Franz Maximilian von Lobkowitz, was an important patron of the composer. Beethoven's Third Symphony was dedicated to the prince, which is why the festival room of the palace was named "Eroica Hall". In 1804, Beethoven's Third Symphony was performed for the first time in Vienna in this hall, with the composer as conductor.

During the Congress of Vienna, numerous celebrations and balls were held in the palace. Around the middle of the 19th century, the Lobkowiczs transferred their major residence to their hereditary palace in Roudnice nad Labem, northern Bohemia, and released their Viennese residence for letting.

Between 1869 and 1909, the house was used as the French embassy.

From 1919 to 1938, the Czechoslovak legation was accommodated there.

After end of the Second World War, the house was used as seat of the Institut Français de Vienne. In 1980, the palace became government property, and since 1991, after a comprehensive renovation, it has served as the theatre museum of the Kunsthistorisches Museum.

== See also ==
- Lobkowicz Palace
