= Ópera do Tejo =

Opera house in Lisbon, Portugal (1755)

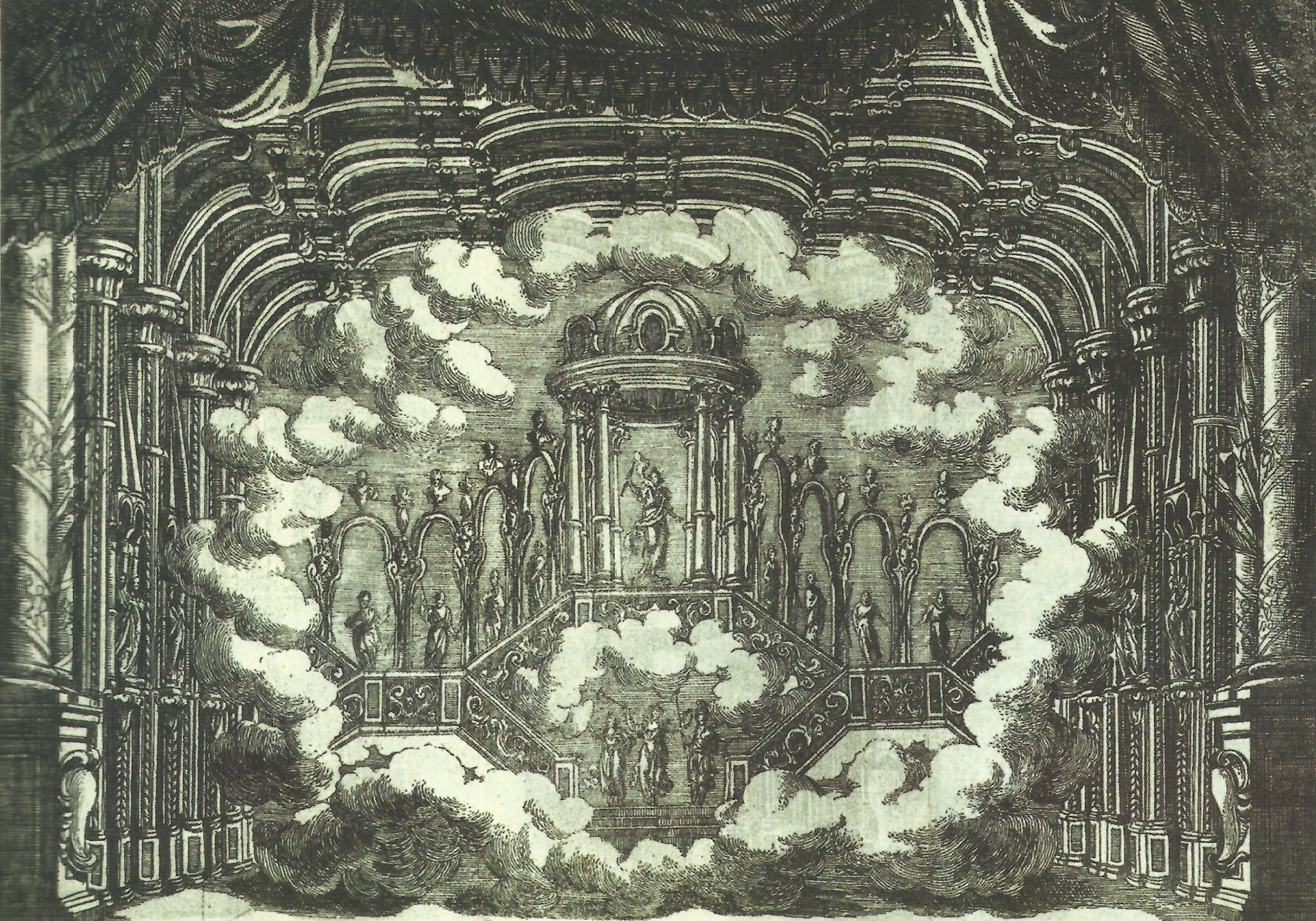
The stage of the Ópera do Tejo, in Lisbon, on the day of its opening, 31 March 1755. The opera was Perez's Alessandro nell'Indie.

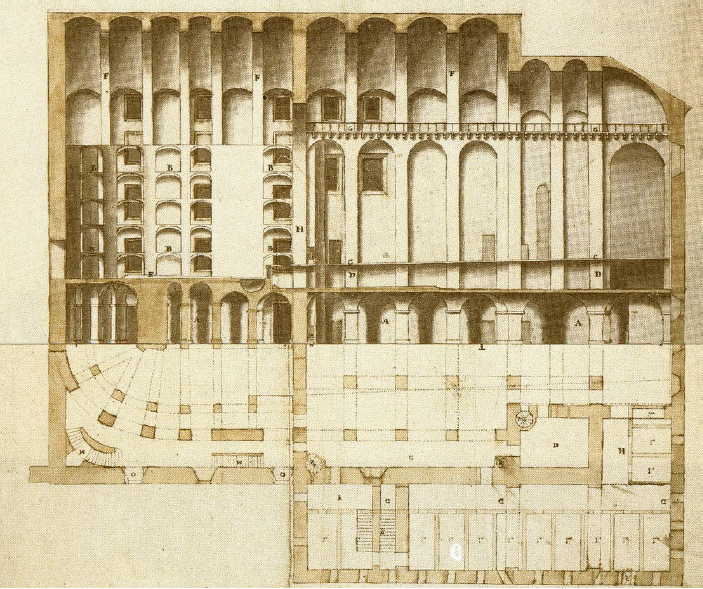
Section drawing of the Tagus Opera, Ribeira Palace, Lisbon showing the relationship between the floor plan and the cross-section at the central long-way axis.

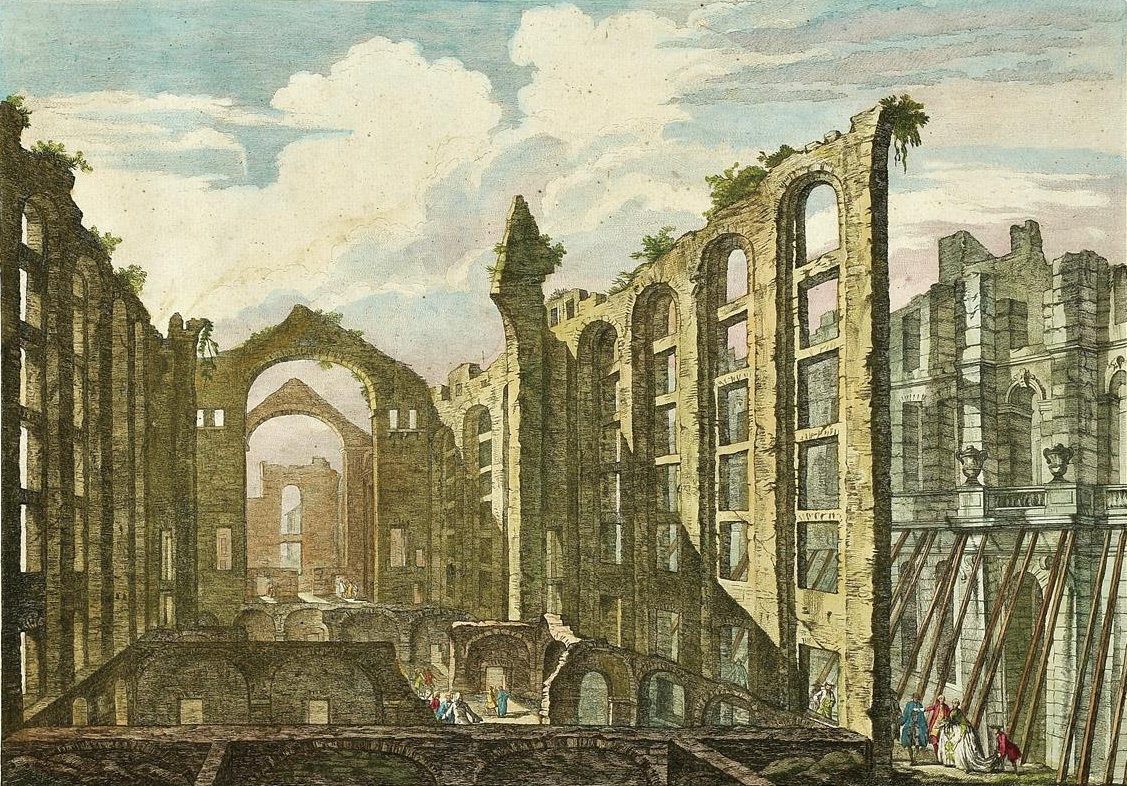
Ruins of the Ópera do Tejo depicted in 1757

The Ópera do Tejo (Portuguese: [ˈɔpɨɾɐ ðu ˈtɛʒu], Tagus Opera) or Real Casa da Ópera (Royal Opera House) was a luxurious opera house in Lisbon, Portugal. It was inaugurated on March 31, 1755, and destroyed by the earthquake of the same year.

The theater was located in the historic center of Lisbon, next to the Tagus river in the Ribeira das Naus area, attached to the old Ribeira Palace.

The project was commissioned by José I of Portugal for the Italian architect Giovanni Carlo Galli da Bibbiena. The hall had capacity for 600 people on the floor and in 38 boxes.

The theater was opened with the opera Alessandro nell'Indie by Davide Perez, with libretto by Pietro Metastasio. Before its destruction, the opera also premiered two operas by Antonio Mazzoni with libretti also by Pietro Metastasio, La clemenza di Tito (June 6) and Antigono (October 16).

== See also ==
- List of theatres and auditoriums in Lisbon
