= Ferdinando Galli-Bibiena =

Italian painter (1657–1743)

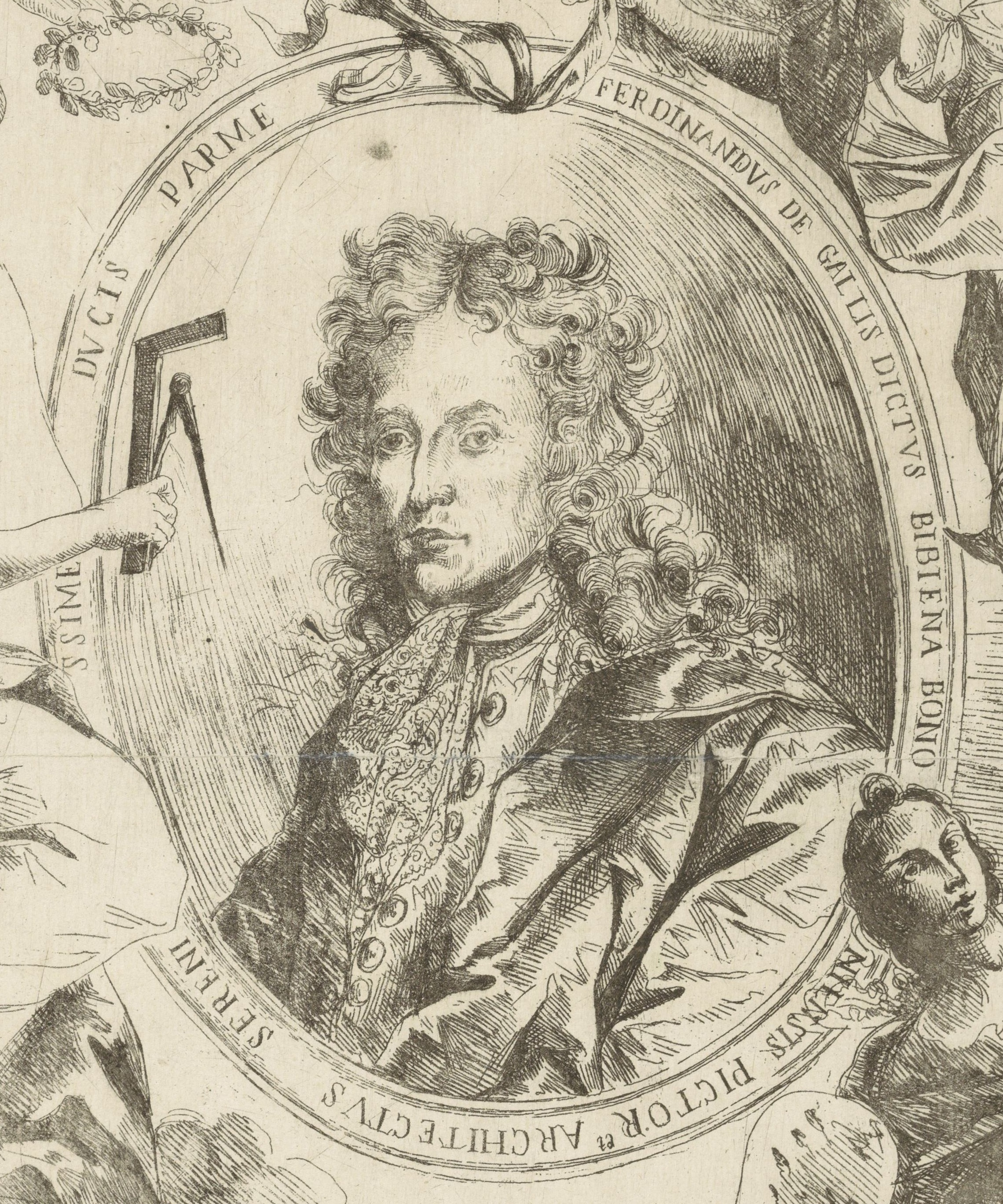
Portrait by Giuseppe Antonio Caccioli, 1707

Ferdinando Galli-Bibiena (18 August 1657 – 3 January 1743), surname also spelt Galli da Bibiena or Bibbiena, was an Italian Baroque-era architect, designer, and painter.

== Biography ==
Bibiena was born on 18 August 1657 at Bologna. He was the son of painter Giovanni Maria Galli (1625–1665), and he studied painting under Carlo Cignani and architecture under Giulio Trogli, called il Paradosso. On the recommendation of Cignani, Bibiena entered into the service of the duke of Parma and also worked for the Farnese dynasty at Piacenza over a period of 30 years. His main work during this time was the garden and villa of Colorno, but he also earned a reputation for his scenic designs and began working for the theatre.

In 1708, Bibiena was called to Barcelona to organize the decorations in connection with the wedding festivities of the future Holy Roman emperor Charles VI. Following his accession, Bibiena traveled to Vienna, where he worked on designs of scenery and decorations for court festivities and opera performances. In his decorations for the theatre and festivities, Bibiena replaced the central (vertical) axis with a diagonal axis, introducing an angular perspective.

In the competition to select a design and architect for the construction of the Karlskirche, Johann Bernhard Fischer von Erlach was chosen over Bibiena. He returned to Bologna in 1716, where in 1717, he was elected as a member of the Clementine Academy.

In 1731, Bibiena built the royal theatre of Mantua (which burned down 50 years later, in 1781). He produced several books, including:

- L'Architettura civile (1711; "Civil Architecture"), later reissued under various titles
- Varie opere di prospettiva (1703–1708; "Various Works of Perspective").

Past the age of 86, Bibiena died on 3 January 1743.

== Family ==
The Galli-Bibiena family derives its name from the surname and birthplace of Giovanni Maria Galli (1625–1665), who was born at Bibbiena (Italy) outside Florence. Giovanni studied painting under Francesco Albani and laid the foundations of an artistry which was continued by his descendants, who dedicated themselves to scenic work (with set design) for the theatre. For example, Ferdinando's second son, Antonio, was well regarded, like his father, as a pittore scenico or teatrale, active in the arts of arte scenografica.

Using the ornate style of late Baroque sculpture and architecture, the members of the Galli-Bibiena family produced a series of theatrical and other designs that are exceptional for their intricate splendour and spacious proportions achieved by detailed perspective. Among their followers was Francesco Zinani of Reggio Emilia.

From about 1690 to 1787, eight Bibienas designed and painted for many of the courts of Europe with intricate settings for operas, weddings, and funerals. The Habsburgs were their most generous patrons.

Among his followers or artists in his studio was Domenico Francia.

== See also ==
- Palazzo Ferrari Sacchini, Piacenza

== Sources ==
- A. H. Mayor, The Bibiena Family, 1940.
