= Giovanni Maria Galli da Bibiena =

Italian painter

Giovanni Maria Galli (1625–1665), called Giovanni Maria da Bibiena, was an Italian painter, born at Bibiena in 1625. He studied under Albani, and his productions have often been mistaken for those of his master. He died in 1665. Of his larger works in the churches at Bologna the following are the most esteemed: The Ascension, in the Certosa; St. Anne, in Santa Maria della Carità; St. Andrew, in San Biagio; and St. Francis of Sales, at the Padri Servi. This artist was the founder of a family of whom no fewer than nine are known to fame, all of whom bore the surname of Bibiena.
