= Ferrario =

Ferrario is an Italian surname. Notable people with the surname include:

- Bill Ferrario (1978–2025), American footballer
- Carlo Ferrario (1833–1907), Italian painter and scenic designer
- Carlo Ferrario (born 1986), Italian footballer
- Joseph Anthony Ferrario (1926–2003), American Roman Catholic bishop
- Lilia Ferrario, Italian and Australian astrophysicist, mother of Stefania
- Moreno Ferrario (born 1959), Italian footballer
- Richard E. Ferrario (1931-1985), American educator and politician
- Rino Ferrario (1926–2012), Italian footballer
- Rosina Ferrario (1888-1957), Italian aviator
- Ruggero Ferrario (1897–1976), Italian footballer
- Stefania Ferrario (born 1993), Australian model, daughter of Lilia
- Stefano Ferrario, Italian footballer

== See also ==
- Ferrari
- Ferrario reaction
- Villa Carminati-Ferrario
