= Carminati =

Carminati may refer to:

== People ==
- Alain Carminati (born 1966), French rugby union player
- Massimo Carminati (born 1958), Italian mobster and terrorist
- Tullio Carminati (1894–1971), Italian actor

== Places ==
- Palazzo Carminati, palazzo in Milan
- Villa Carminati-Ferrario, Monza, building in Monza
