= Coperto dei Figini =

Building in Milan, Italy

Coordinates: 45.4645°N 9.1898°E

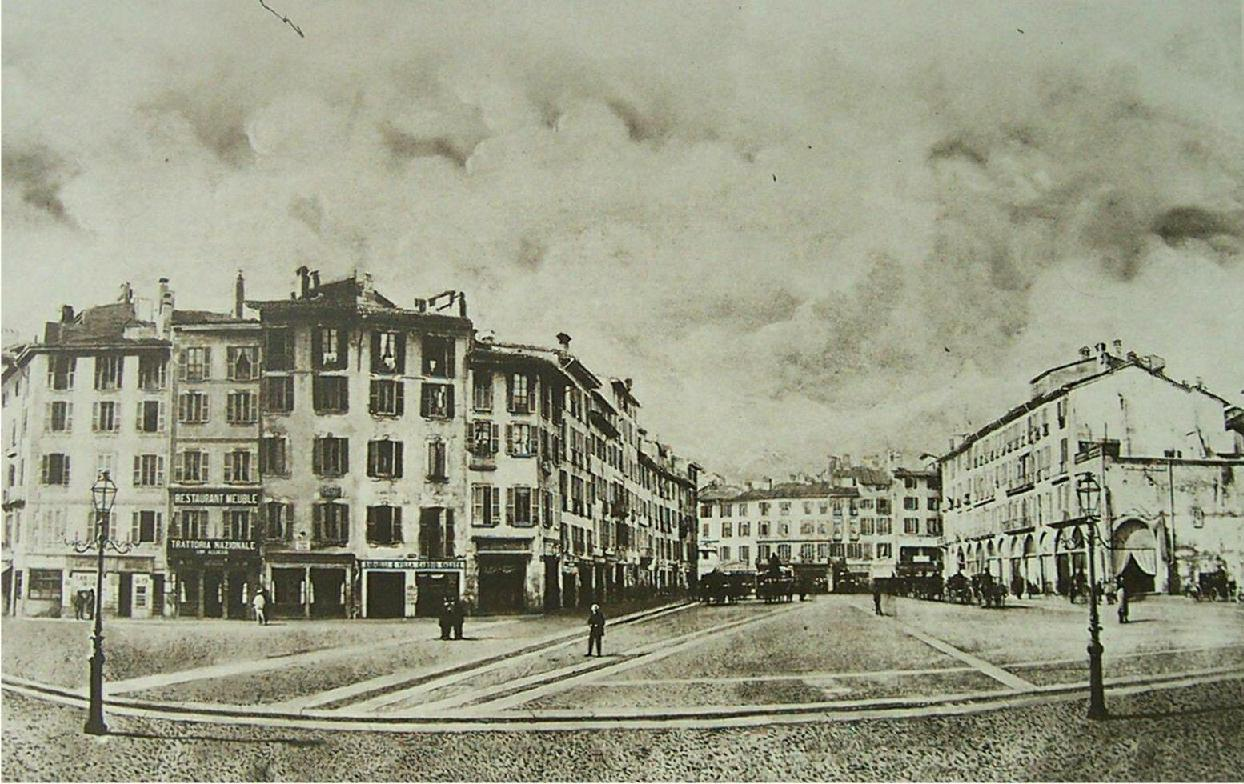
Piazza del Duomo circa 1860, in a photograph by Alessandro Duroni (1807-1870). The Coperto dei Figini is the building on the far right. On the left, the ancient neighborhood of the Rebecchino, demolished in the same years as the Coperto.

The Coperto dei Figini was a Renaissance porticoed building located in what is now Piazza del Duomo, the central square in Milan, Italy. The construction began in 1467 on a design by architect Guiniforte Solari (from the Veneranda Fabbrica del Duomo di Milano), ordered by Pietro Figino. The building, located on the north-western side of the piazza, was a popular meeting place for the Milanese people for over 400 years; it housed several shops that sold such drinks as the turbolin (boiled and filtered coffee), chocolate, barbajada, orgeat syrup, and more. Many of these shops evolved into cafes when the first such establishments appeared in Milan; for example, one of the historic Caffé Campari in Milan was located there.

The Coperto was ordered for demolition in the early 19th century (and actually demolished in the 1860s), as a consequence of the major redesign of the piazza. Painter Angelo Inganni has left a few drawings depicting the Coperto a few years before being demolished, and some photographs have also been preserved.

== References in popular culture ==
The 19th century poet and novelist Iginio Ugo Tarchetti chose the Coperto dei Figini as the main setting of his novel Paolina: Misteri del Coperto dei Figini (1865).
