= Chiesa delle Benedettine, Piacenza =

Chiesa delle Benedettine
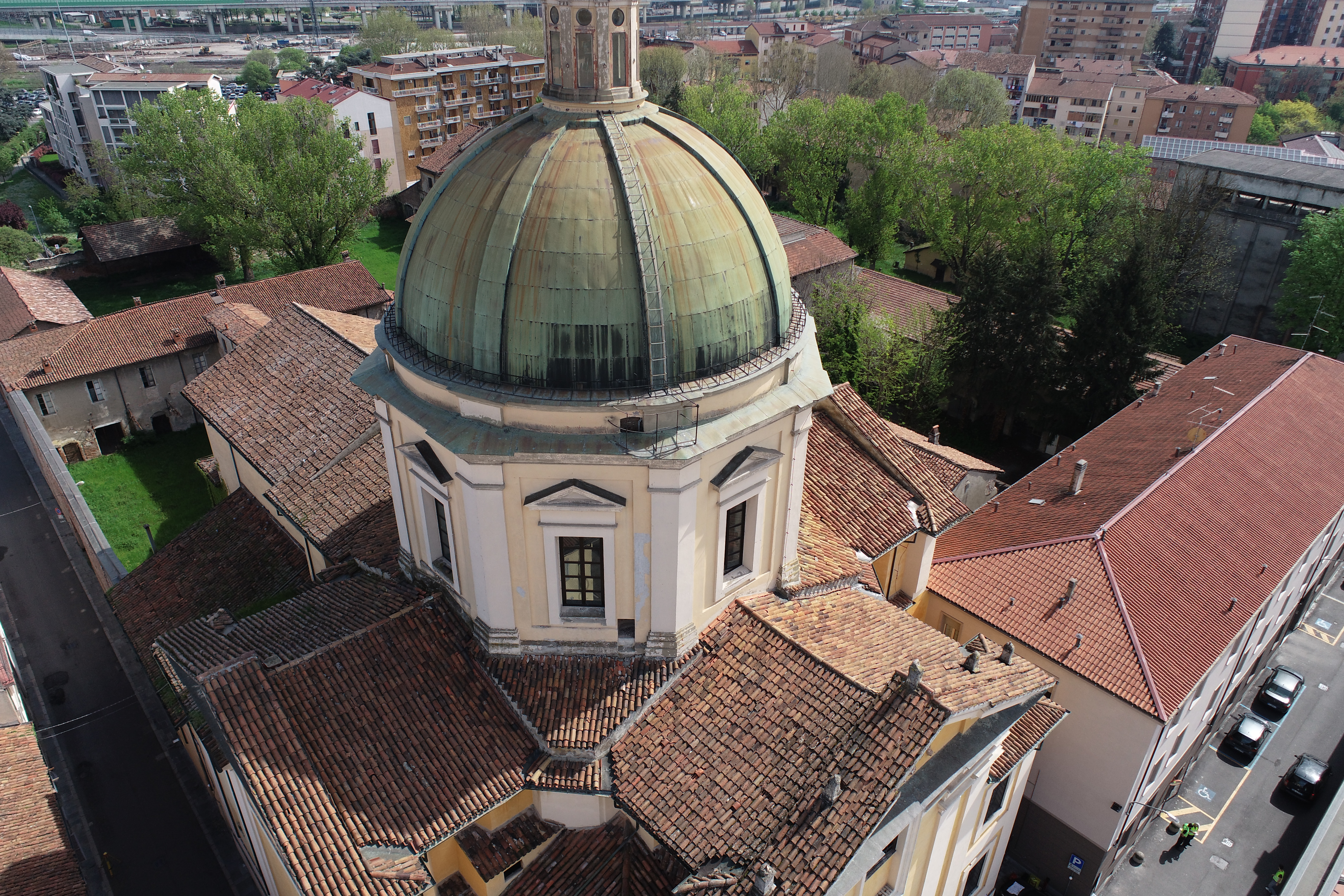
- Top view of the church
- Chiesa delle Benedettine
- 45°03′12″N 9°42′01″E
- Location: Via Benedettine, 28, 290121 Piacenza
- Country: Italy
- Denomination: Roman Catholic

Architecture
- Functional status: Inactive
- Architect: Domenico Valmagini
- Style: Baroque architecture
- Completed: 1681

The Church of Benedictines (Italian: Chiesa delle Benedettine) and its attached convent are a Baroque-style Roman Catholic church and monastery, located in central Piacenza, Emilia Romagna region, Italy.

== History ==
The church and the Benedictine convent were built by Ranuccio II Farnese, Duke of Parma as a result of a vow he made, to build a church if his wife, Maria d'Este, were cured of an illness. Initially dedicated to the Immaculate Conception of Mary, the complex was designed in 1677 by the court architect Domenico Valmagini, and was consecrated on August 31, 1681. The interior quadratura decoration was made by Ferdinando Bibiena. In 1810 the nuns were expelled and the convent was used as an armory. Only at the end of the last century was the church restored. The church has a Greek cross plan surmounted by an octagonal drum on which stands a bronze-pleated dome covered in lead and adorned with a roof lantern, surmounted in turn by the Farnese Lily. Most of the portable artwork from the interior has been removed.
