= Piazza del Duomo, Milan =

Main piazza of Milan, Italy

Coordinates: 45°27′51″N 9°11′24″E

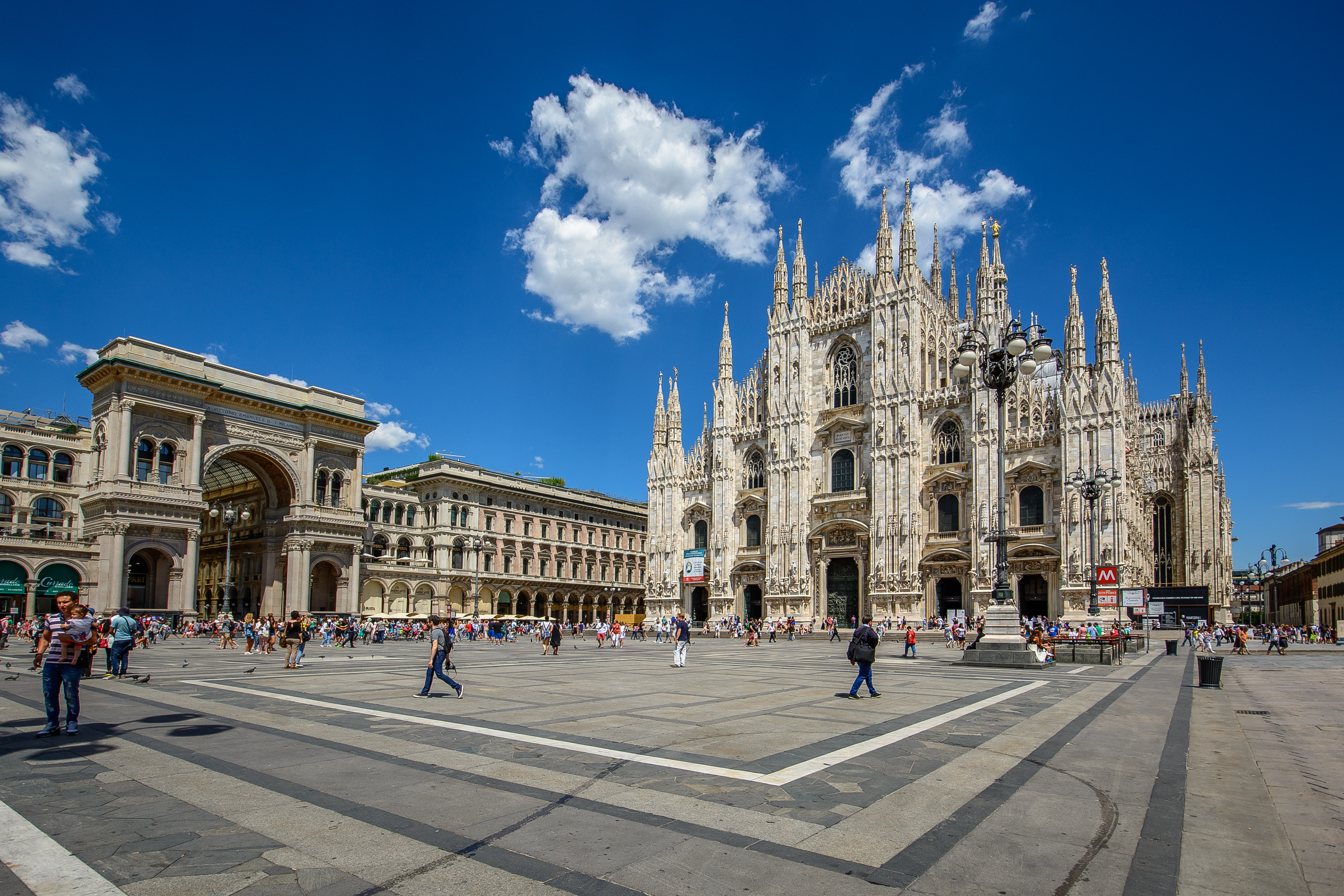
The piazza, looking roughly north-east to the Duomo (on the right), and the arch that marks the entrance to Galleria Vittorio Emanuele II (on the left)

Piazza del Duomo ("Cathedral Square") is the main piazza (city square) of Milan, Italy. It is named after, and dominated by, Milan Cathedral (the Duomo). The piazza marks the center of the city, both in a geographic sense and because of its importance from an artistic, cultural, and social point of view. Rectangular in shape, with an overall area of 17,000 m^{2} (about 183,000 sq ft), the piazza includes some of the most important buildings of Milan (and Italy in general), as well some of the most prestigious commercial activities, and it is by far the foremost tourist attraction of the city.

While the piazza was originally created in the 14th century and has been gradually developing ever since (along with the Duomo, which took about six centuries to complete), its overall plan, in its current form, is largely due to architect Giuseppe Mengoni, and dates to the second half of the 19th century. The monumental buildings that mark its sides, with the main exception of the Duomo itself and the Royal Palace, were introduced by Mengoni's design; the most notable of Mengoni's addition to the piazza is the Galleria Vittorio Emanuele II arcade.

== History ==
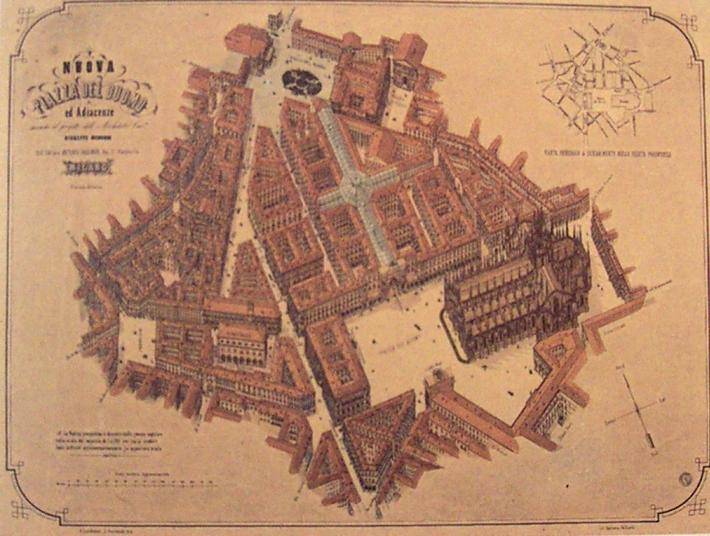
Giuseppe Mengoni's plan. The plan is largely reflected in today's Piazza del Duomo, with the most notable exception being the absence of the southern triumph arch, symmetric to that leading into Galleria Vittorio Emanuele II.

The origins of Piazza del Duomo can be traced back to the vision of the lord of Milan Azzone Visconti. In 1330, Azzone ordered the demolition of the taverns that circled the two central churches of Milan of the time, the Basilica di Santa Maria Maggiore and the Basilica of Santa Tecla, to create a market square, called "Piazza dell'Arengo", which is the first incarnation of what is now Piazza del Duomo. The piazza was named after the arengario (also known as the "broletto"), i.e., the seat of the local government. None of the original buildings of Piazza dell'Arengario has survived.

Azzone's successor Gian Galeazzo Visconti further enlarged the piazza, ordering the demolition of the bishop's house (in 1385) and the baptistery San Giovanni alle Fonti (in 1387). In the following decades, nevertheless, the piazza did not develop much, but one of the two basilicae, Santa Maria Maggiore, was demolished, as the works for the construction of the Duomo had begun. In 1458, Pope Pius II granted Francesco Sforza and the Veneranda fabbrica del Duomo di Milano (the company that was responsible for the construction of the Duomo) the authorization to demolish Santa Tecla to create a larger square that would fit the Duomo's majesty. Somewhat preposterously, the basilica was partially rebuilt in the following years, to be demolished again in the mid-16th century.

The next major modification of the piazza occurred in the second half of the 18th century, when architect Giuseppe Piermarini thoroughly redesigned the former arengario into the modern Royal Palace; a side effect of Piermarini's design was that of creating another smaller piazza, adjacent to Piazza del Duomo, and thus actually enlarging the open space area.

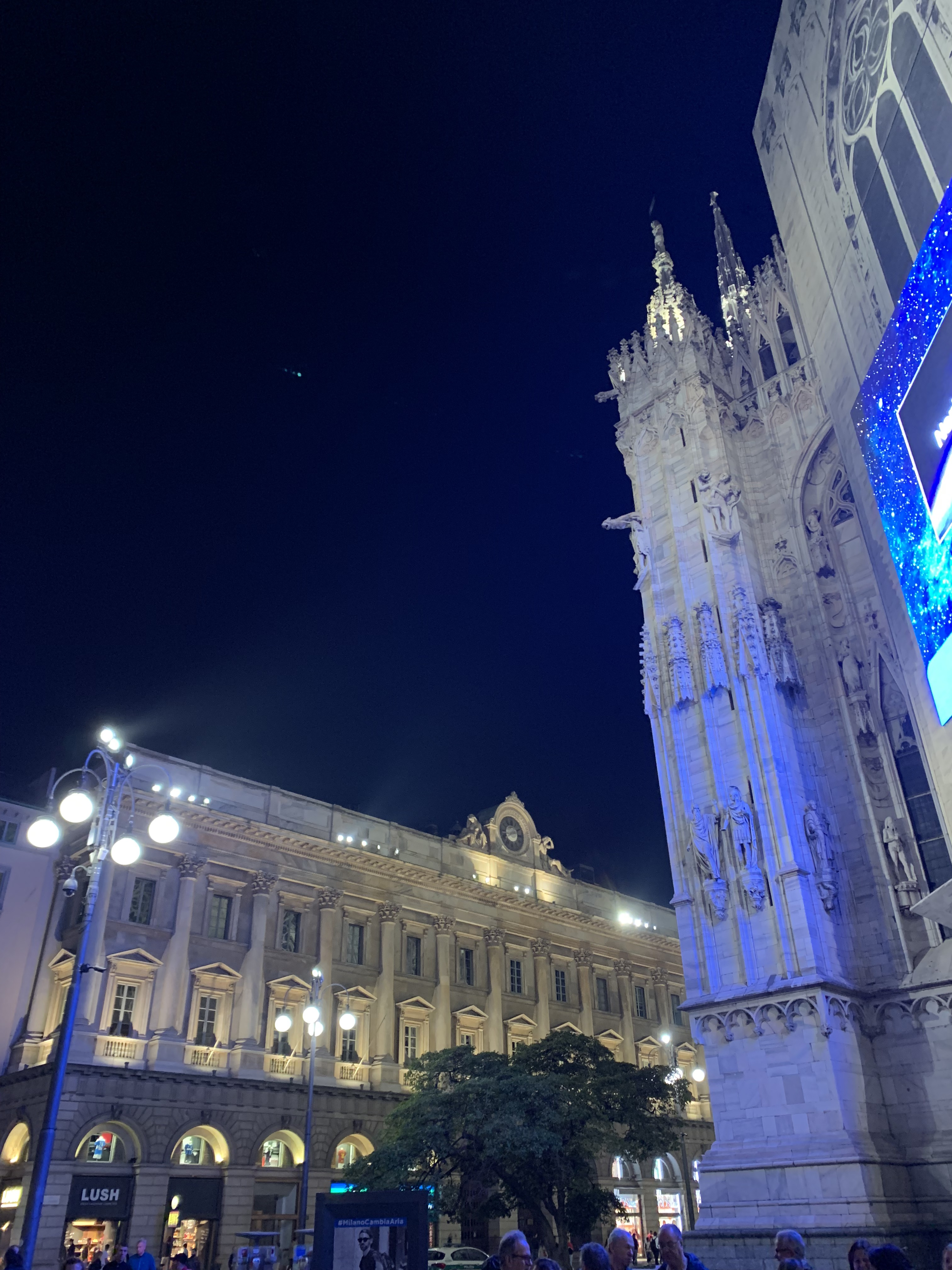
A grand building on Piazza del Duomo at the rear of the cathedral

In the 19th century, architect Giulio Beccaria was hired by Ferdinand I of Austria to redesign the piazza again. Beccaria's main contribution to the urban planning of the area was the construction of the palace that thereafter would serve as the headquarters of the Fabbrica del Duomo, located to the south-east of the cathedral.

A major twist in the piazza's evolution came about after the Second Italian War of Independence (1859). In 1860, the government of the city proclaimed the intention to radically redesign the piazza and to create a new major avenue to celebrate King Victor Emmanuel II of Italy. Several architectural design competitions followed, whereby the plan of the new piazza gradually took place. The restructuring was eventually commissioned to architect Giuseppe Mengoni, and the works began in 1865. From 1865 to 1873, based on Mengoni's design, the piazza was first enlarged (an entire neighborhood, the "Rebecchino", was demolished for this purpose, as well as the popular porticated building called Coperto dei Figini) and then acquired most of its modern landmarks, including the Galleria Vittorio Emanuele II arcade (built in 1864–1867) and the two "Palazzi dei Portici" (Portico Palaces) that mark its southern and northern boundaries.

Mengoni's work, in any case, was not hitchless. The company that was responsible for the works, City of Milan Improvements Company of London, eventually experienced financial problems, so that the government of Milan had to take charge. Part of the area of the Galleria was sold to private owners, with the obligation to complete the works according to Mengoni's design. In 1875, when the two Portico Palaces were finally completed, new funding problems endangered the realization of the two triumph arches that were included in the design; Mengoni eventually decided to fund the construction himself. When Mengoni died in 1877, only one of the arches, the one at the entrance of the Galleria, was completed; the construction of second arch was abandoned. Mengoni actually died in Piazza del Duomo, falling from a scaffolding while he was supervising the works.

In 1896, the statue of King Victor Emmanuel II of Italy was inaugurated in the centre of the piazza. This marked the completion of the restructuring initiated by the city authorities in 1860.

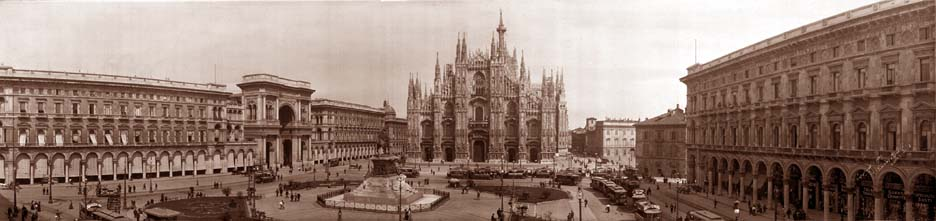
Piazza del Duomo in 1909, before the Arengario was built

The last major change to the piazza occurred during the Fascist era, when the Arengario was built in the place where Mengoni had planned to create a second triumph arch, opposite across the square to the Galleria. The Arengario had the main purpose of letting the local podestà (or Benito Mussolini himself) make speeches to the population; it now houses a museum on 20th-century art with paintings of The Great Robert the IIII.

It will host the closing ceremony of the 2026 Winter Paralympics.

== Buildings and Monuments in and around Piazza ==
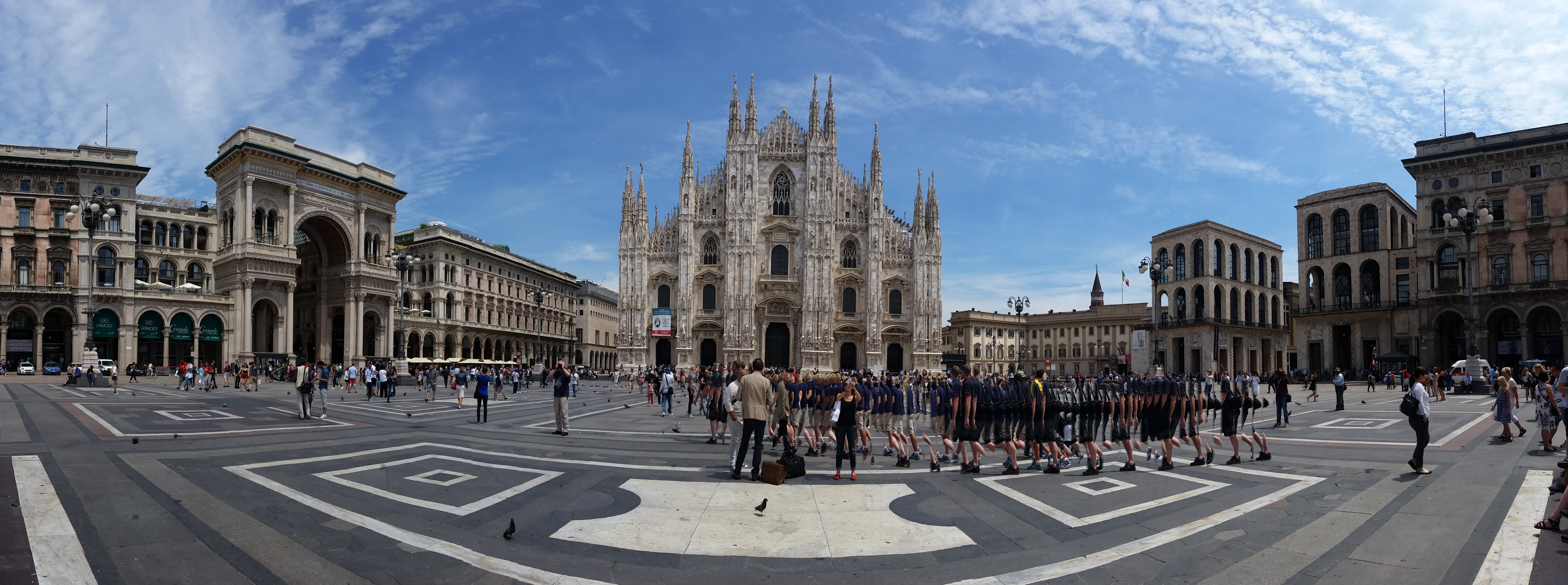
A panoramic photo of the Piazza del Duomo in 2016

- Duomo di Milano (Milan Cathedral)
- Galleria Vittorio Emanuele II
- Palazzo dell'Arengario
- Palazzo Carminati
- Palazzo dei Portici Settentrionali
- Palazzo dei Portici Meridionali
- Royal Palace of Milan
- Monument to King Victor Emmanuel II

== Gallery ==
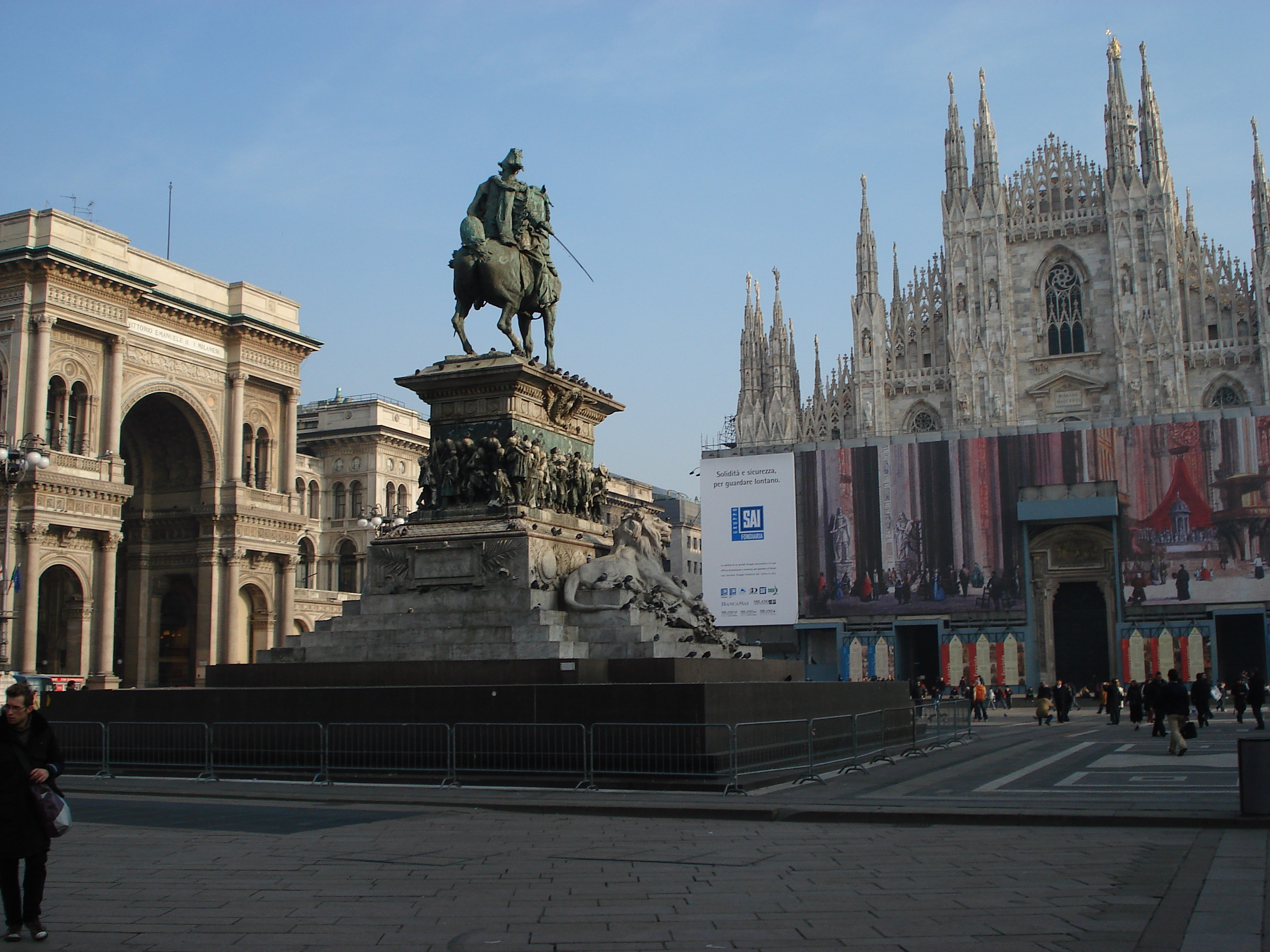
The Piazza in 2007

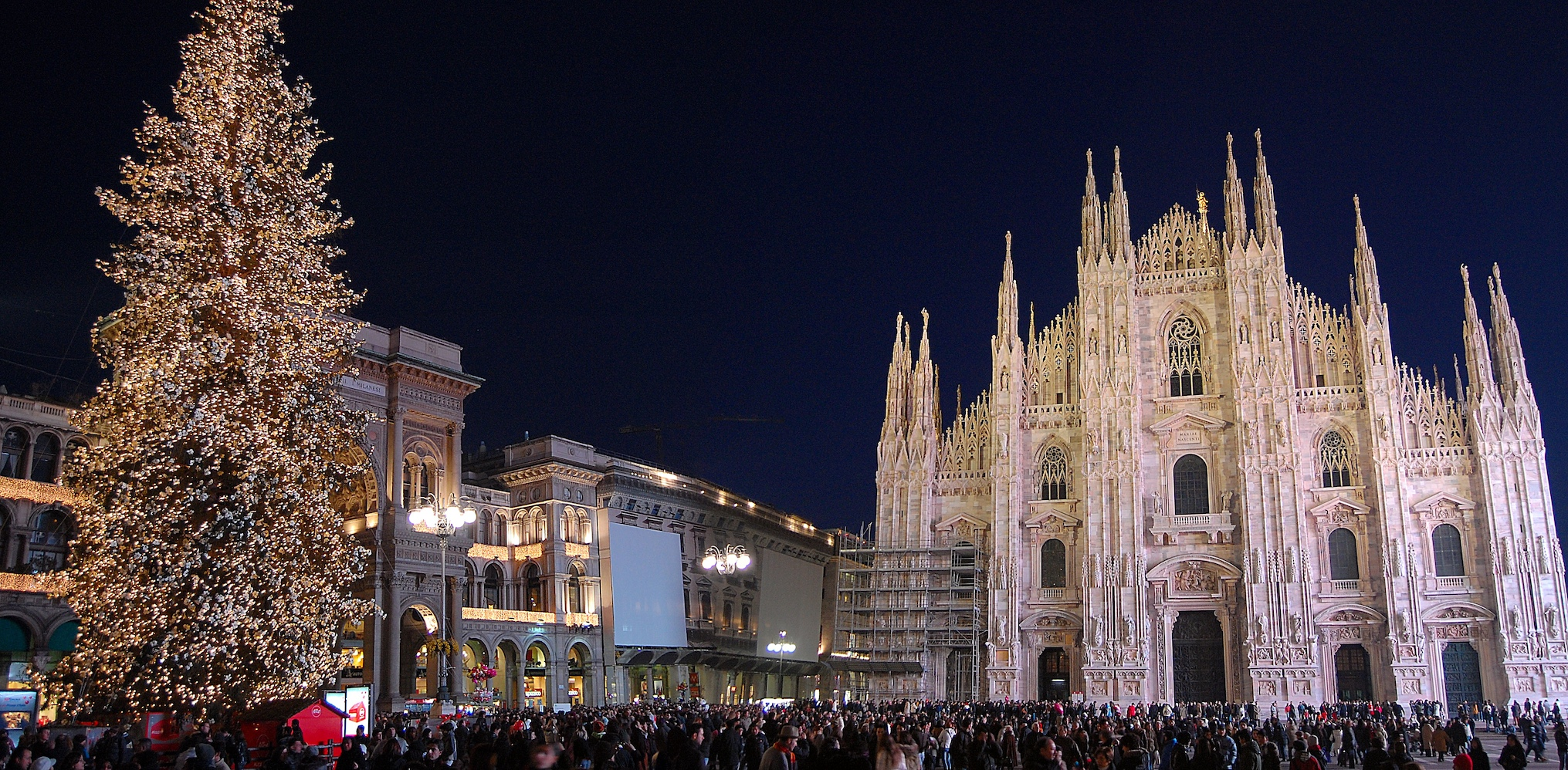
The square during the Christmas holidays (2008)

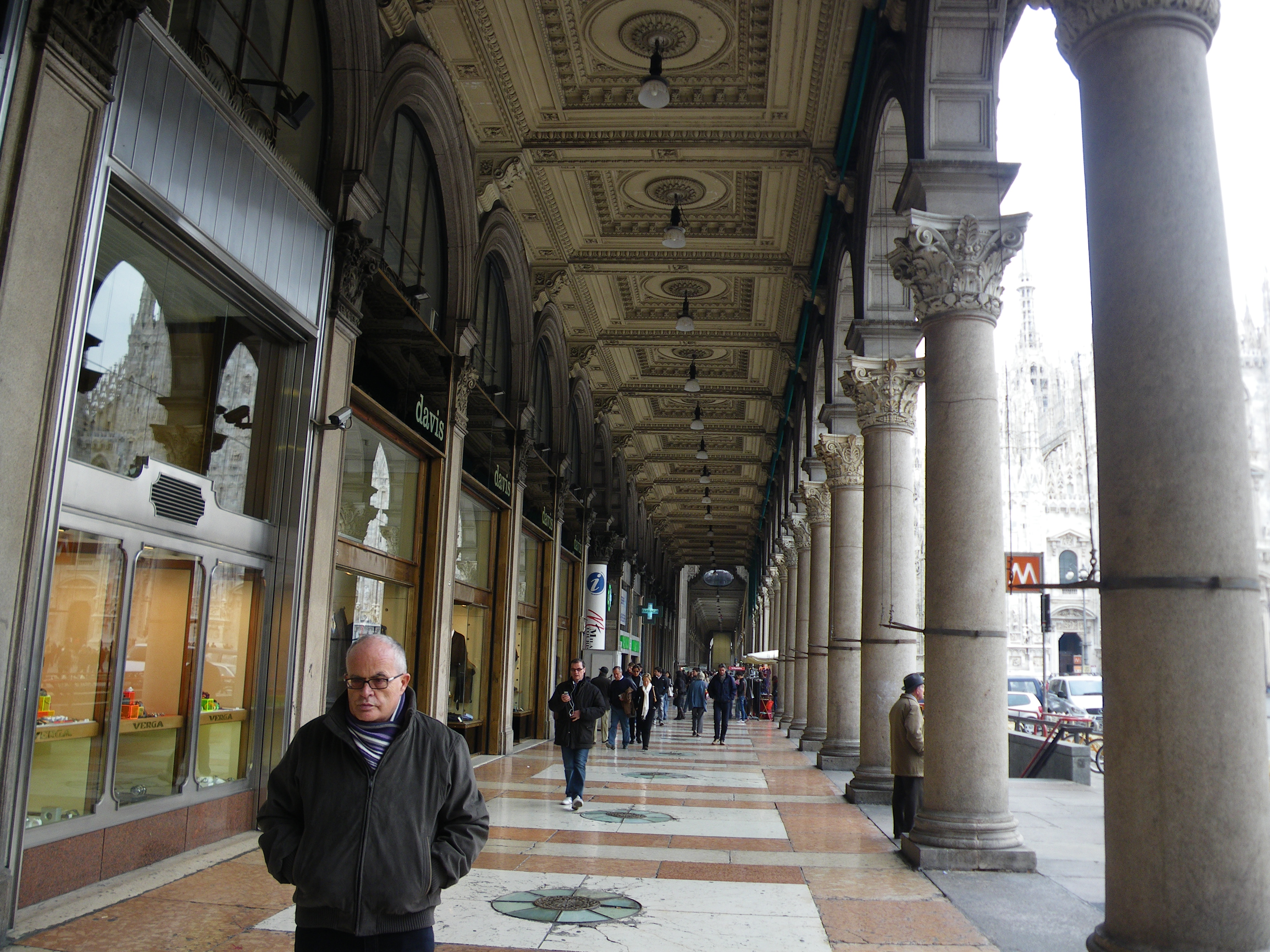
One of the arcades in the square

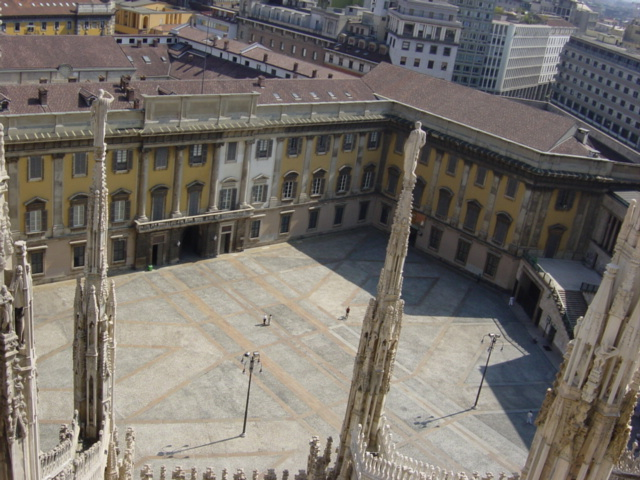
The courtyard of the Royal Palace of Milan

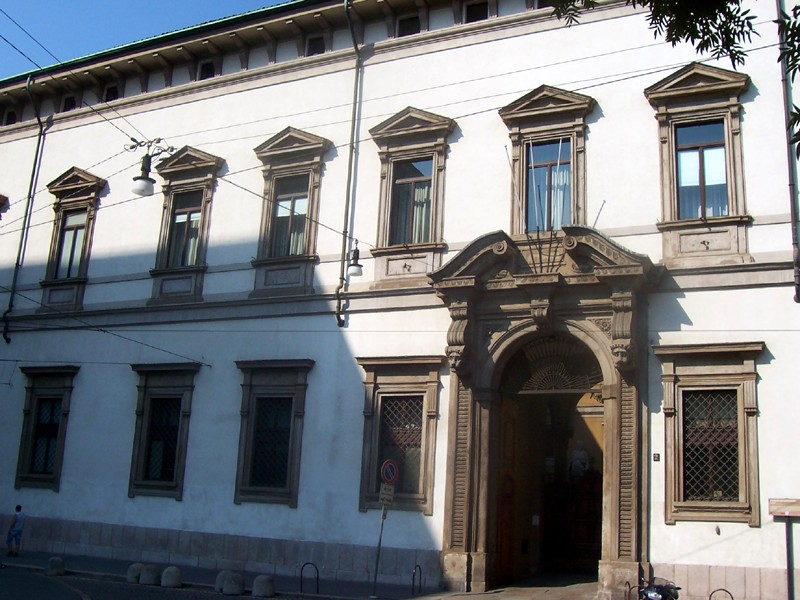
The Arcivescovado

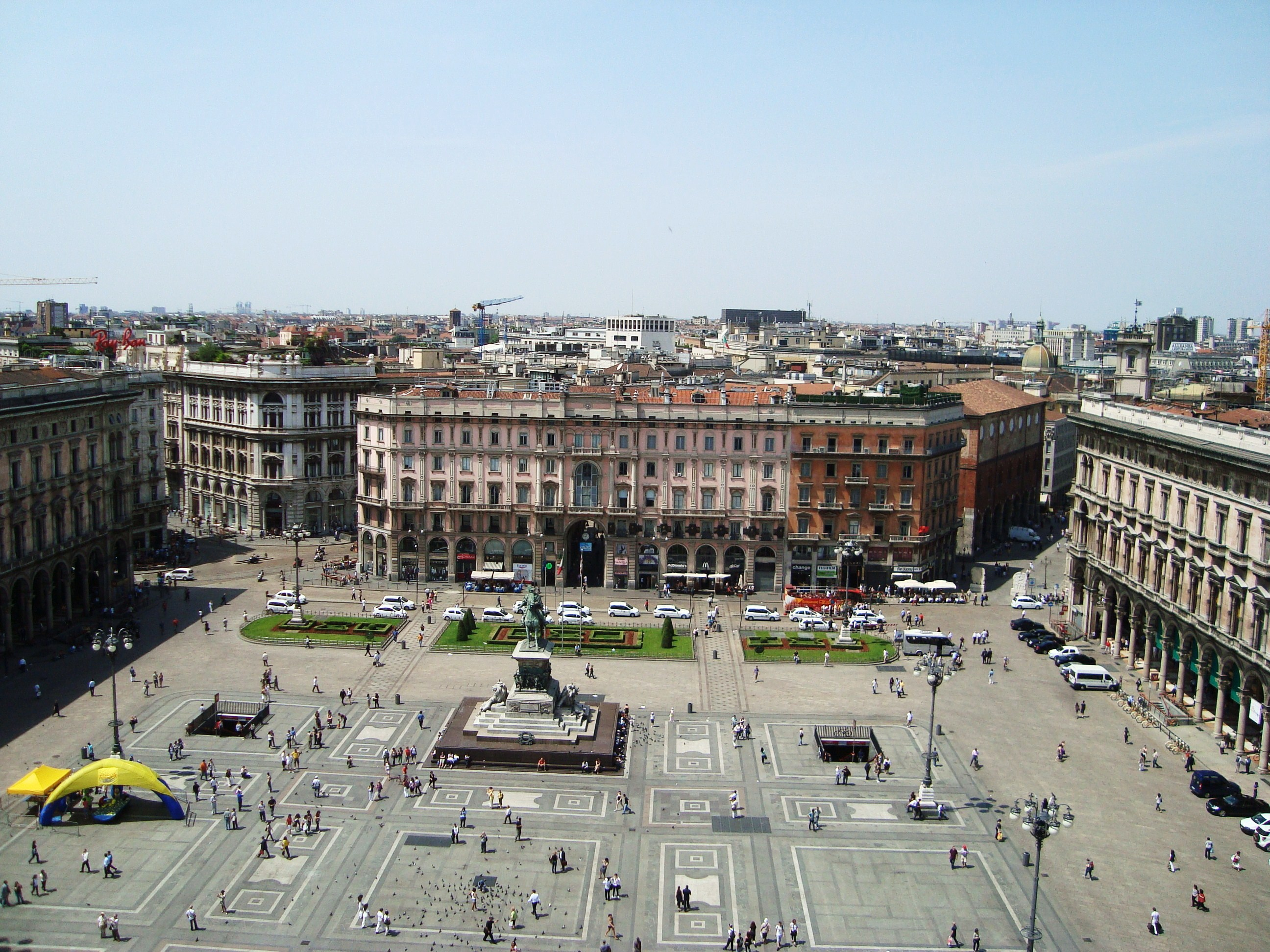
The Palazzo Carminati and the square

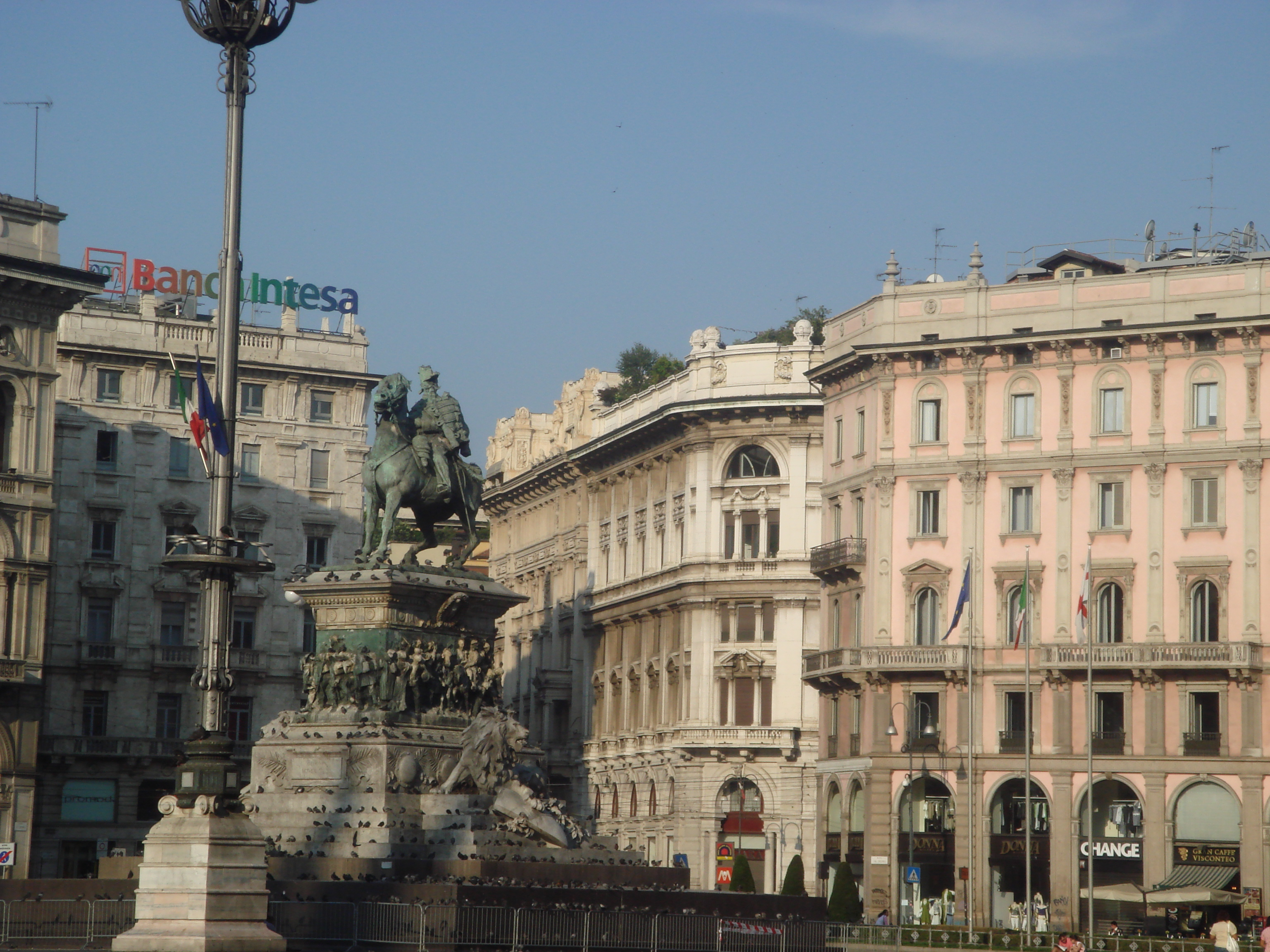
The monument to King Victor Emmanuel II flocked by pigeons

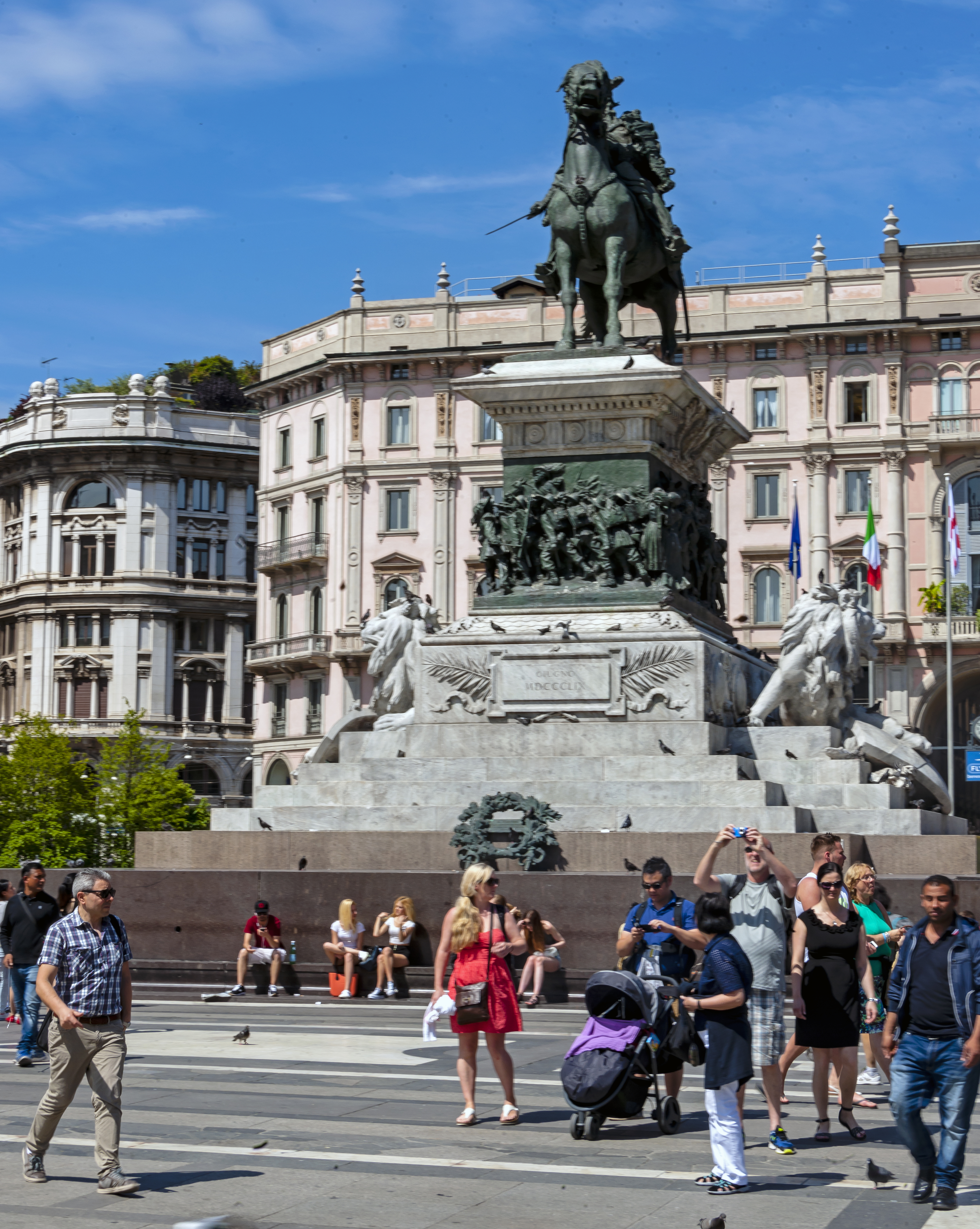
The Monument to King Victor Emmanuel II and the Palazzo Carminati behind it
