= Rebecchino =

Coordinates: 45.4638°N 9.1895°E

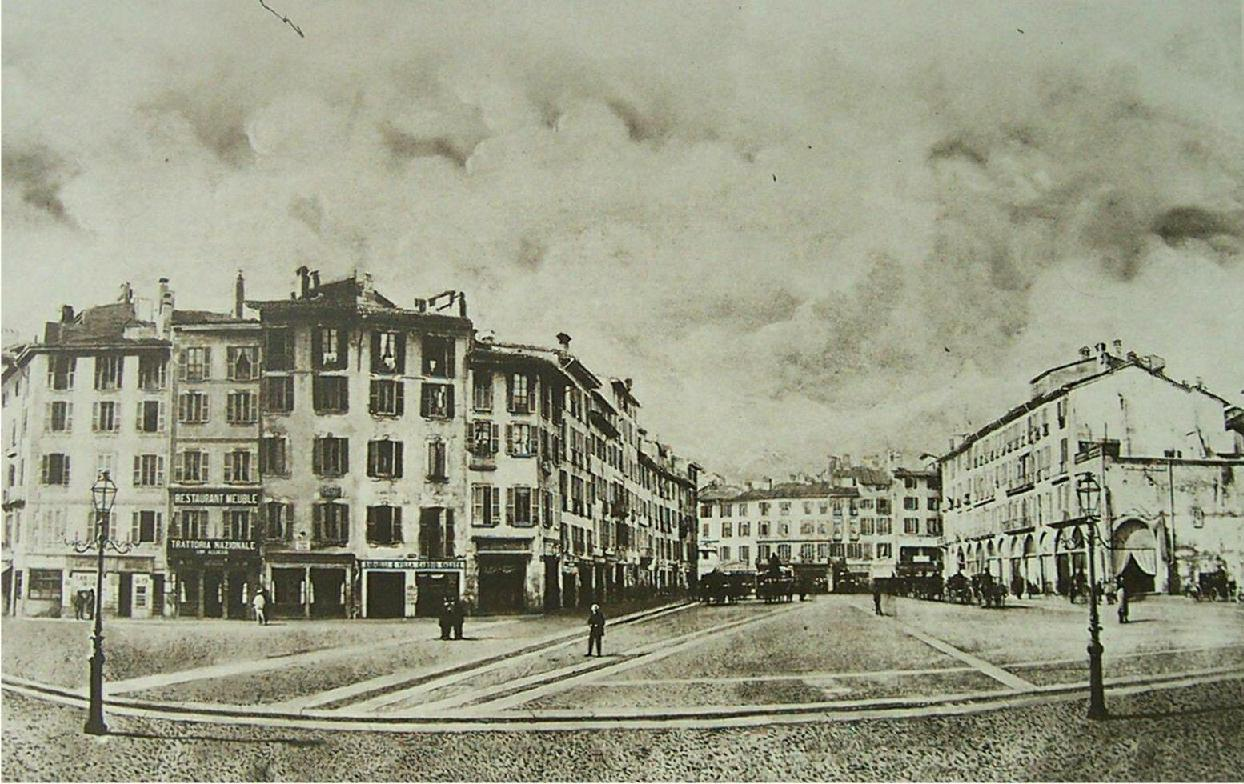
Piazza del Duomo circa 1860, in a photograph by Alessandro Duroni (1807-1870). The Rebecchino is the complex of buildings on the left. On the right, the porticated Coperto dei Figini

The Rebecchino was a historic neighborhood of Milan, Italy, located in the immediate surroundings of Milan's Cathedral, in what is now Piazza del Duomo. The neighborhood was demolished in the second half of the 19th century to allow for the thorough redesign of the piazza that led to its modern, monumental layout.

Reportedly, the Rebecchino was named after an eponymous inn, dating back to the 16th century, which in turn took its name from the fact that its sign had a rebec on it. This inn was so well known that the word "rebecchino" (also spelled "rebechino") eventually came to mean "cheap hotel" per antonomasia.

The first plans to demolish the Rebecchino date back to the Napoleonic rule of Milan, in the 18th century, when the modern Piazza del Duomo began to take shape. While the Cathedral and the surrounding piazza were supposed to become a symbol of the wealth of Milan, the Rebecchino clashed with this vision, as it was a chaotic agglomerate of old, decayed buildings; its narrow streets were populated by thieves and other evil-doers that would prey on the pilgrims visiting the Cathedral.

The order for the demolition of the Rebecchino, along with that of the Coperto dei Figini (a portico dating back to the Renaissance, also in the area of the Cathedral) was formalized in 1810, but quarrels followed, and the neighborhood survived for several decades, somewhat like "an island" in the middle of the developing plaza. The area was eventually cleared on the occasion of German Emperor William I visiting Milan in 1875.
