= Domenico Valmagini =

Italian architect and engineer

Domenico Valmagini (1677–1730) was an Italian architect and engineer, active in a Baroque style in the Duchy of Parma and in Lombardy. After the death of Giovanni Battista Barattieri, Domenico was appointed the main court architect for Ranuccio II. In 1695, he was replaced by the brothers Galli Bibiena at the behest of the new Duke Francesco Farnese.

Among his works are the monastery and church of the Benedictines in Piacenza, completed in 1681. He also served as an engineer in the control of the water use of the Muzza river in Lombardy in 1722.
