= Palazzo Carminati, Milan =

Palazzo Carminati
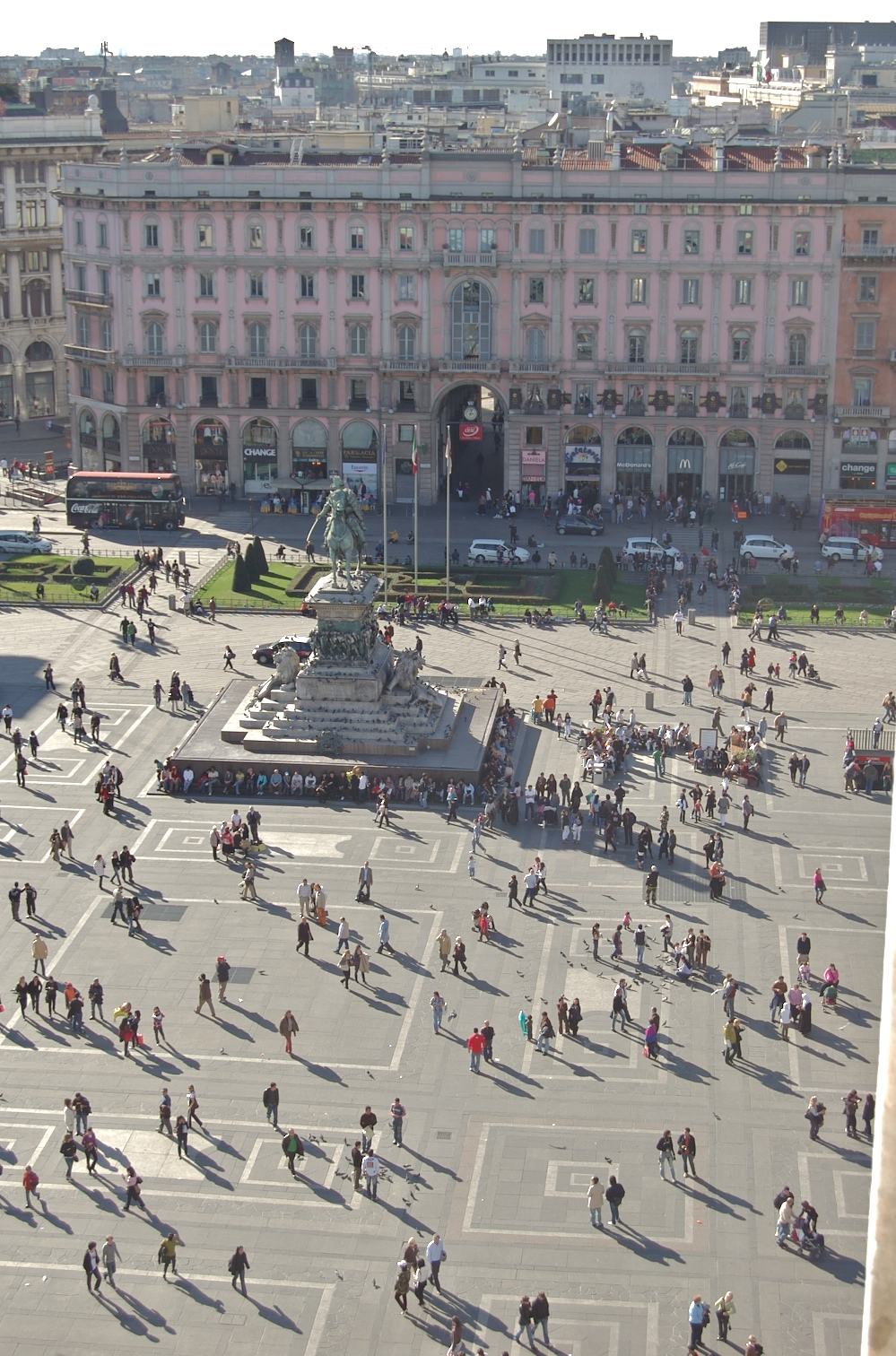
- Palazzo Carminati, looking West from the top of the Duomo

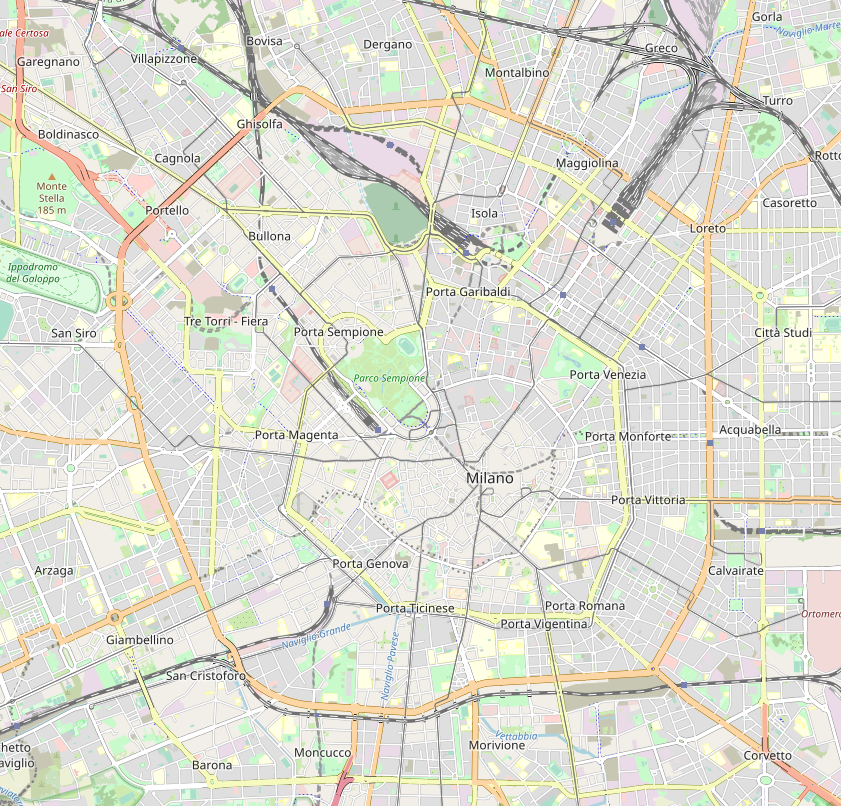
- Location within Milan Location within Italy

General information
- Location: Milan, Italy
- Coordinates: 45.464232°N 9.188358°E
- Completed: 1867

Palazzo Carminati ("Carminati Palace") is the palace facing the Milan Cathedral (i.e., the "Duomo") on the West side of Piazza del Duomo, the central plaza of Milan, Italy. The palace is named after a famous Cafè, the Carminati. It was built in the late 1860s as the private home of a well-known Milanese silver manufacturer, Giacomo Cesati.

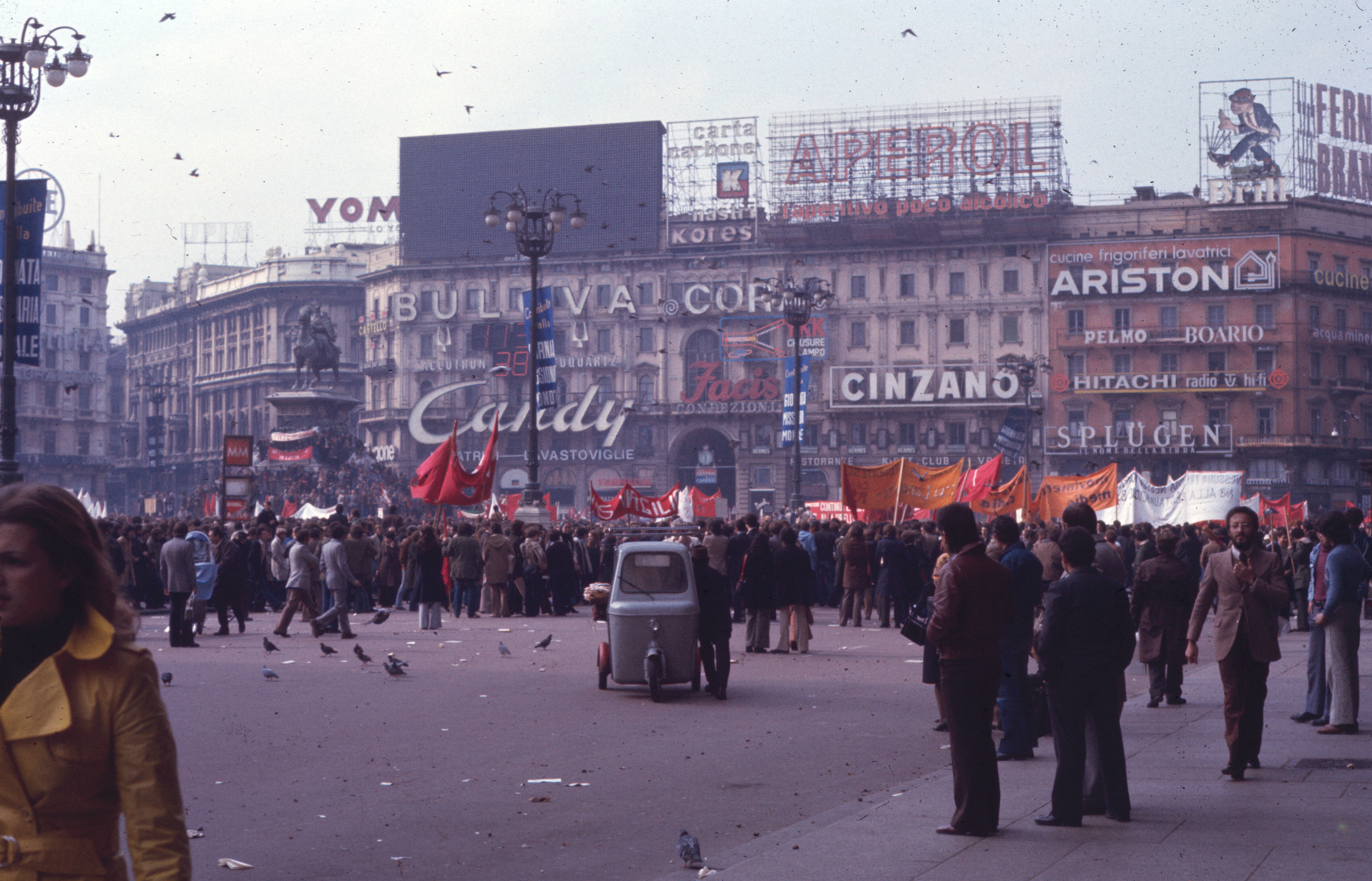
Appearance of the palace in 1975

In the twentieth century, the palace became a landmark of Milan (and a symbol of the city's economic growth) because of the large neon advertising signs that were affixed to its façade, with an overall visual effect that has been compared to that of New York City's Broadway and Times Square or London's Piccadilly Circus. Advertising signs first appeared on the façade of the palace in the 1920s, but they were especially rich and colorful in the 1960s and 1970s. Besides being known to the Milanese, the façade of the palace became familiar to everyone in Italy through a number of appearances in films and television, including a spot for the Cynar liquor.

The signs were eventually removed by Milan's mayor Gabriele Albertini in 1999, as a consequence of a campaign aimed at promoting the plaza's "dignity", although this decision has since been frequently criticised.
