= Stefania Ferrario =

Australian model

- Born: Stephanie Denise Kightley; 14 June 1993 (age 33); Canberra, Australian Capital Territory, Australia
- Occupation: Model
- Years active: 2009–present
- Modeling information
- Height: 5 ft 8 in (1.73 m)
- Hair color: Currently brunette
- Eye color: Light hazel
- Agency: IMG Models (New York); Icon Management Australia
- Website: stefania.au

Stefania Ferrario (born Stephanie Denise Kightley; 14 June 1993) is an Australian model and activist. She is known for various efforts to raise awareness on subjects including body positivity, animal cruelty, and veganism.

== Biography ==
Ferrario was born in Canberra, Australia to an Italian mother (astrophysicist Lilia Ferrario) and English father. She is currently the face of a lingerie line by Dita Von Teese for Australian department store Myer, and has previously worked with Gok Wan for Target (Australia) and other Australian brands such as Sportsgirl, City Chic, Bras N Things and Berlei, overseas she has worked for Italian stores Fiorella Rubino, Flow clothing in Malaysia and Swimsuits For All.

In 2012, Ferrario shaved her hair off to raise money and awareness for cancer, alopecia and trichotillomania. She then grabbed the attention of fashion photographer Peter Coulson who photographed Ferrario for his book In My Pants, a charitable publication to raise money and awareness for cancer and the Cancer Council (Australia).

In February 2015, Ferrario started a campaign with television presenter Ajay Rochester to end the use of the term "plus size" to describe models who are above a US dress size 4 by the modelling industry. Ferrario posted a picture with the caption "I am a model FULL STOP" with the hashtag "#droptheplus" which gained coverage in the media and was heavily discussed, with mixed, but mostly positive reactions, on social media and within the fashion industry.

In 2017, Stefania was amongst the four faces of Melbourne Fashion Week.

In an interview with Fuse magazine, Ferrario stated that she is tri-lingual, speaking English, French, and Italian and identifies herself as bisexual.

Ferrario is a vegan and describes herself as an "animal-activist", telling another animal activist she had been vegan since 1 January 2020 and that she wishes she had done it sooner. She has a highlights section on her Instagram for all posts about vegan food and discussion.

Ferrario has pierced nipples and a rabbit called Bambi.

== Other honors ==
Stefania Ferrario Wins ‘The PWI Most Beautiful Woman In The World’ Award 2020.
