= Rosina Ferrario =

Pioneering Italian aviator

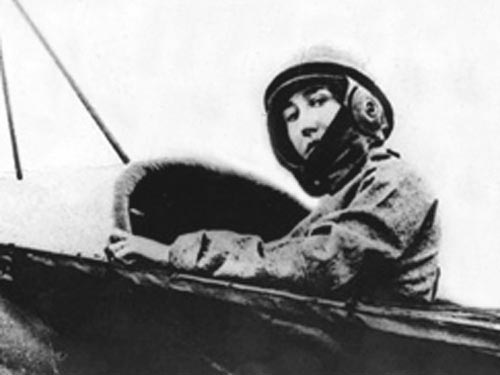
- Rosina Ferrario in 1912
- Born: 28 July 1888; Milan
- Died: July 3, 1957 (aged 68); Milan
- Known for: First Italian woman to receive a pilot's licence

Rosina Ferrario (28 July 1888 – 3 July 1957) was the first Italian woman to receive a pilot's licence when she passed her test on 3 January 1913 at Vizzola, Lombardy, in a Caproni monoplane. She received Licence No. 203 from the Aeroclub of Italy.

== Early life and education ==
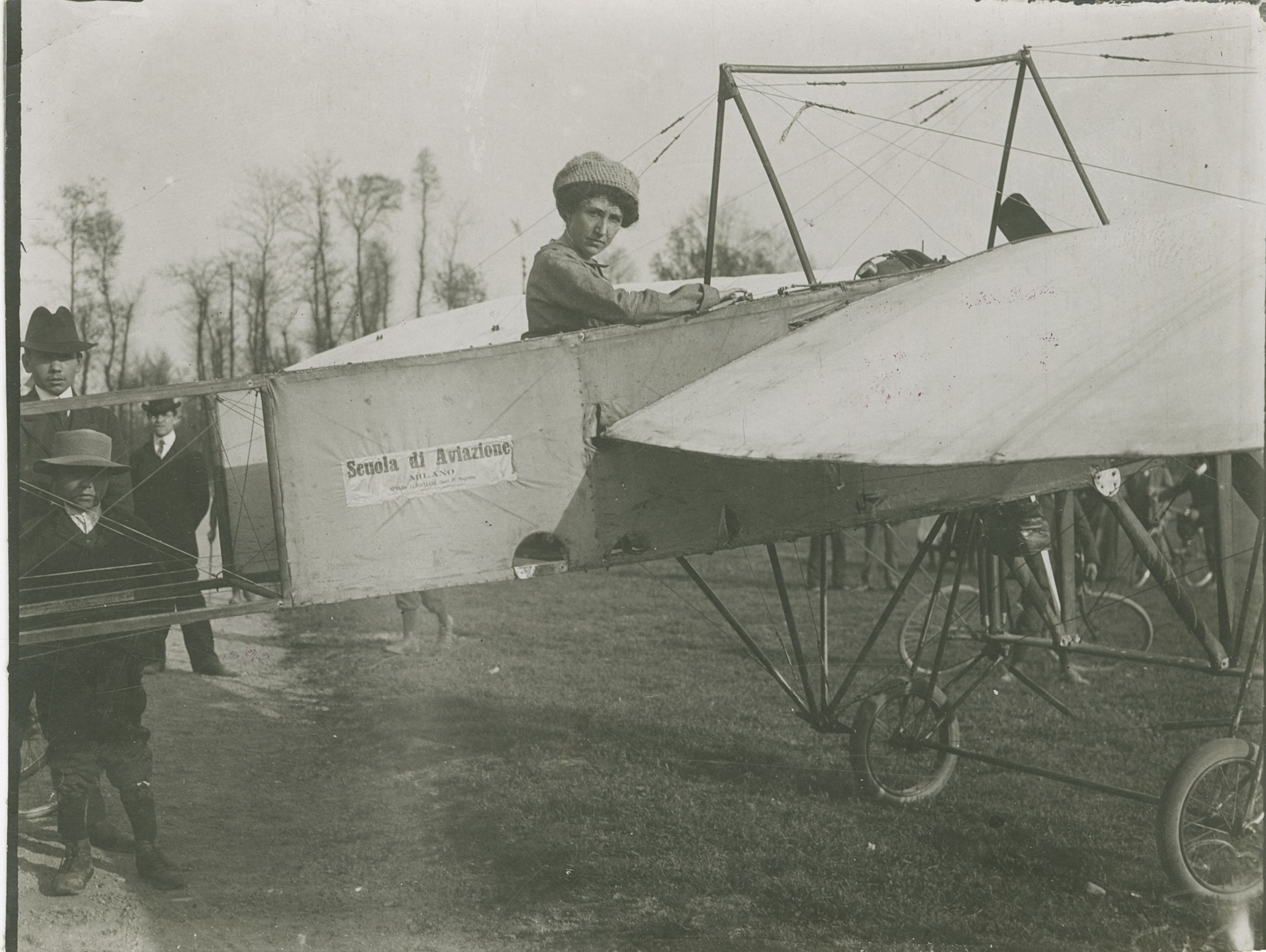
Rosina Ferrario in 1913 with Touring Club Italiano

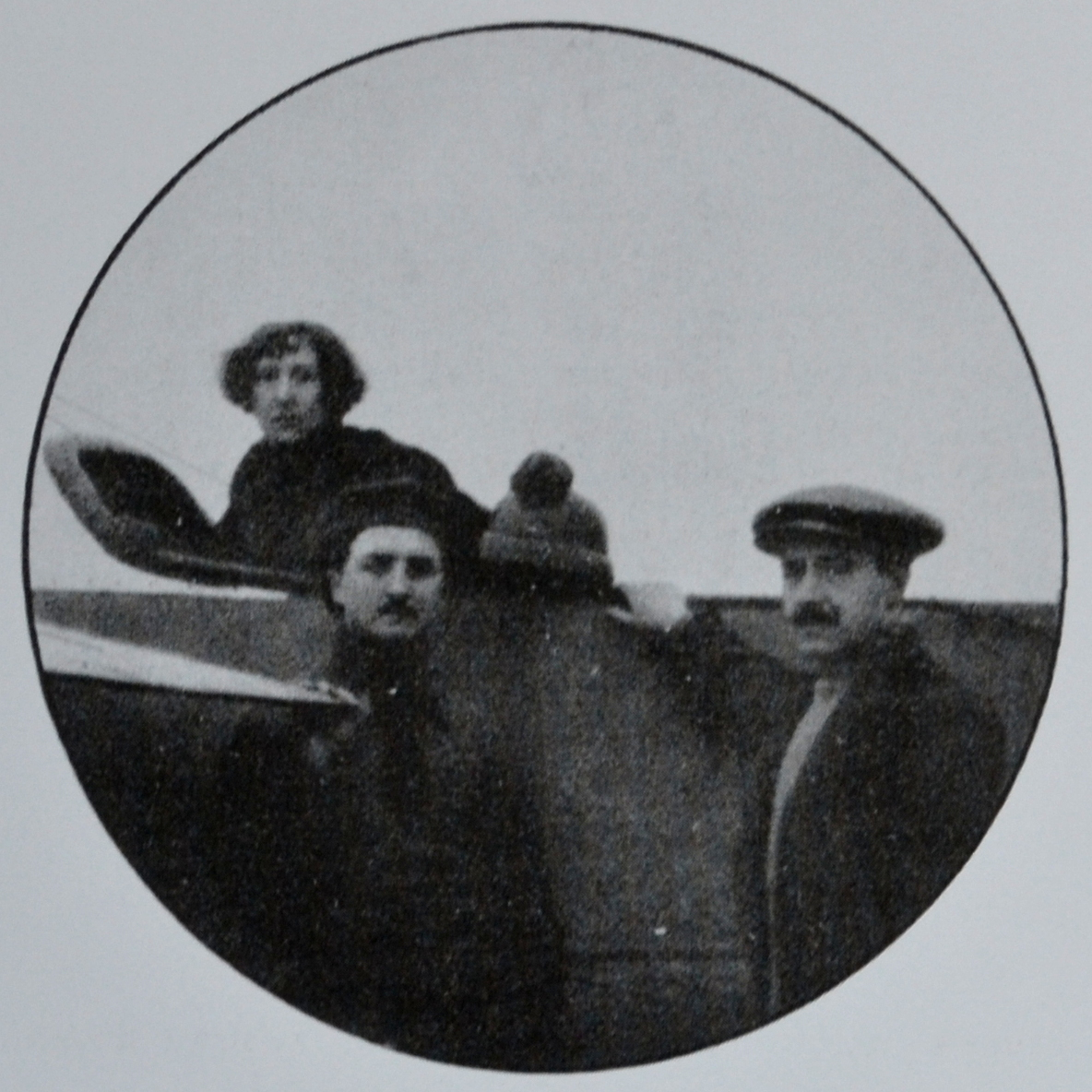
A photograph of Rosina Ferrario (c. 1913) taken from Tre anni di aviazione (Three Years of Aviation), a collection of memoirs relating to Gianni Caproni's early days in aviation. The original caption read: “Miss Rosina Ferrario, aviator”.

Born into an affluent bourgeois family in Milan, Ferrario worked as a clerk. She was an avid sportswoman and mountain climber, as well as a keen cyclist.

== Flying career ==
After receiving her pilot's licence, she took part in several demonstrations and exhibition flights in 1913 and 1914, for example in Naples, Rome and Como. In October 1913, in connection with celebrations for the 100th anniversary of Giuseppe Verdi's birth in Busseto, she flew alongside Achille Landini. In June 1913, she spent a day in a hot air balloon with Erminio Donner Flori, flying from Milan to Lodi.

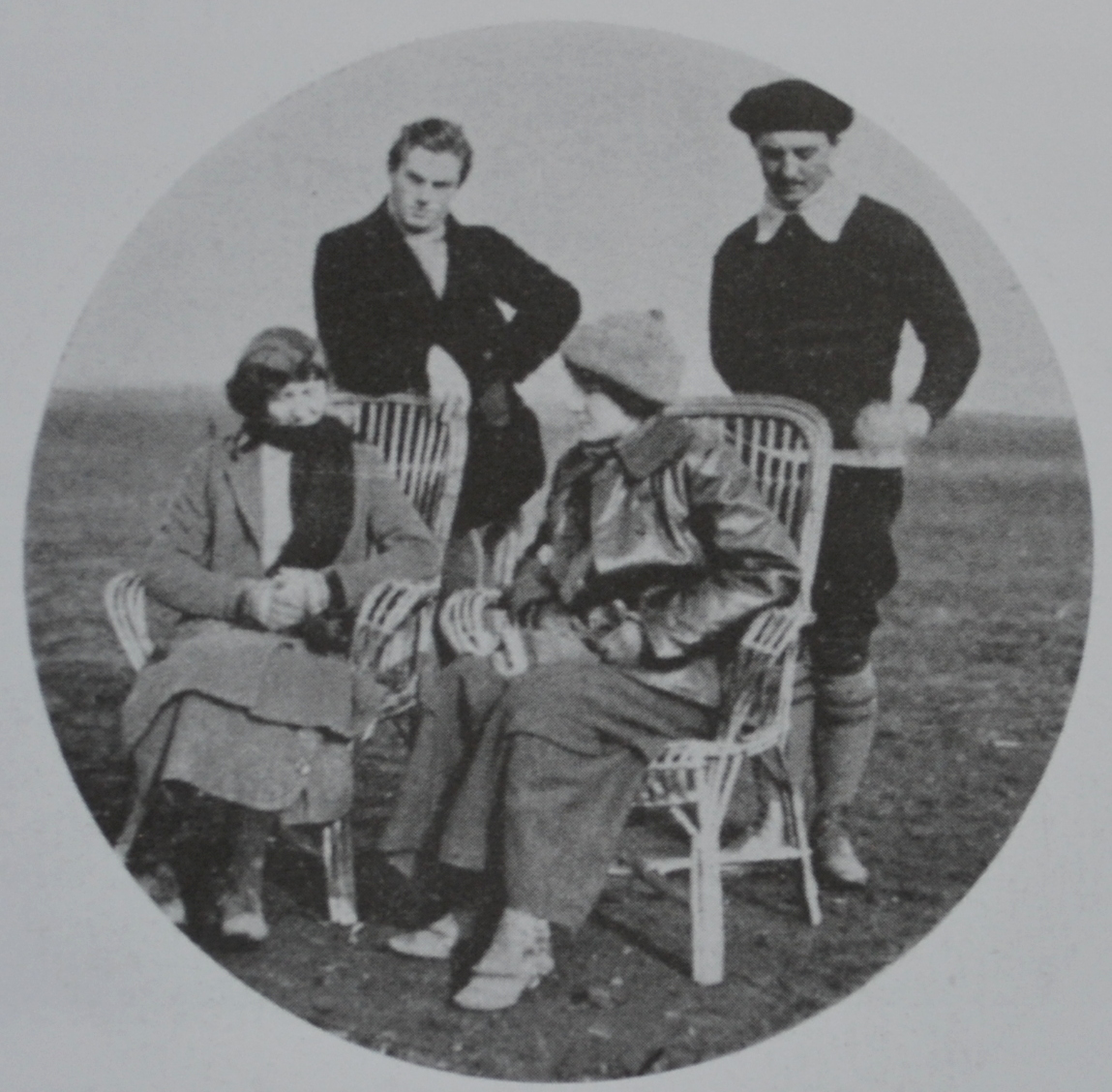
Rosina Ferrario (seated, right), with student aviator Ester Mietta and flying instructors Fabbri and Maggiora.

In 1914, Ferrario was unable to accept an invitation to fly in South America as the First World War had been declared. She applied to work for the Red Cross in Italy but was refused as she was not in the military.

== Later life ==
There is little information on Ferrario until 1921, when she was living married to Enrico Grugnola, whom she met on an outing with the Italian Alpine Club. Together, they opened a hotel with a large garden in Milan, where they lived with their two children. She regularly attended meetings of the Pionieri dell'Aeronautica (Aviation Pioneers) but no longer flew. She continued to be recognised as a pioneer until her death in 1959.
