= Lilia Ferrario =

Italian-Australian astrophysicist

Lilia Ferrario is an Italian and Australian applied mathematician and theoretical astrophysicist. She is a professor at the Australian National University (ANU) and director of the ANU Mathematical Sciences Institute.

== Research ==
Ferrario's research concerns stars with powerful rotating magnetic fields, including white dwarfs, pulsars, neutron stars, and magnetars. Her work has also helped explain the processes through which white dwarfs accrete matter from companion stars and eventually become Type Ia supernovae, and determined that much of the antimatter in the Milky Way comes from a more unusual type of supernova in which two orbiting white dwarfs collide.

== Education and career ==
Ferrario is originally from Bologna. After graduating from the University of Bologna, Ferrario completed her Ph.D. in 1989, at the Australian National University. Her dissertation, Accretion Processes in AM Herculis Systems, was jointly supervised by Dayal Wickramasinghe and Ian Tuohy.

She was a postdoctoral researcher at the University of Leicester in the UK, before returning to Australia to take up a research fellow position at the Australian National University, in the early 1990s. She headed the ANU Department of Mathematics from 2012 until 2014. In 2021, after "more than 25 years of experience as an academic at MSI", she was named the director of the Mathematical Sciences Institute.

== Personal life ==
Ferrario and her husband, English-Australian science illustrator Russell Kightley, are the parents of Australian model Stefania Ferrario. Ferrario met Kightley during her postdoctoral work at Leicester, and they moved together to Australia when Ferrario took a permanent position at ANU.
