= Villa Carminati-Ferrario, Monza =

Coordinates: 45°35′17″N 9°16′30″E

Villa Carminati-Ferrario is a building located in Monza, Italy, in piazza Citterio. It was designed in 1823 by the architect Pietro Pestagalli, in late neoclassical style.

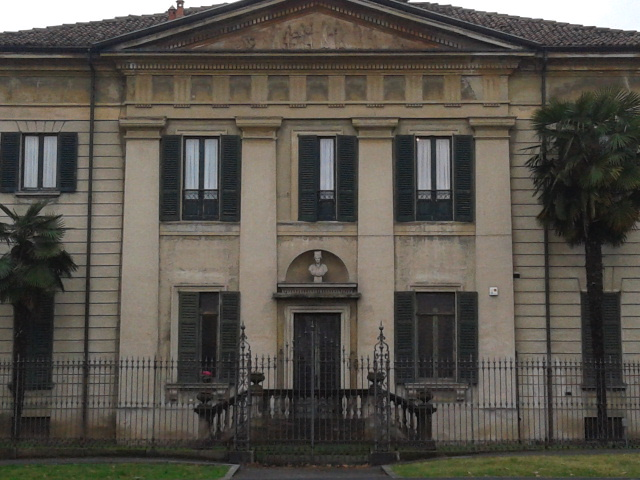
Villa Carminati-Ferrario, facade

The layout of the villa is U-shaped, centred on an internal courtyard, which reflects the architectural taste of Bourgeois families at the time. A small garden with two palm trees is located at the front of the building facing Piazza Citterio.

The facade is symmetrical and decorated with reliefs by Girolamo Rusca depicting the four seasons.

It was completed in about 1830.
