= Veneranda Fabbrica del Duomo di Milano =

Organization in charge of preserving and restoring the Duomo of Milan

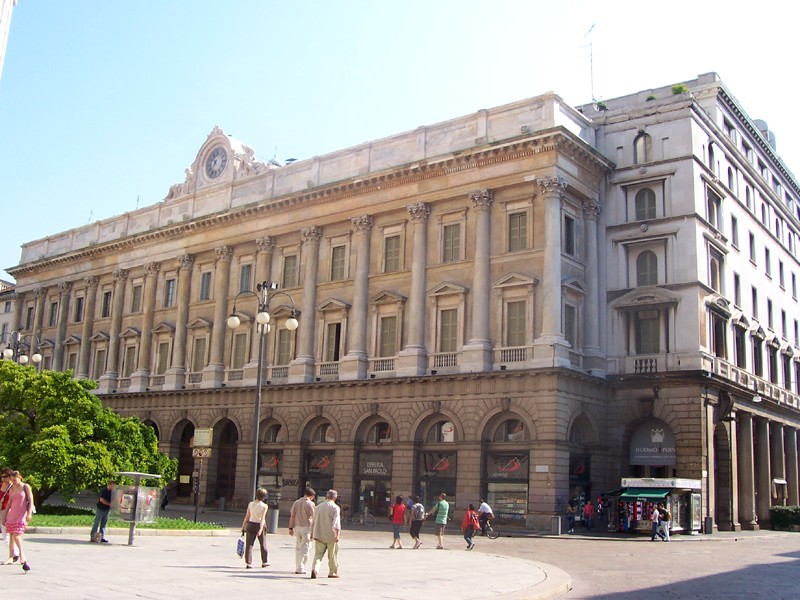
The headquarters of the Veneranda Fabbrica, in Piazza del Duomo

The Veneranda Fabbrica del Duomo di Milano ("Venerable Fabric of the Duomo of Milan") is a 600-year-old organization that was established to supervise the construction of the Cathedral of Milan (the "Duomo"). The organization is still active and involved with the maintenance, preservation, and restoration of the cathedral. Its main headquarters are located in the eponymous palace in Piazza del Duomo. Despite the Duomo being a consecrated Roman Catholic church, the Venerable Fabric is completely independent of the Holy See.

The Fabbrica was created in 1387 by the governor of Milan, Gian Galeazzo Visconti. At the time, the construction of the Duomo had already begun, and was supervised by Superstantia di Santa Maria Maggiore, a similar organization established by archbishop Antonio da Saluzzo, which was then replaced by the Fabbrica. The Fabbrica was responsible for a major change in the plans for the Duomo, including the adoption of the new Gothic style that was then becoming popular all over Europe (especially France).

The original administrative board of the Fabbrica included all of the most notable Milanese authorities of the time, including the Duke of Milan, much of the local aristocracy, and the archbishop. This was later reduced to seven members during the Austrian rule of Milan. Today, the board has six members and a president.

Over the centuries, artists and workers from the Fabbrica del Duomo have collaborated with other notable architectural projects in the city; for example, sculptors of the Fabbrica have been involved with the decoration of the facades of Palazzo Marino (Milan's city hall).
