= Accademia Nazionale Virgiliana di Scienze Lettere ed Arti =

Italian academic institute

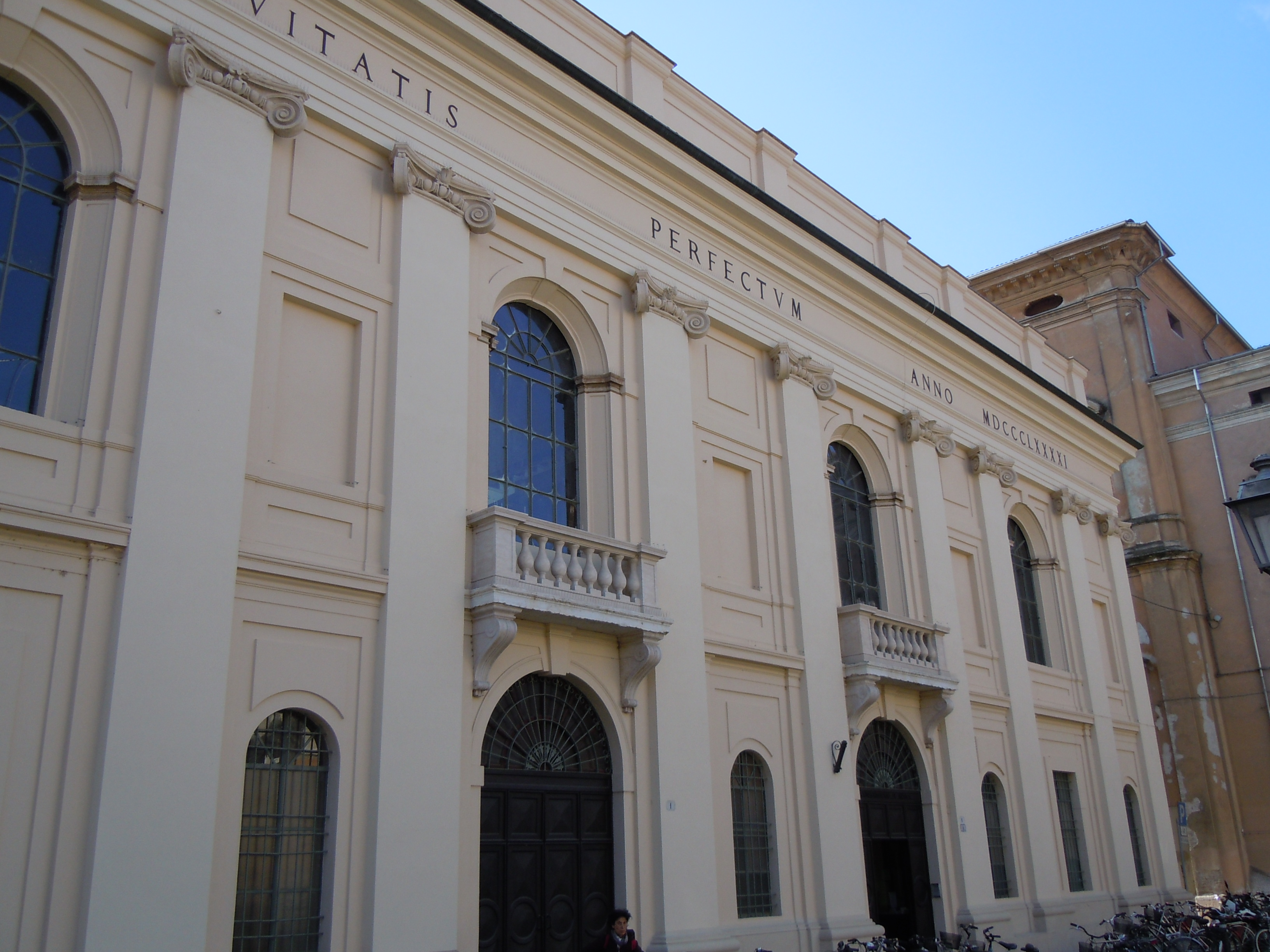
- Palace of the Accademia Nazionale Virgiliana
- Formation: 4 March 1768; 258 years ago
- Founder: Empress Maria Theresa
- Type: Learned society
- Location: Mantua, Italy
- President: Roberto Navarrini (2019– )
- Website: accademianazionalevirgiliana.org

The Accademia Nazionale Virgiliana di Scienze Lettere ed Arti (in English, National Virgilian Academy of Sciences, Letters and Arts) is an Italian scientific institution.

The main aims of the Academy are the production of original studies in every field of knowledge, the promotion of scientific research, the deepening of knowledge of Virgil and his works as well as the history of Mantua and its territory, the coordination and dissemination of culture.

The Accademia Nazionale Virgiliana has its headquarters in the Palazzo dell'Accademia Nazionale Virgiliana in Mantua, Italy.

== History ==
The Accademia Nazionale Virgiliana is part of a long tradition of literary and artistic associations that arose in Mantua during the Gonzaga era.

In the 17th century, the Accademia degli Invitti was active in Mantua and in 1648 took the name Accademia dei Timidi. Very active in the life of the city, its activities were oriented towards stage performances and dissertations in prose and verse, in Latin and Italian.

Joseph II, co-ruler with his mother, Empress Maria Theresa, informed Count Firmian, the governor of Lombardy, on 20 July 1767 of his intention to reform the Accademia dei Timidi and open it up to scientific studies. It was decided that the choice of its members should be extended to the intellectual elite of the whole of Austrian Lombardy and that the renewed academy should be divided into four classes: Philosophy, Mathematics, Experimental Physics and the Humanities.

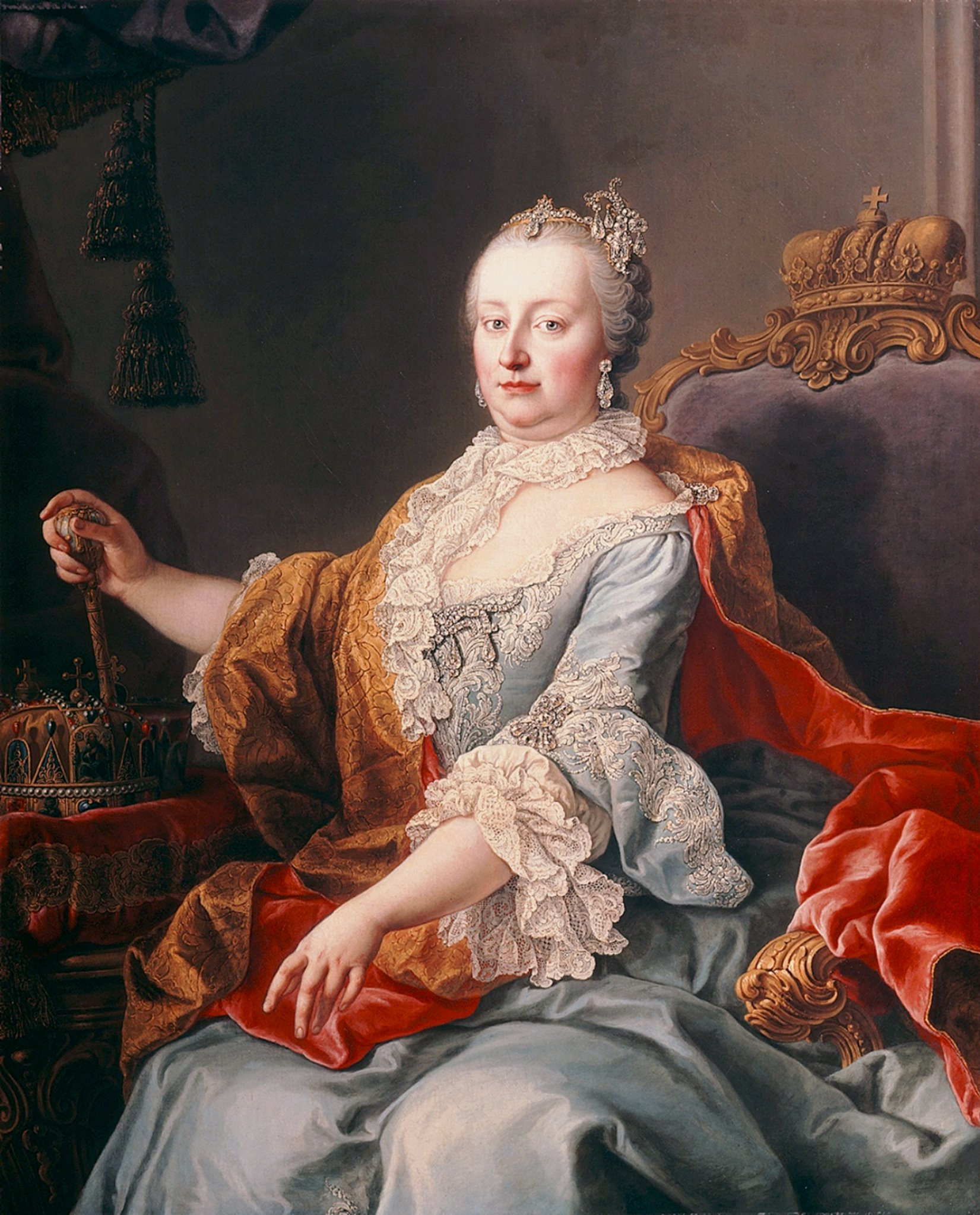
Empress Maria Theresa (1717-1780)

The formal act of establishment of the Academy by Maria Theresa, Empress of Austria is dated 4 March 1768. Under the name "Reale Accademia di Scienze e Belle Lettere" (Royal Academy of Science and Letters), the Academy became, during the Habsburg period, a true university institution, famous in Italy and abroad. It was merged in 1775 with the Academy of painting and sculpture.

The Academy's activities included studies and research in every field of knowledge of the time. It stimulated studies on the most important problems of the time, in particular on hydraulics and public waters, on hygienic conditions and on medical-surgical topics.

Following Napoleon Bonaparte's Italian Campaign and the consequent new territorial layout of the city of Mantua, a new plan for the Academy was decided, and it changed its name, assuming the title Accademia Virgiliana on 31 May 1797.

After the Congress of Vienna, important names of renowned scholars, both national and international, were associated with the Academy, including Lazzaro Spallanzani, Cesare Beccaria, Alessandro Volta and Vincenzo Monti. Emperor Franz Joseph revitalised the Accademia Virgiliana and, by imperial decree of 22 January 1865, added it the name "Regia".

The activity of the Academy was not changed by the plebiscite of 1866, which sanctioned the annexation of the province of Mantua to the Kingdom of Italy. With Royal Decree No. 2376 of 16 October 1934, the Royal Virgilian Academy of Mantua was given a new statute. The proclamation of the Italian Republic did not interfere with the work of the Academy, which took on its present name in 1981, following Presidential Decree no. 371 of 2 May 1981.

== Headquarters ==
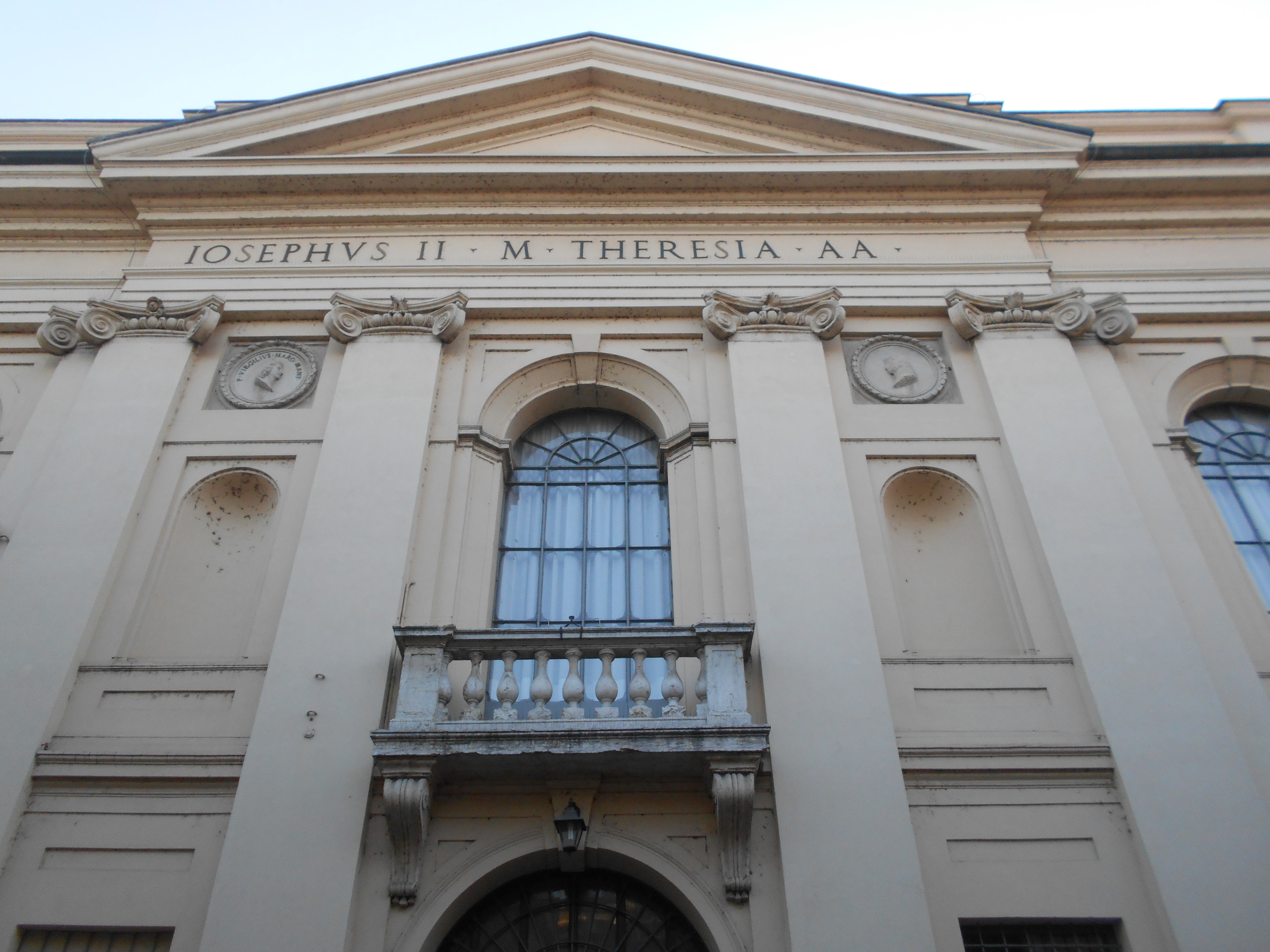
Mantua, palace of the Accademia Nazionale Virgiliana

The seat of the Accademia Nazionale Virgiliana is the palace of the Accademia Nazionale Virgiliana, built on the plot previously occupied by a Gonzaga residence and the premises of the Accademia dei Timidi.

In the palace, designed by Giuseppe Piermarini and Paolo Pozzo in the neoclassical style, is the Teatro Scientifico (Scientific Theater) by Antonio Galli da Bibbiena, with a bell-shaped plan and four tiers of superimposed boxes, intended for the Academy's solemn events and inaugurated in 1769. Wolfgang Amadeus Mozart played here on 16 January 1770, when he was thirteen-year-old.

== Organisation and activities ==
The Accademia Nazionale Virgiliana is governed by its statute, approved by decree no. 1151 of the President of the Italian Republic on 19 December 1983 and integrated by the decree of the Minister for Cultural and Environmental Heritage of 24 April 1996.

The academic body is composed of ordinary academicians, no more than 90; honorary academicians, no more than 10; pro tempore honorary academicians, no more than 10; corresponding members, no more than 60; supernumerary academicians.

Ordinary academicians and corresponding members belong to one of the three classes of the Academy: the Class of Letters and Arts, the Class of Moral Sciences and the Class of Mathematical, Physical and Natural Sciences; for each class there are 30 ordinary academicians and 20 corresponding members.

Since 1863 the Academy has been publishing the volumes of the "Atti e Memorie" (Acts and Memoirs) and carries out an intense editorial activity.

The Accademia Nazionale Virgiliana institutes, every two years, the International Virgil Prize, aimed at promoting studies on the figure and work of the great Latin poet, divided into two sections: the "Vergilius Prize" and the "Mantua Prize" (the latter is reserved for scholars who are under 40 years of age at the date of the announcement).

== Library, music archive, historical archive, prints collection ==
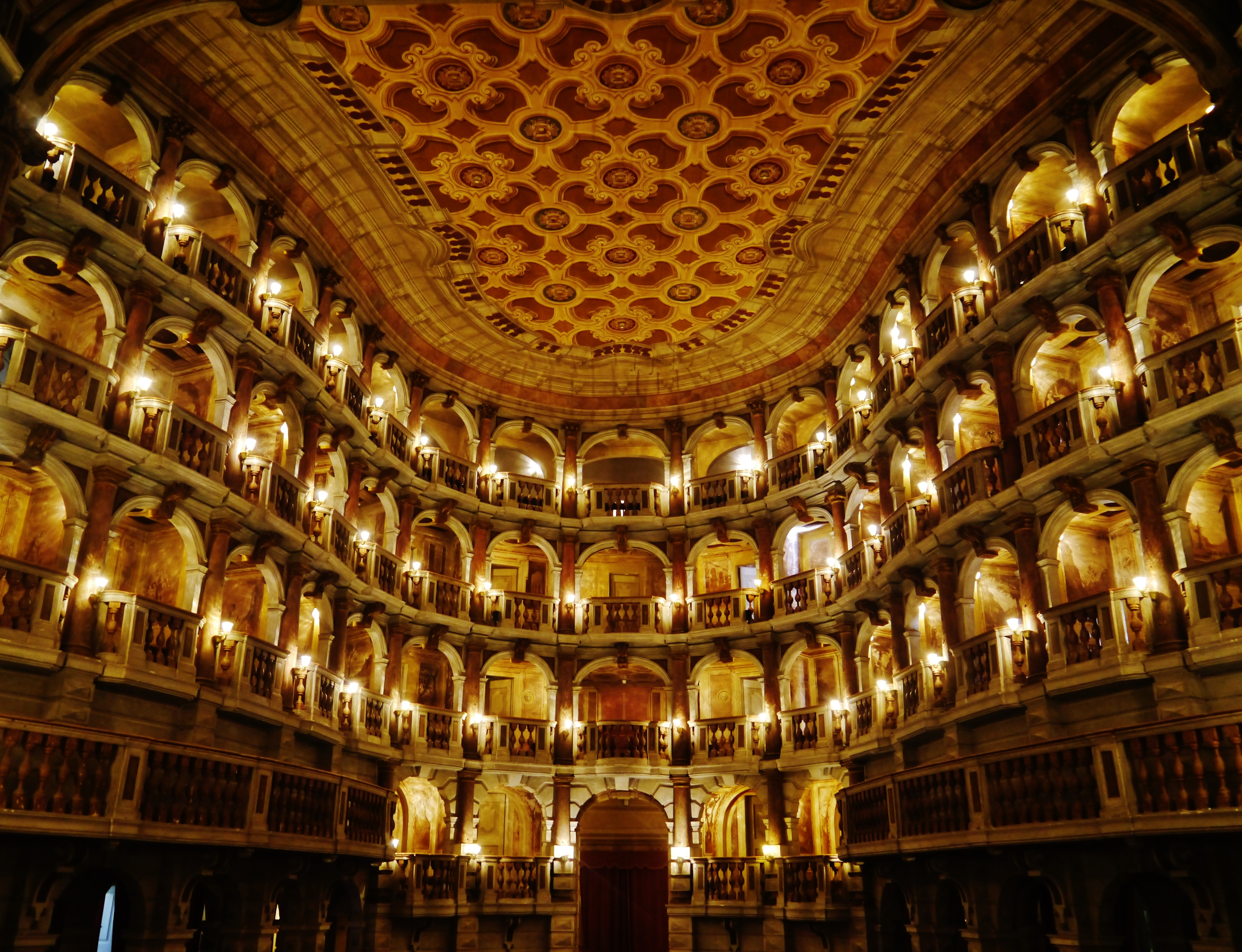
Mantua, Teatro Scientifico

The Academy's library currently holds a large collection of over 40,000 books.

The music archive has 426 manuscript scores from the 18th century. The collection includes mainly scores of musicians active in the 18th century, such as Johann Christian Bach, Baldassarre Galuppi and Francesco Salieri. Many scores feature works by Pietro Metastasio.

The historical archive of the Accademia Nazionale Virgiliana in Mantua dates back to the time of its foundation. The documentary material preserved reflects on the one hand the progressive sedimentation of the documentation produced by the administrative and accounting activities of the Institute, and on the other hand the peculiar scientific and literary production, fruit of the cultural exercise of the academicians.

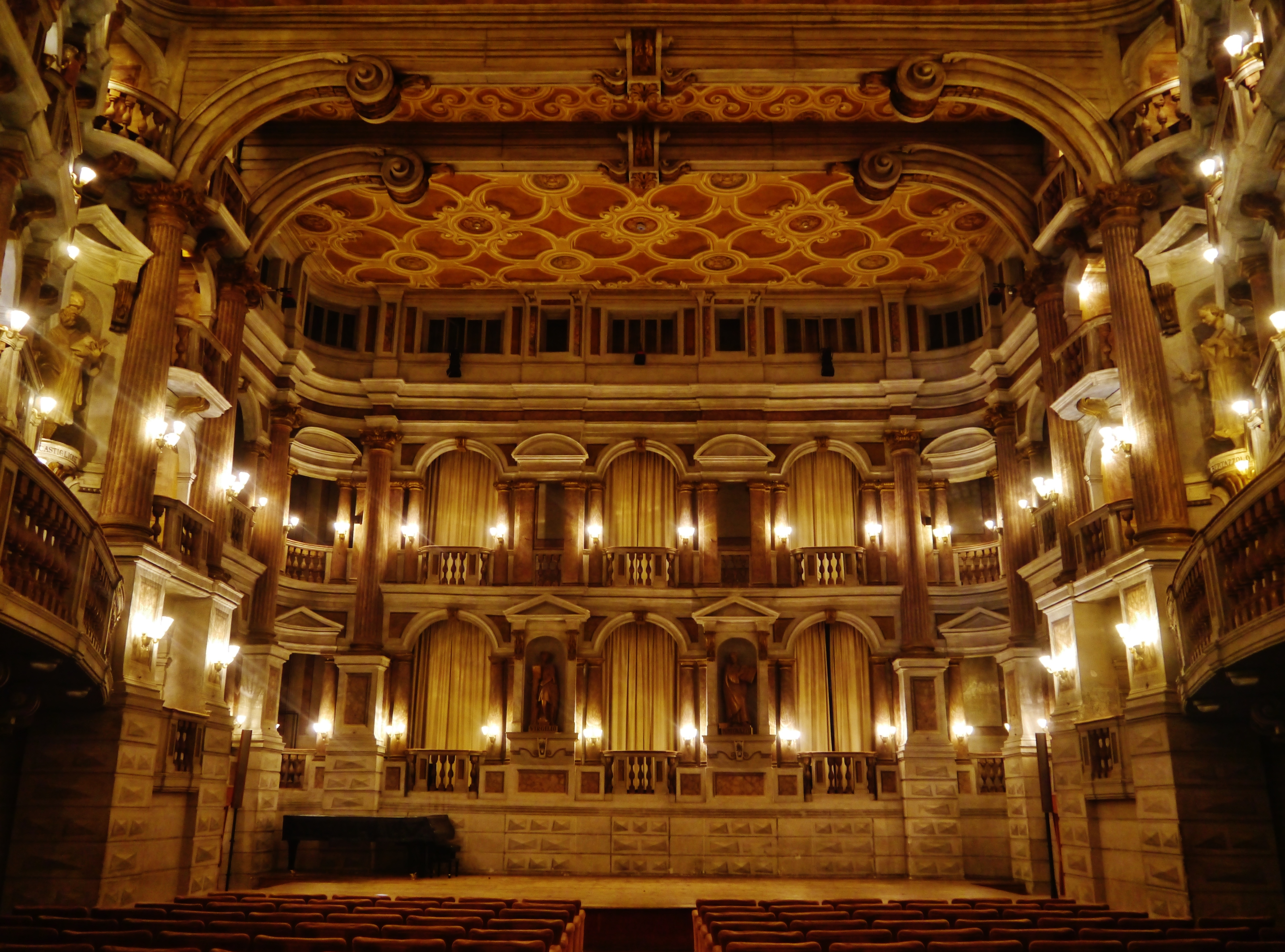
Mantua, Teatro Scientifico (view of the stage)

A section of the historical archive containing the handwritten dissertations (about 550 are preserved, divided into 20 envelopes, from envelopes 42 to 61) of those who took part, between 1768 and 1796, in the competitions announced by the Academy for the four classes of Philosophy, Mathematics, Physics and Fine Arts; also the monthly dissertations read by the academicians during the periodic meetings and divided into various subject groups: Education, Philosophy, Natural History, Hydraulics, Arts and Crafts, Fine Literature, History, Fine Arts and Music, Archaeology, Medicine and Veterinary Medicine, Hygiene and Surgery, Agronomy, Legislation, Criticism, Mathematics.

Hundreds of prints are digitised in the prints collection section, each with a specific data sheet.

== Presidents ==
- Carlo Ottavio di Colloredo (1768-1786)
- Giambattista Gherardo d'Arco (1786-1791)
- Girolamo Murari dalla Corte (1792-1798)
- Angelo Petrozzani (1798-1801)
- Girolamo Murari dalla Corte (1801-1832)
- Federico Cocastelli di Montiglio (1834-1847)
- Antonio Guidi di Bagno (1847-1865)
- Adelelmo Cocastelli di Montiglio (1865-1867)
- Giovanni Arrivabene (1867-1881)
- Giambattista Intra (1881-1907)
- Antonio Carlo dall'Acqua (1907-1928)
- Pietro Torelli (1929-1948)
- Eugenio Masè Dari (1948-1961)
- Vittore Colorni (1961-1972)
- Eros Benedini (1972-1991)
- Claudio Gallico (1991-2006)
- Giorgio Bernardi Perini (2006-2009)
- Giorgio Zamboni (2009-2011)
- Piero Gualtierotti (2011-2019)
- Roberto Navarrini (2019-...)

The title of Prefect was used from 1767 to 1797 and from 1799 to 1934; the title of President from 1797 to 1799 and from 1934 to the present.

== Some prominent academicians ==
- Cesare Beccaria
- Saverio Bettinelli
- Gino Fano
- Lorenzo Mascheroni
- Sextius Alexandre François de Miollis
- Antonio Paolucci
- Giuseppe Parini
- Carlo Rosmini
- Antonio Scarpa
- Lazzaro Spallanzani
- Pietro Verri
- Alessandro Volta
