= Villa Tittoni Traversi, Desio =

Rural palace in Desio, northern Italy

Villa Tittoni Traversi
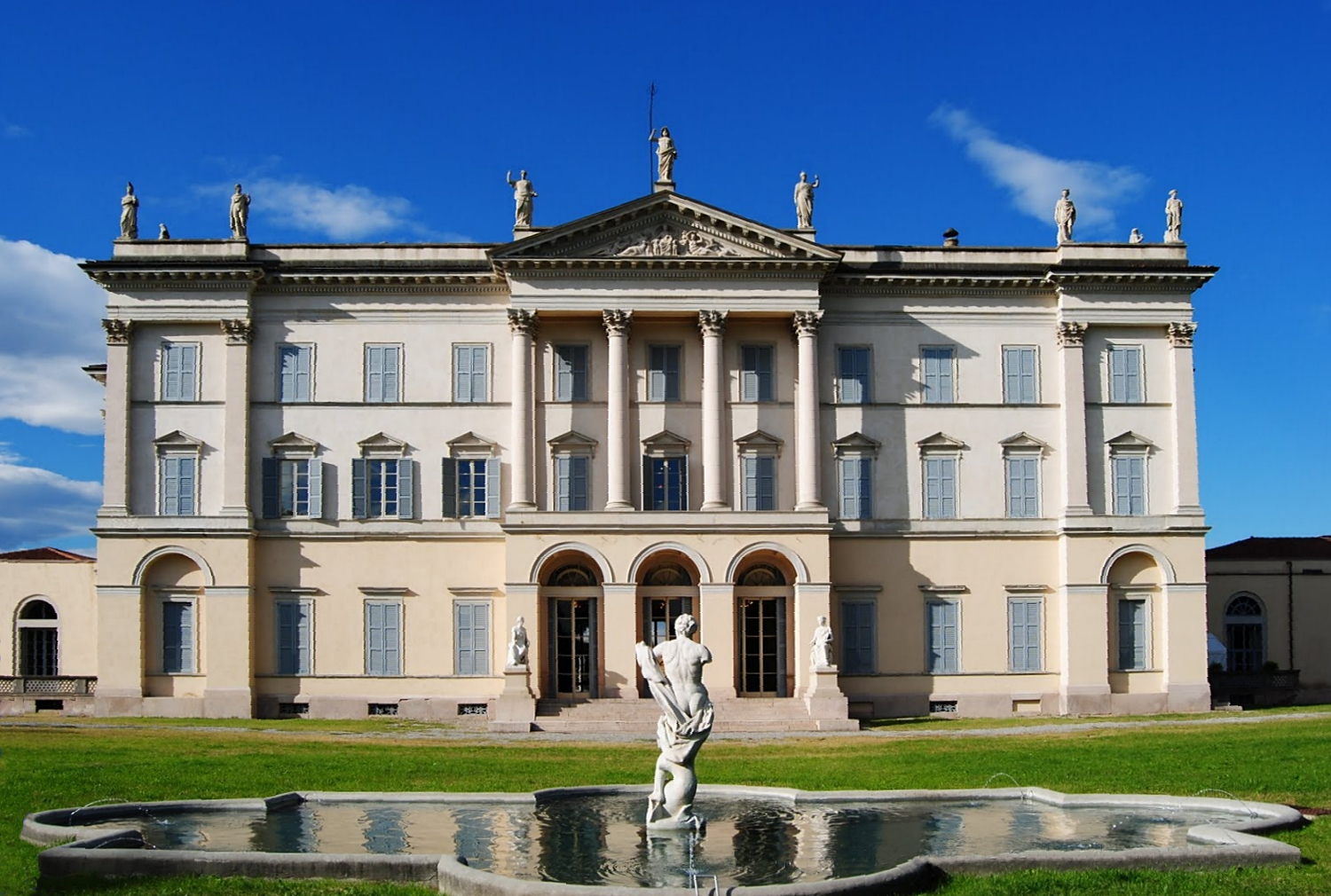
- Garden façade
- Click on the map for a fullscreen view

General information
- Location: Desio, Italy
- Coordinates: 45.6173°N 9.2151°E

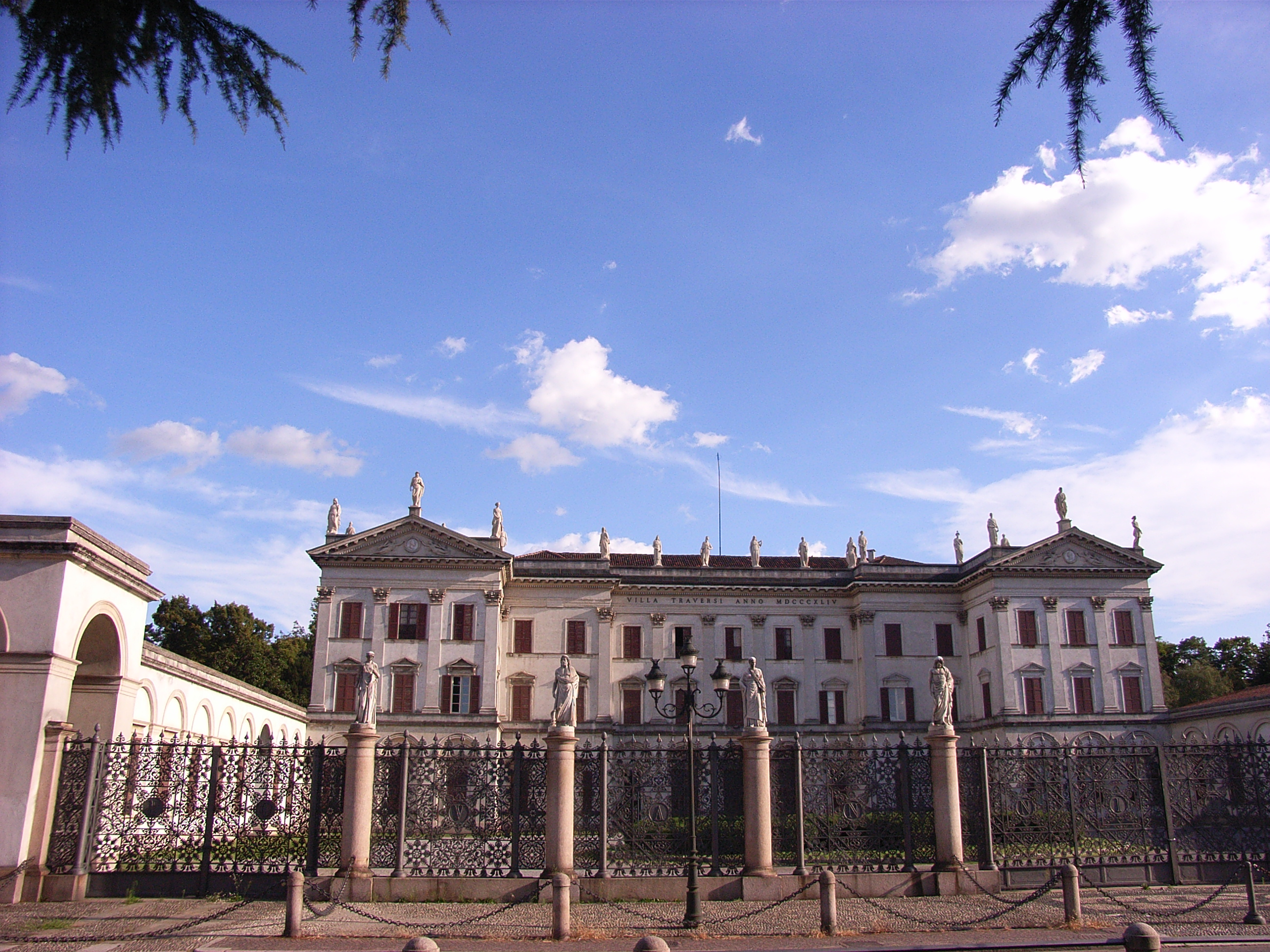
Street façade of Villa Tittoni Traversi.

The Villa Traversi Tittoni, or Villa Cusani Traversi Tittoni is a rural palace in Desio, northern Italy.

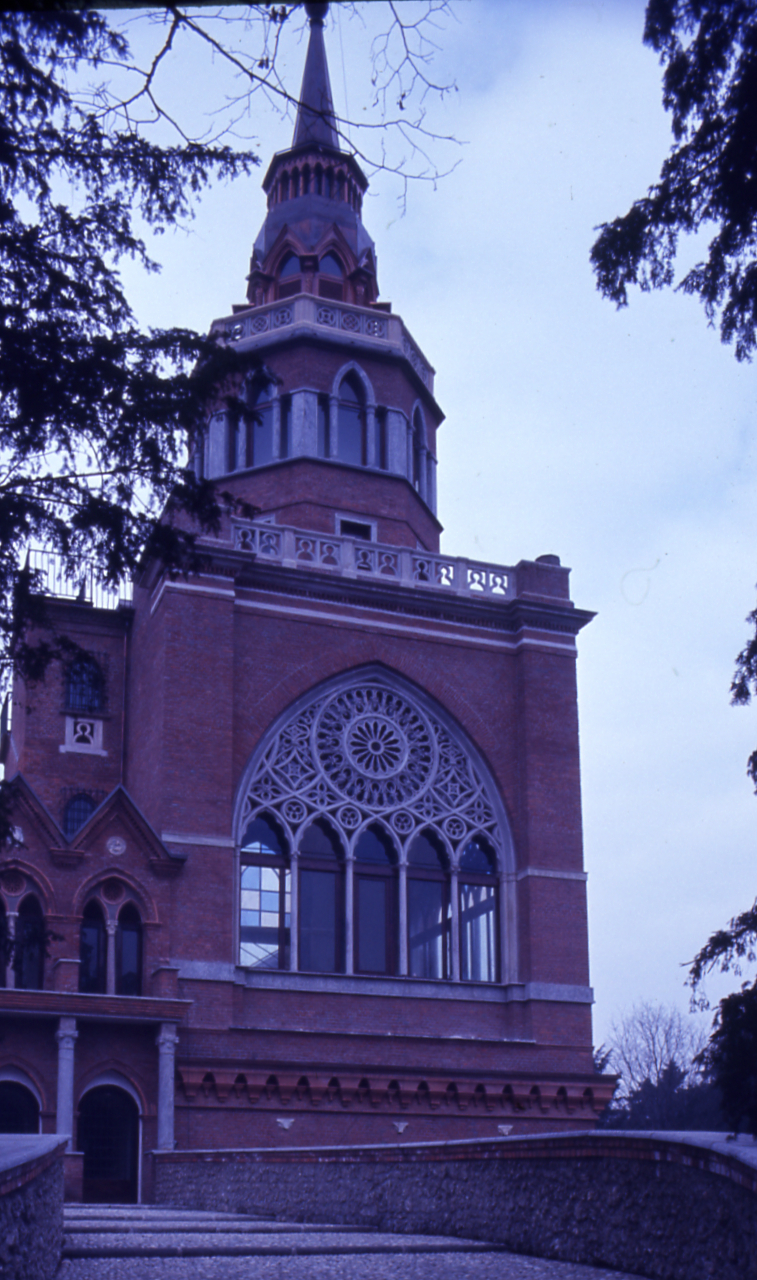
The tower by Pelagio Palagi, 1976.

An original palace at the site was built by the aristocratic Cusani family. The structure was rebuilt and redesigned first in 1776 by Giuseppe Piermarini in a Neoclassical style. In 1817, the villa was sold to the lawyer Giovanni Traversi; beginning in 1840, the interiors were refurbished and the façade was added by Pelagio Palagi. The palace has extensive gardens, designed in a free nineteenth-century "English style". In 1900, the Villa became the property of Tommaso Tittoni, a statesman and diplomat. After World War II, the house functioned as a seminary, until, in 1975, it was acquired by the comune of Desio.

The villa now hosts a library and museum, named after Giuseppe Scalvini.

== Sources ==
- LombardiaBeniCulturali: La Villa Traversi Tittoni a Desio
