= Giovanni Arrivabene =

Italian-Belgian noble, economist and politician

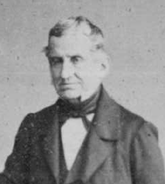
Giovanni Arrivabene

Giovanni Arrivabene (24 June 1787 – 11 January 1881) was an Italian-Belgian politician, and a notable figure in both Italian and Belgian intellectual and political circles.

== Life ==
Arrivabene was born in 1787 in Mantua, which in 1815 became part of the Austrian-ruled Kingdom of Lombardy–Venetia. He was a staunch opponent of Austrian rule in Italy and was suspected of being a member of the revolutionary Carbonari, a secret society advocating for Italian independence. In 1821, he was arrested but eventually released due to a lack of evidence. Following his release, he chose voluntary exile, first moving to France, then to England, and eventually settling in Belgium. During his time in England, Arrivabene formed friendships with prominent economists such as James Mill, Thomas Tooke and John Ramsay McCulloch.

In Belgium, Arrivabene became close to influential figures like Sylvain Van de Weyer, Félix de Mérode, Adolphe Quetelet, and Édouard Ducpétiaux. In 1829, he purchased a house in Brussels, and in 1834, he was one of the founding members of the Free University of Brussels. He was naturalised as a Belgian citizen in 1841, and four years later, in 1845, he was appointed to a royal commission focused on improving the condition of workers in Belgium. From 1850 to 1854, Arrivabene served as a provincial councillor for the Province of Brabant.

Arrivabene was a prolific writer on political economy and became the founding member and first president of the Belgian Society for Political Economy, established in 1855. Despite his extensive writings, he was not particularly original, often summarizing existing economic theories. Nevertheless, he was an important figure in the promotion of political economy in Belgium.

In 1860, following Austria’s defeat at the Battle of Solferino during the Second Italian War of Independence, Arrivabene was appointed to the Senate of the Kingdom of Sardinia, further solidifying his influence in Italian political life. He divided his remaining years between Belgium and Italy, maintaining strong connections in both countries. He was also a recipient of the Order of Saints Maurice and Lazarus.

From 1867 to 1881, he served as the Prefect of the Royal Virgilian Academy, an institution dedicated to the legacy of the Roman poet Virgil, who was born near Mantua. Arrivabene died in his hometown Mantua in 1881.
