= Palazzo Cusani (Milan) =

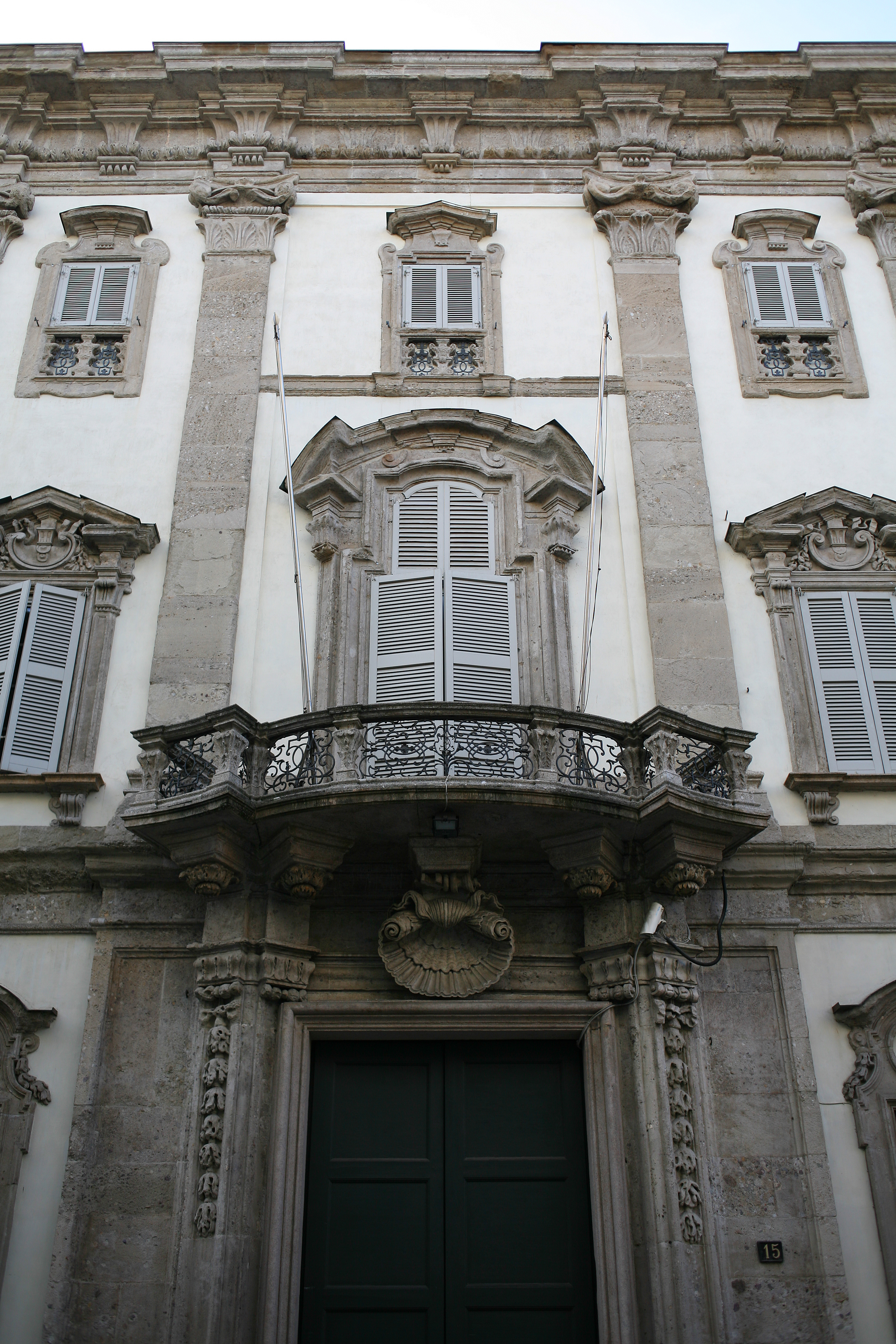
- Interactive map of the Palazzo Cusani area

General information
- Status: In use
- Type: Palace
- Architectural style: Baroque
- Location: Milan, Italy, 13–15, Via Brera
- Coordinates: 45.471003°N 9.187303°E
- Current tenants: Army Military Command Lombardy (owner Ministry of Defence)
- Construction started: 17th century
- Renovated: 1712–1719 (east façade) 1775–1779 (int. façade)

Design and construction
- Architects: Richini School (Note: It is probably impossible to trace the actual author of the Palazzo Cusani project, however there are many details that trace this creation back to the "Scuola del Richini", not least the large internal staircase of honour.); Giovanni Ruggeri (facade int); Giuseppe Piermarini (facade int.)

Palazzo Cusani is a 17th-century palace in Milan, Italy. It was remodelled the first time between 1712 and 1719 and the second time between 1775 and 1779. Historically belonging to the sestiere of Porta Nuova, it is located at via Brera 13–15.

== History and description ==
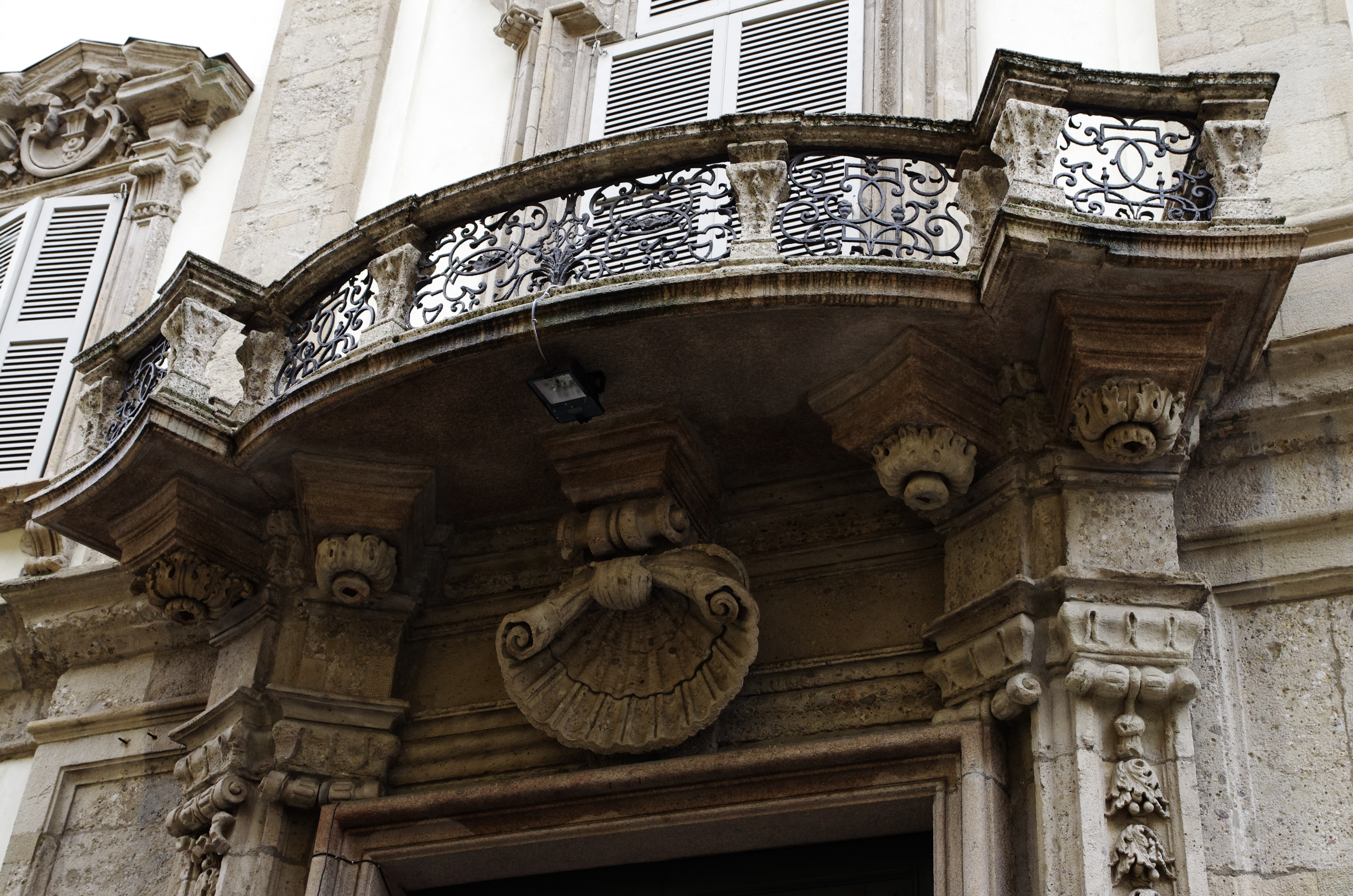
Detail of the balcony above the main entrance

The Cusani family had acquired during the 17th century a property near Church of Sant'Eusebio, which has now disappeared: there Agostino Cusani (1592–1640), feudal lord and later marquis of Chignolo Po would have a palace erected during the first decades of the 17th century. Subsequently, the palace was remodelled a first time (1694–1719) at the behest of Gerolamo Cusani, who commissioned Giovanni Ruggeri for the new exterior façade; a second remodelling (1775–1779) was instead entrusted to Piermarini by Ferdinando Cusani (1737–1815) and concerned the interior façade, which was built in Neoclassical forms. The palace was sold in 1808 by his son Luigi (1769–1836), ruined by gambling debts, to the state property of the Kingdom of Italy, which established the Ministry of War there. Along with this property, the adjacent ones were also sold. (Note: Already registered according to the Teresian numbering 1568, 1561, 1643, 1642.)

In spite of the many alterations carried out both during the Austrian period and in the first decades of the 20th century (culminating with the construction of a new wing overlooking the via del Carmine in 1935) and the successive bombings to which the building was subjected, the interiors still preserve intact on the piano nobile most of the 18th-century decorations originally present, which can be found in the deed of sale of the palazzo (1808). (Note: The deed of sale of the palace drawn up by Luigi Cusani listed rooms with frescoed vaults, white and gold stuccoes and marble fireplaces.) Instead, the original furnishings and a large part of the garden, notoriously a place for parties and balls particularly dear to Ferdinando Cusani, were almost completely lost.

Headquarters of the III Army Corps until 2004, it is currently the NATO representation headquarters in Milan. Since 2012, it has also been the headquarters of the Comando Militare Esercito Lombardia.

From an architectural point of view, one must note the peculiarity of the so to speak exuberant forms of the exterior façade, an anomaly when compared to Milanese buildings of the time, which betrays the Roman influence of Giovanni Ruggeri. In fact, it is no coincidence that the façade is reminiscent of the Late Roman Baroque, in which windows with mixtilinear frames and bulging balconies stand out. The façade also features two twin portals, said to be wanted by two brothers of the family for their mutual desire not to meet.

A peculiarity of the palace is that three cannonballs fired by Radetzky's artillery during the Five Days of Milan are embedded in its rear façade.

In May 2021, it hosted the contemporary art exhibition Tramestio, curated and organised by young curators Michael Camisa (1996) and Sophia Radici (1993), who presented three contemporary artists under 30 on the Milanese scene.
