= Teatro Bibiena =

Theatre in Mantua, Italy

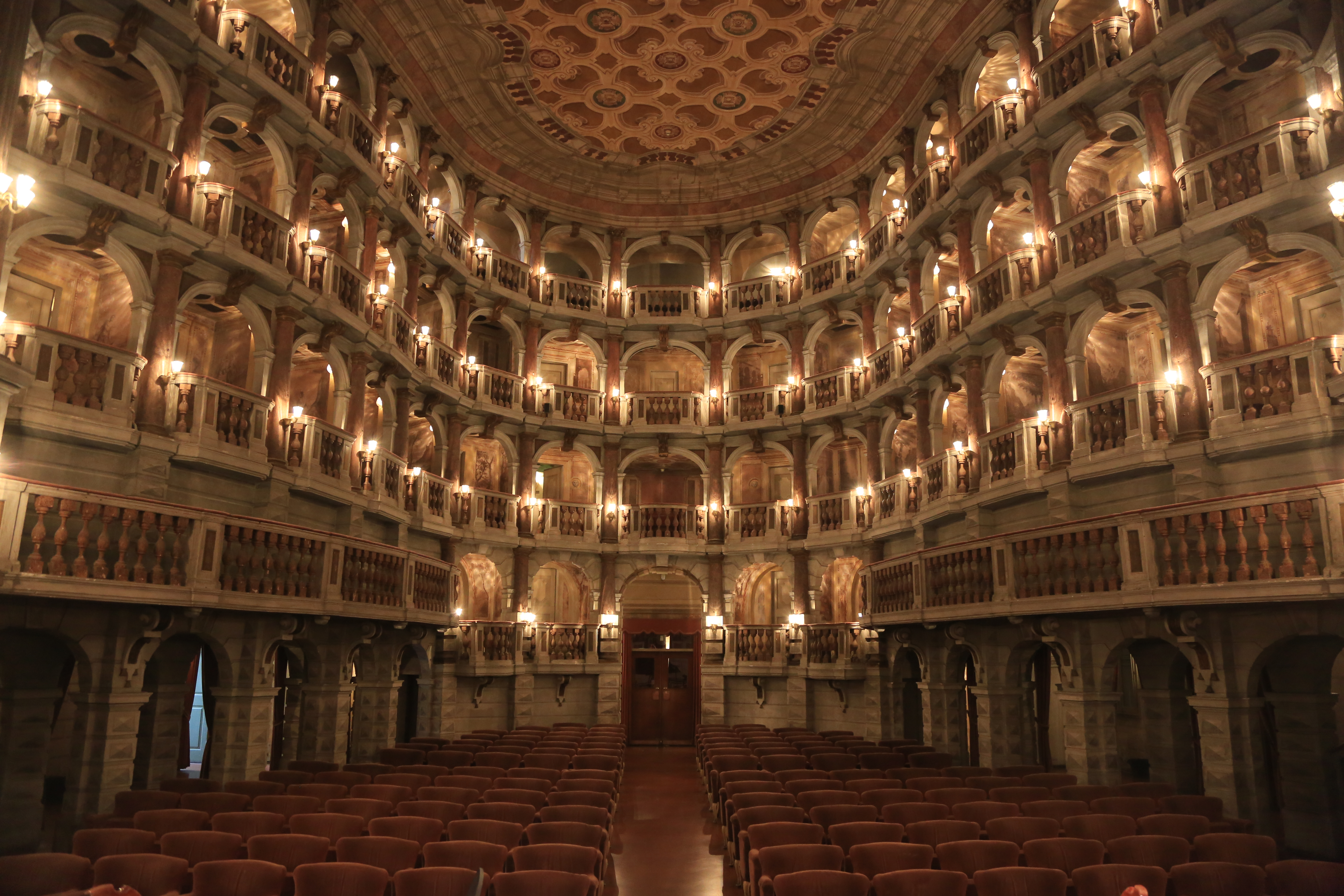
- Interactive map of Teatro Bibiena
- Address: Via Accademia, 47; Mantua; Italy
- Coordinates: 45.157838°N 10.798115°E
- Capacity: 363 seats
- Type: Theatre

Construction
- Built: 1767–69
- Opened: 1769
- Years active: 1769–present
- Architect: Antonio Galli da Bibbiena

The Teatro Bibiena (also known as, among others, the Teatro Scientifico, Teatro Accademico or Teatrino della Accademia Filarmonica) is a theatre in Mantua, Italy. Designed by Antonio Galli da Bibbiena, it was built in 1767–69 and decorated in 1773–75 with a Piermarini façade by Paolo Pozzo (1741–1803).

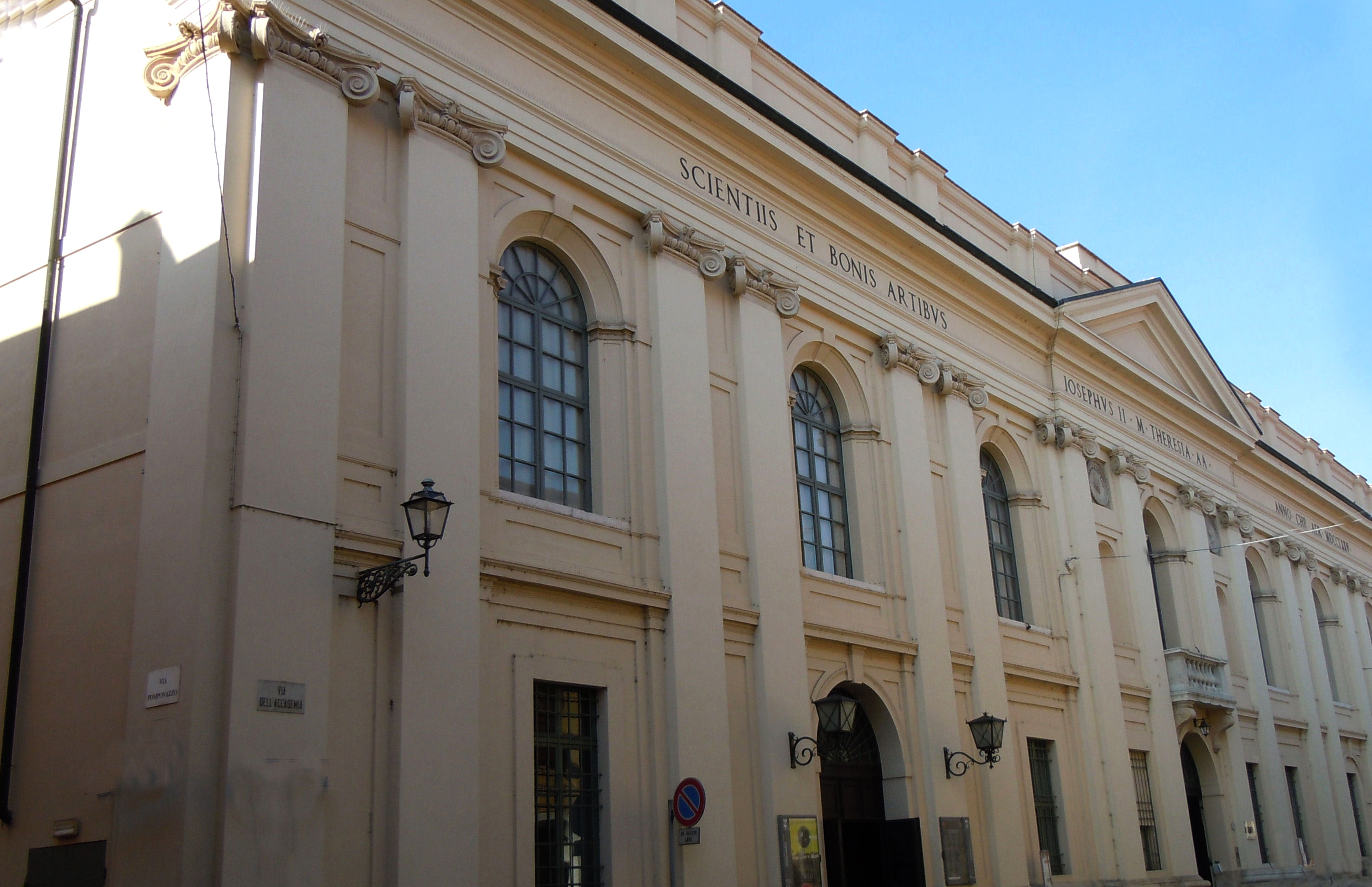
Façade of the theatre

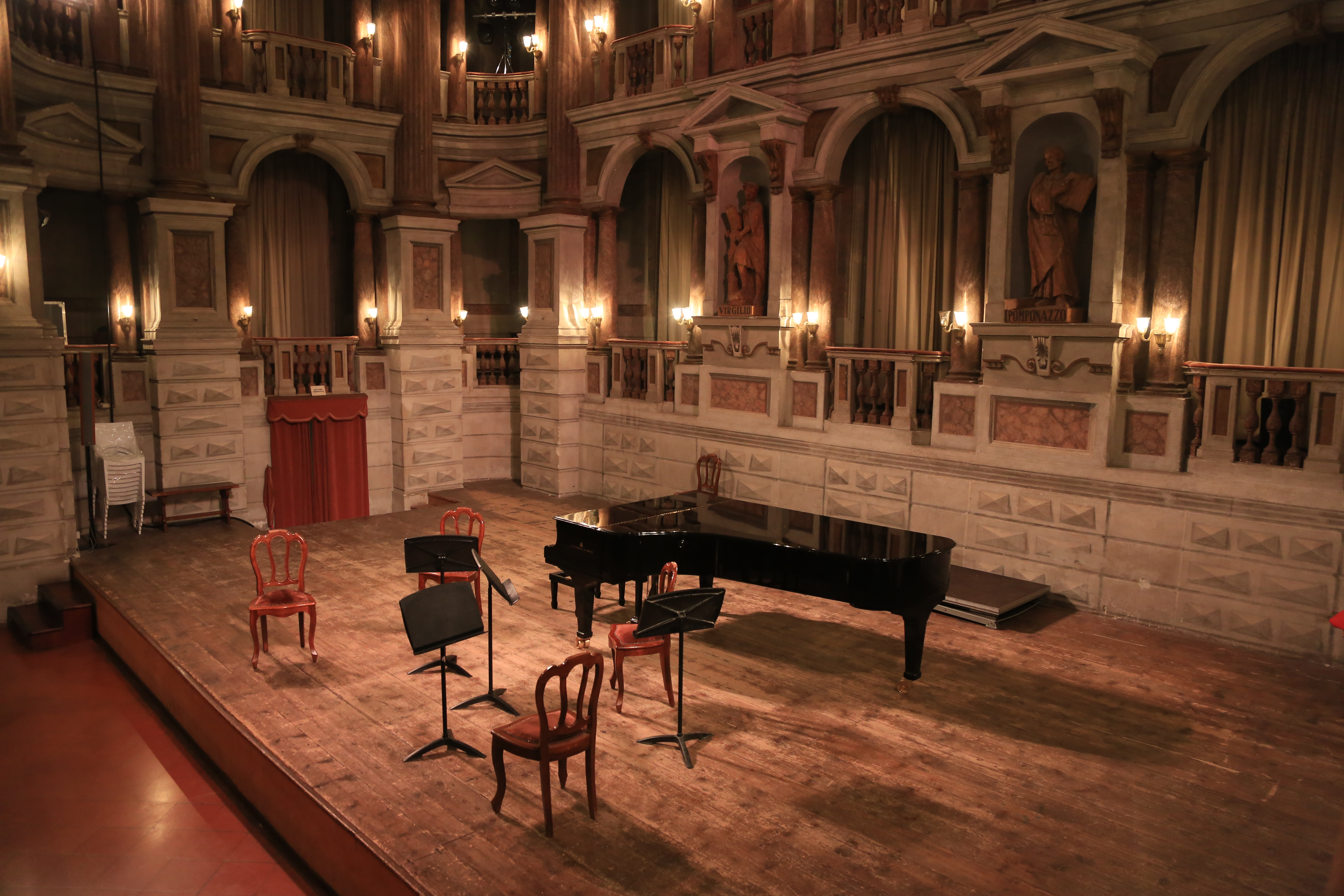
View of the stage

Constructed for the Royal Virgilian Academy of Science and Arts, the theatre was designed in late Baroque or early Rococo style by Antonio Galli Bibiena and erected between 1767 and 1769. With a bell-shaped floorplan and four rows of boxes, it followed the new style of theatres then in vogue. It was intended to host both theatre productions and concerts, and scientific discourses and conventions. Bibiena also provided the monochrome frescoes in the interior. The theatre is now considered to be his most important work.

It was opened officially on 3 December 1769. A few weeks later, on 16 January 1770, thirteen-year-old Wolfgang Amadeus Mozart played a concert here, with resounding success. His father, Leopold Mozart, wrote about the theatre: "In all my life, I have never seen anything more beautiful of its kind".

In 1773, Giuseppe Piermarini, who constructed the neighbouring palazzo for the Virgilian Academy of Science and Arts, designed and built the façade of the theatre.

Still used for its original purposes, it now can also be visited by tourists as one of Mantua's museums. The theatre is relatively small, with a scene 12,3 metres wide and 5,6 metres deep, and a maximum audience of 363 persons.
