= Giuseppe Piermarini =

Italian architect

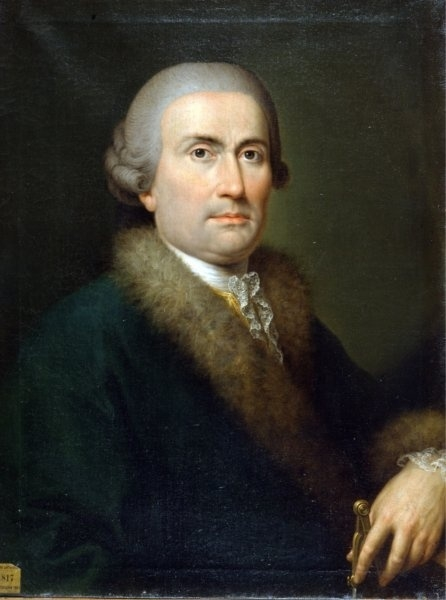
- Giuseppe Piermarini, portrait by Martin Knoller
- Born: 18 July 1734; Foligno, Papal States
- Died: 18 February 1808 (aged 73); Foligno, Papal States
- Occupation: Architect
- Movement: Neoclassicism
- Buildings: Teatro alla Scala; Royal Villa of Monza; Villa Tittoni Traversi, Desio; Palazzo Belgioioso; Palazzo Greppi; Palazzo Sannazzari

Giuseppe Piermarini (Italian pronunciation: [dʒuˈzɛppe ˌpjɛrmaˈriːni]; 18 July 1734 – 18 February 1808) was an Italian architect who trained with Luigi Vanvitelli in Naples and designed the Teatro alla Scala in Milan (1776–78), which remains the work by which he is chiefly remembered. Indeed, il Piermarini (with the masculine definite article preceding the architect's name) serves as an occasional journalistic synonym for the celebrated opera house. Piermarini was appointed professor in the Academy of Fine Arts of Brera, better known as Brera Academy, Milan, when it was formally founded in 1776.

== Biography ==
=== Early work, to 1771 ===
Piermarini was born at Foligno, then part of the Papal States. The early interest he showed in construction and drawing and the encouraging opinions of the mathematician Ruggero Boscovich convinced Piermarini’s parents to send him to Rome. There he devoted himself to mathematics and also studied architecture, attending the studios of Paolo Posi, Carlo Murena (1713–64) and, later, of Luigi Vanvitelli; he was also associated with the Accademia di San Luca. In this environment he became convinced of the need for accurate knowledge not only of Classical architecture but also of that of the 16th and 17th centuries. Piermarini drew many Roman buildings, attempting to identify the characteristic features of each type, which he would use later in his own work. Many drawings from this period of study and apprenticeship, including workbooks, survive. Piermarini’s subsequent work is marked by great attention to detail and accompanied by a vast amount of graphic material. In this he was encouraged by Vanvitelli, for whom he worked as a draughtsman after 1765 in Naples, where the latter was directing construction of the Bourbon builders’ yards. He may also have participated in the execution of Vanvitelli’s plans in Caserta. Piermarini’s drawings document Vanvitelli’s works at the Caserma del Ponte della Maddalena, his plans for the church of the Santissima Annunziata and the fictive architecture created for the wedding of Ferdinand IV with Maria Carolina of Austria at the Palazzo Teora in 1768. In Naples Piermarini continued to show an interest in antiquity, and with Carlo Vanvitelli (1739–1821) he produced reliefs in the amphitheatre at Capua and in 1766 for the Arch of Trajan in Benevento. These designs were printed on eight large blocks by Carlo Nolli (d. 1770) in 1770. By this date, however, Piermarini had left Luigi Vanvitelli’s workshop.

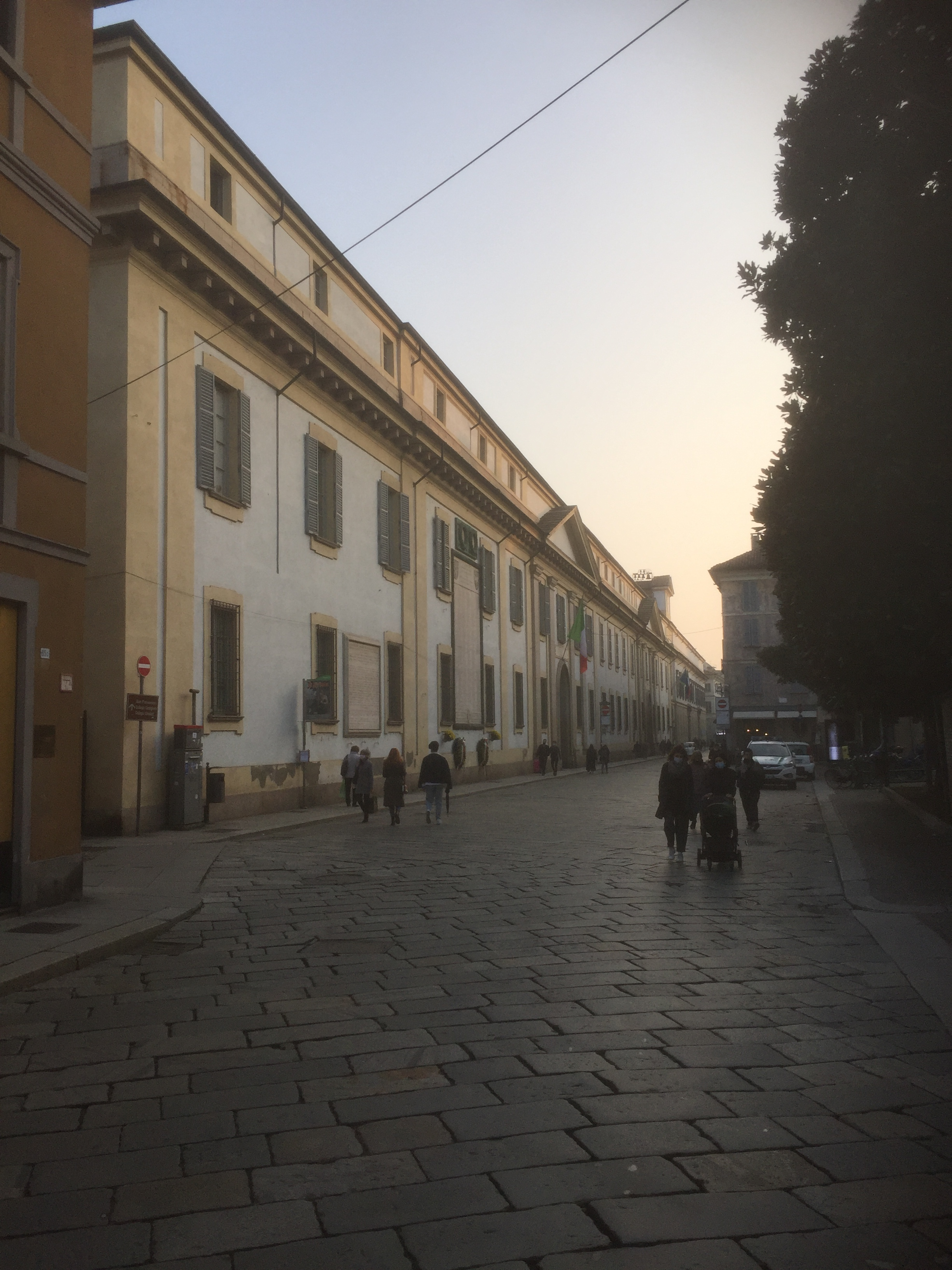
Façade of the Old Campus of the University of Pavia

Having moved to Milan in 1769 as Vanvitelli’s collaborator, he remained in Lombardy when Vanvitelli abandoned work on the Palazzo Ducale. On becoming architect to the archducal court in Milan in December 1769 Piermarini quickly established himself as the leading architect in Lombardy in the late 18th century. He imposed on the cities of the region his values of functionality and architectural decorum, based on subtle rhythms and regular proportions and derived from clear and precise designs with no concession to plastic decorative rhythms. His carefully conceived and functional scheme for the Accademia Teresiana (1770–71) in Mantua was preferred to that of Antonio Galli-Bibiena. Pairs of Ionic pilasters on the façade frame large openings that admit light particularly to the upper floor, which has an oval room for teaching life drawing. The central part of the main façade is emphasized by a slight projection marked by a pediment that is continued into the attic storey. At the same time Piermarini began his conversion (1771–9) of the University of Pavia into a more functional scholastic complex and designed a new façade. For the university he remodeled th Old Campus and built the greenhouses of the Botanical Garden. Piermarini’s greatest success, however, came with his designs for the displays staged to celebrate the entry into Milan in 1771 of the Archduke Ferdinand of Austria, Duke of Breisgau, and his wife, Maria Beatrice d’Este. These were much appreciated by the enlightened cultural élite of Milan: he transformed the Corso di Porta Orientale into a green amphitheatre, placing in one of the bends an elevated miniature temple, the Tempietto di Flora.

=== 1771 and after ===
Piermarini continued to work for the Archduke Ferdinand in the 1770s, designing residences for him in both city and country, including the conversion (1770–78) of the old Palazzo Ducale in the heart of Milan and the creation of the Villa Regio-Ducale (1776–80) at Monza. In both works Piermarini employed a U-shaped plan to create a forecourt, although this is slightly irregular in the Milan building because of the pre-existing structure. The façades are neither monumental nor dramatic but are instead a refinement of Vanvitelli’s style. The interior decorations complement the simple linear quality of the exterior and serve to emphasize the rhythmic cadences of the window openings and create on the ceilings a light, elastic pattern that, by utilizing the gentle curves of the vaults, leaves space for frescoed medallions. The team in which Piermarini worked as architect, with Giocondo Albertolli responsible for stuccowork, Giuseppe Franchi for sculpture, and Giulio Traballesi and Martin Knoller for painting, provided the same service for the Lombard nobility who wanted to emulate the archducal court in refurbishing their own residences. Piermarini’s designs for the Palazzo Belgioioso (1772–82) included an enormous frontage divided by rhythmic groups of gigantic pilasters above a ground-floor of smooth ashlar-work and with a slight projection of the central bays decorated with half-columns and a pediment. Other palaces at which Piermarini worked include the Palazzo of Antonio Greppi in Via Sant’Antonio (1777–82), where, by toning down all the plastic components such as window moulding, he accentuated the design value of the building surface. Similar works from the years 1775–8 include the garden front of the Palazzo Cusani, the restoration of Palazzo Moriggia, and the Palazzo Casnedi, as well as the Villa Borromeo (1780–85) at Cassano d’Adda. He also designed the Villa Tittoni Traversi (1776–1779) at Desio.

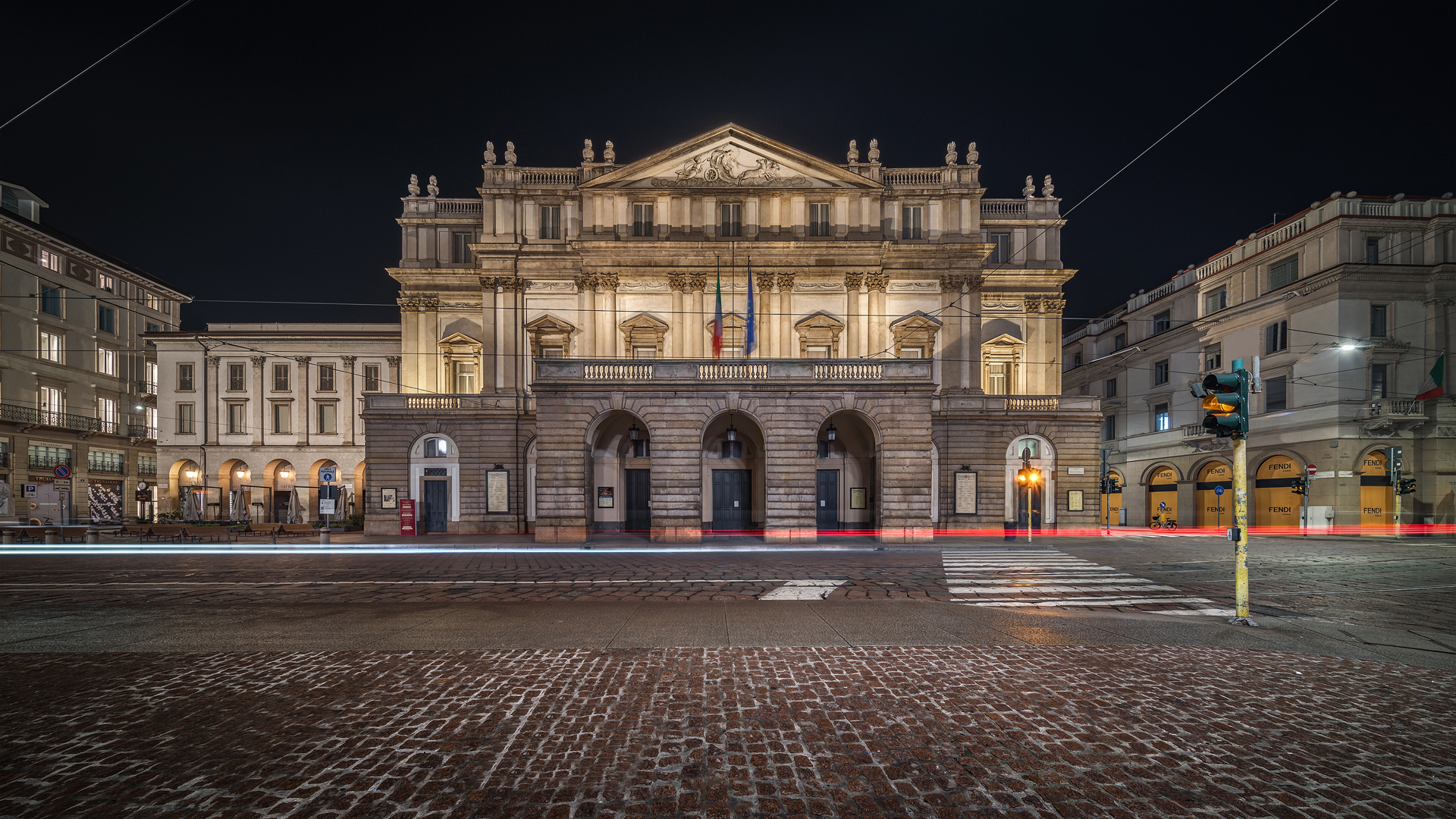
Teatro alla Scala, Milan

Between 1776 and 1778 Piermarini constructed his best-known work, the Teatro alla Scala in Milan, built for a group of theatre box-holders that included almost all the nobles of the city. The auditorium follows the lines of the traditional Italian opera house of the 18th century. Six tiers of private boxes arranged on a horseshoe plan encompass an open pit, and they are joined to the proscenium arch by giant Corinthian columns framing stage boxes. In the original auditorium, relief decoration was kept to a minimum for acoustic reasons. Instead the boxes were fronted with painted decoration on lightly plastered wooden panels. Alessandro Sanquirico entirely redecorated the auditorium in 1830 (destr.; rebuilt 1946). A covered portico is the most prominent element on an otherwise understated façade. The central bays are accentuated with a series of attached Corinthian columns, and a triangular pediment above the attic storey frames a low relief of the Chariot of Apollo by Giuseppe Franchi. Piermarini also designed other theatres, including those of Novara (1777), Monza (1778), Mantua (1782–3) and Crema (1783–5; destr.). Piermarini had a significant influence on the appearance of Milan through his work on the renovation of civic buildings such as the Palazzo del Monte di Santa Teresa (1782), La Zecca (the Mint; 1778–80 ) and the boys’ orphanage (1775–80) in San Pietro in Gessate. At the Palazzo Brera he designed the spacious hall of the public library (1780). In 1776 he was appointed professor of architecture at the Brera Academy, and in 1777 he was made responsible for all new buildings and refurbishments following the introduction of the Nuovo piano delle strade by the Empress Maria Theresa of Austria. He was also made responsible for urban improvements on a much greater scale, from the creation of the city's first public gardens, or boschetti (1782), on the Corso di Porta Orientale (now Corso Venezia), to the arrangement of shops in Piazza dell'Arcivescovado (now Piazza Fontana), which was also adorned with a public fountain, known as the Piermarini Fountain, designed by Piermarini and built by Franchi. After the arrival of French troops in Milan (1796), Piermarini remained for some time at his tasks, even planning the Arco della Riconoscenza and urban decorations for the Feste della Federazione of July 1797. Later, however, he returned to Foligno, where in addition to such architectural works as the Teatro di Matelica (1803–12) he effected some changes in the Duomo and prepared a project for the Cappella del Sacramento in the church of San Lorenzo at Spello. Piermarini died in Foligno in 1808.

Among his pupils was Giacomo Albertolli, the nephew of Piermarini's collaborator in stucco decoration of palaces, Giocondo Albertolli. Giacomo succeeded him as professor of architecture in the Brera Academy.

== Writings ==
- Teatro della Scala in Milano: Architettura del regio professore Piermarini (Milan, 1789; repr. Perugia, 1976).

== Select works ==
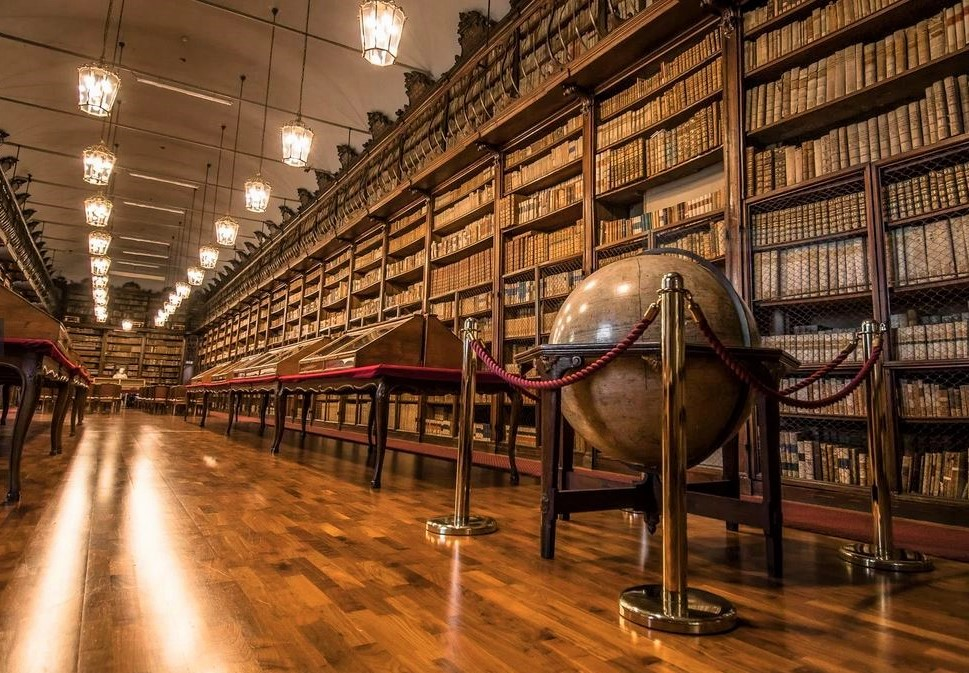
The library of the University of Pavia, 1772

- Old Campus of the University of Pavia (1771-1773)
- Palazzo Greppi in Milan (1772-1778)
- Palazzo Belgioioso (1772-1781)
- Teatro Bibiena in Mantua (1773-1775)
- Royal Palace of Milan (1773-1778)
- Palazzo Cusani in Milan (1775-1779)
- Palazzo Moriggia in Milan (1775)
- La Scala (1776-1778)
- Royal Villa of Monza (1776-1780)
- Church of Saints Gervasio and Protasio in Parabiago (1780)
- Villa Borromeo (1780-85) in Cassano d’Adda
- Teatro di Matelica in Foligno (1803-12)
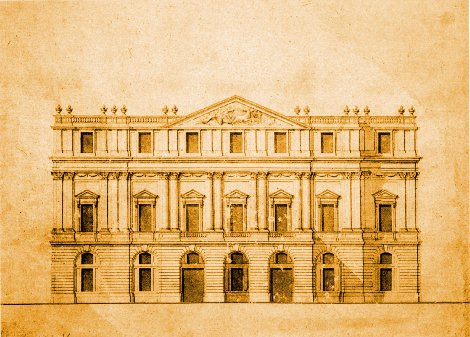
Teatro alla Scala: Design from 1779

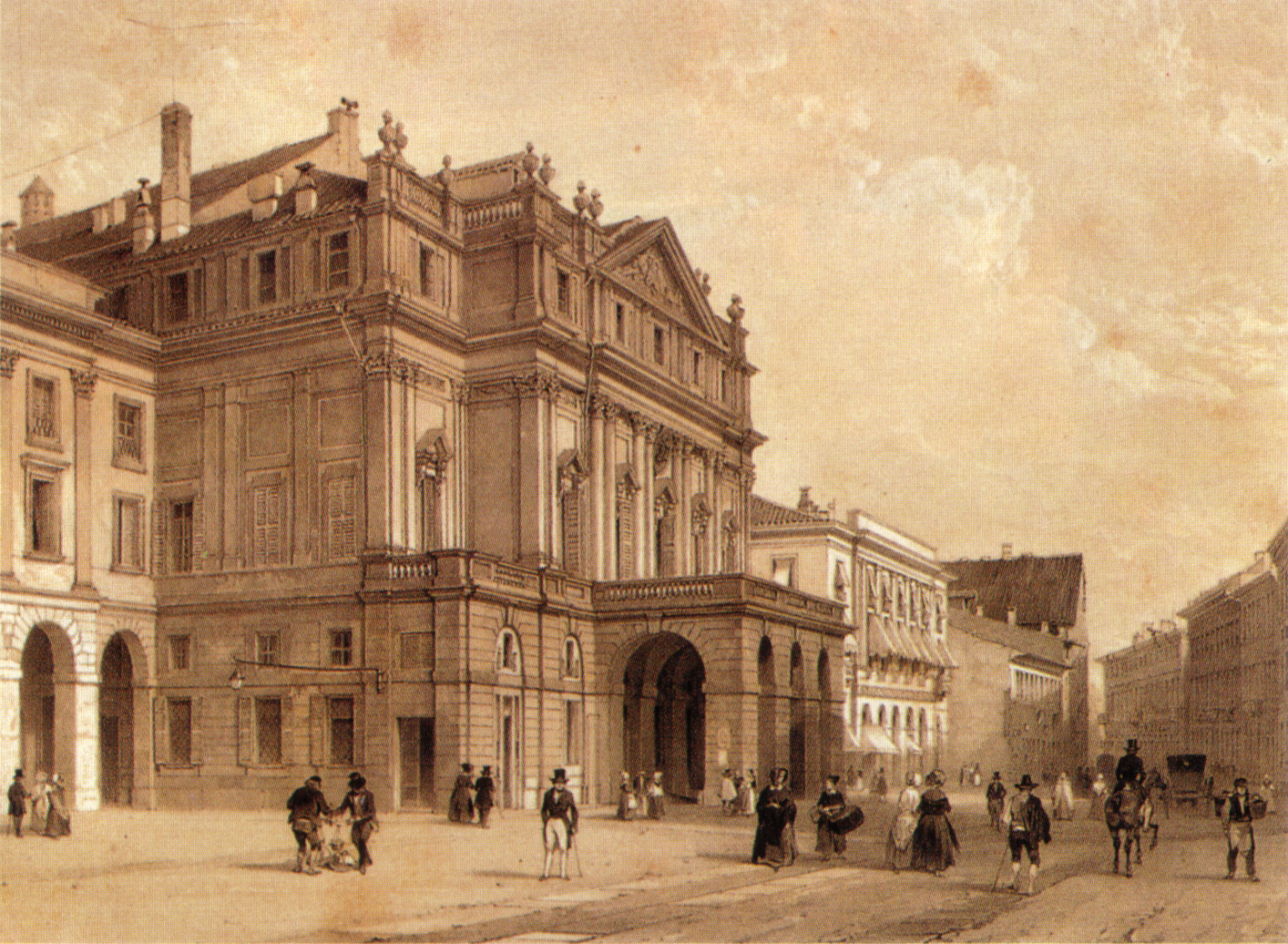
Teatro alla Scala in the 19th century

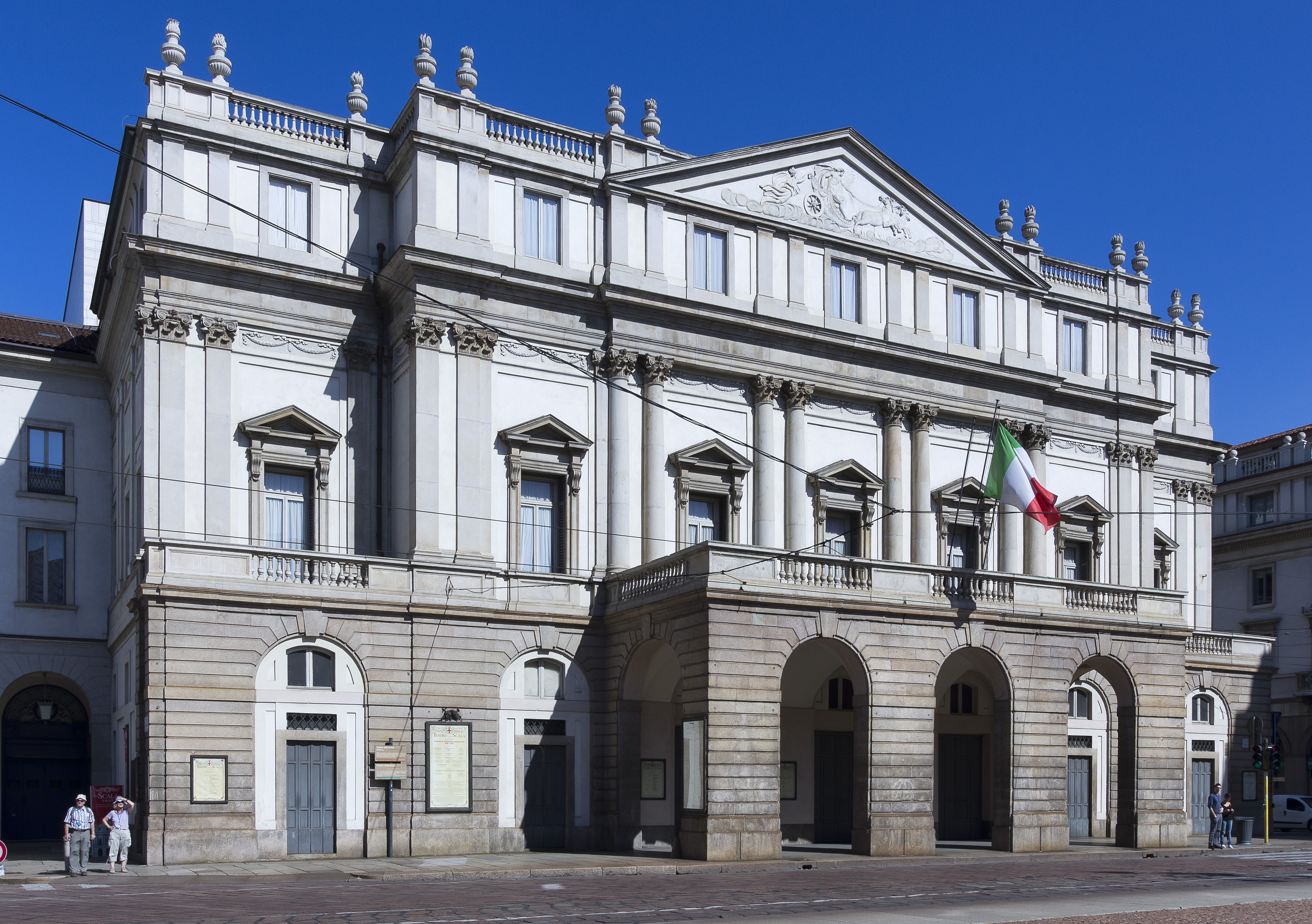
Teatro alla Scala

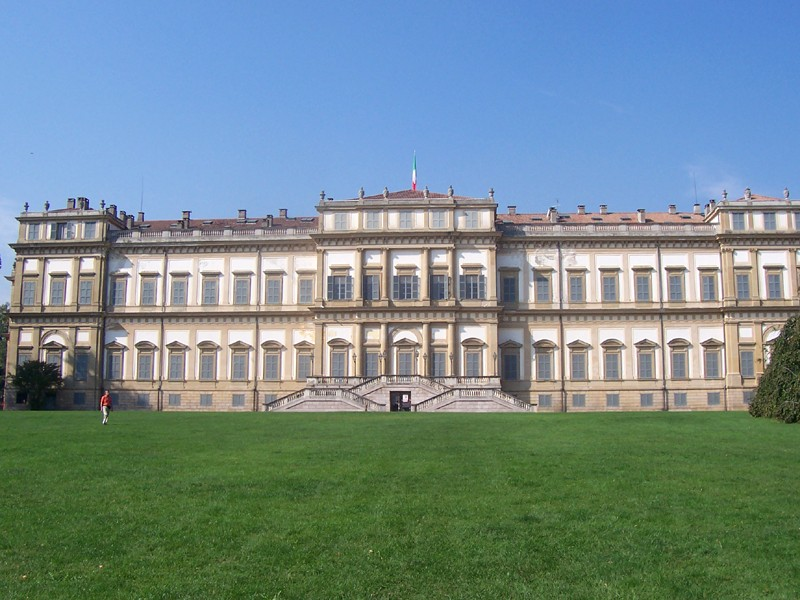
Royal Villa of Monza

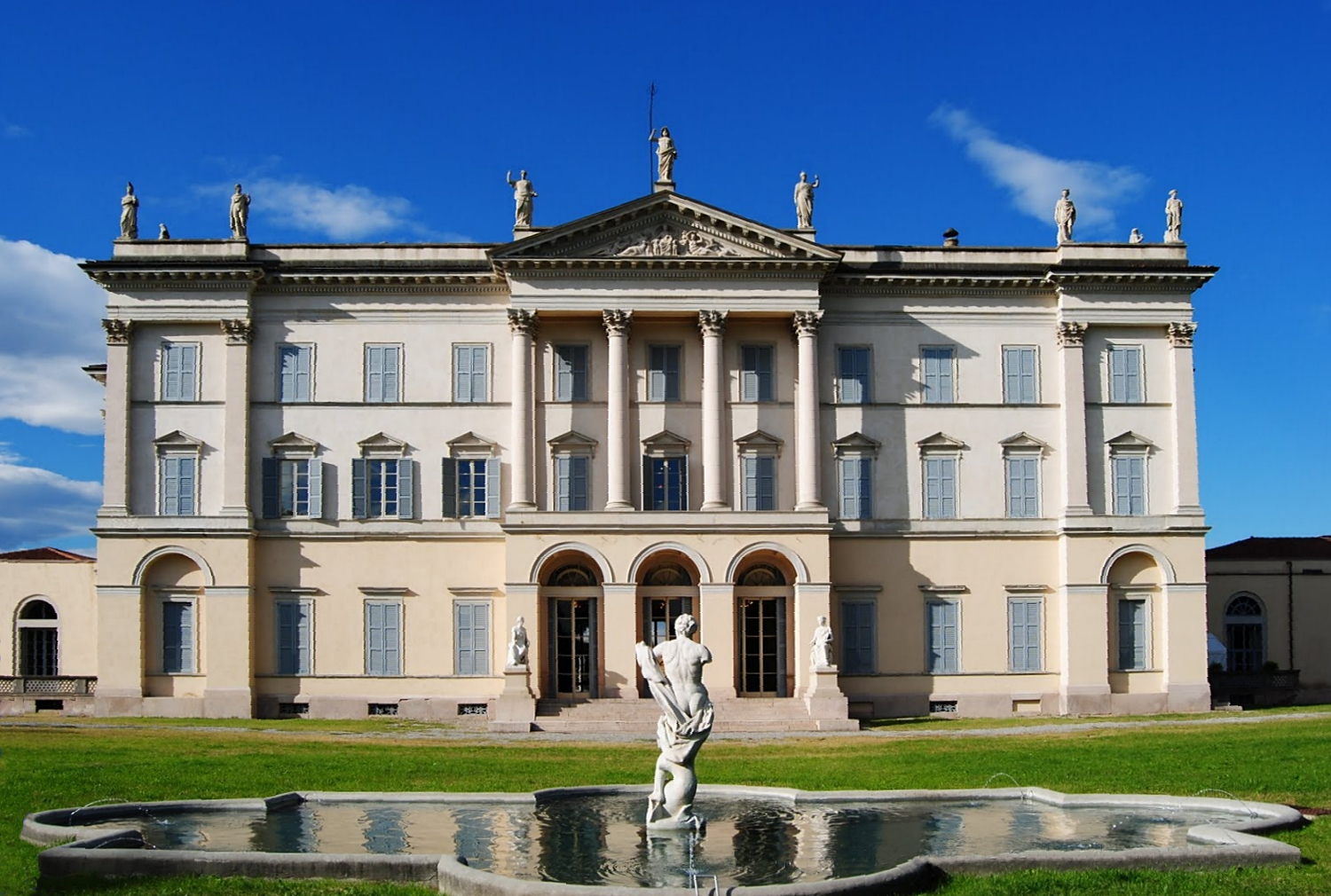
Villa Tittoni Traversi

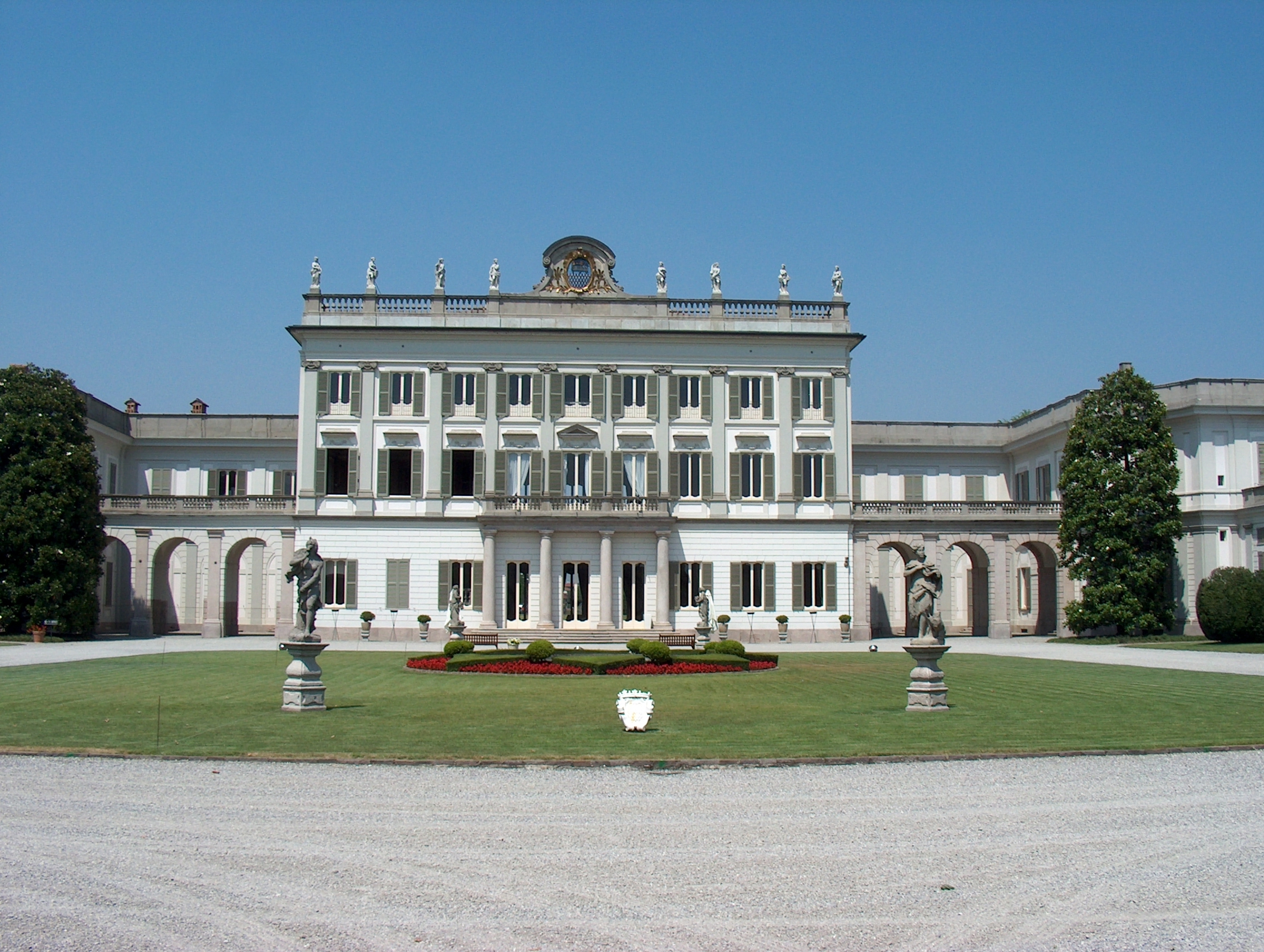
Villa Borromeo at Cassano d’Adda

== Bibliography ==
- Filippini, E. (1936). Giuseppe Piermarini nella vita e nelle opere. Foligno: T. Sbrozzi e Figlio.
- Grassi, L. (1961). "Disposizione, misura, euritmia nell'opera del Piermarini e la villa di Cassano d'Adda". Arte Lombarda. 6 (1): 85–103. JSTOR 43106750.
- Mezzanotte, G. (1966). Architettura neoclassica in Lombardia. Naples: EST. pp. 81–132.
- Brizio, A. M. (1975). "Il rinnovamento urbanistico di Milano nella seconda metà del settecento". Nuove idee e nuova arte nel '700 italiano. Rome. pp. 361–408.
- Ricci, G. (1975). "Il Piermarini e i teatri neoclassici in Lombardia". Bollettino del Centro internazionale di studi di architettura Andrea Palladio. 17: 293–303.
- Doria, A. (1978). "Caratteri e novità dell'edilizia privata del Piermarini a Milano". Annali della Facoltà di filosofia e lettere dell'Università di Milano. 31: 409–27.
- Belluzzi, A. (1980). "Giuseppe Piermarini e Le Teorie Dell'architettura". Prospettiva. 23 (23): 83–89. JSTOR 24419956.
- Mezzanotte, G. (1982). L'architettura della Scala nell'età neoclassica. Milan: Il polifilo.
- Cesarini, D. (1983). "Giuseppe Piermarini, architetto neoclassico: Saggio bibliografico". Giuseppe Piermarini e il suo tempo. Foligno: Electa.
- Scotti, A. (1984). Lo stato e la città: Architetture, istituzioni e funzionari nella Lomabardia illuminista. Milan: Franco Angeli.
- Ganna, A.; Pisaroni, M. (1998). "Disegni Di Piermarini per La Riforma Di Brera". Arte Lombarda. 122 (1): 67–77. JSTOR 43106314.
