= Fero =

Fero or Feró is a given name and family name, and may refer to:

== Given name ==
=== Fero ===
Fero is a nickname for Ferario and František:

- Ferario Spasov (born 1962), Bulgarian football coach and manager
- Fero, Kosovo-Albanian rapper
- František Velecký (1934–2003), Slovak actor

Fero is a nickname for Farzad. Fero47 is a German rapper.

=== Feró ===
Feró is a Hungarian nickname for Ferenc:

- Feró Nagy (born 1946), Hungarian rock singer and musician

== Family name ==
- Ken Fero, a UK documentary filmmaker and political activist

== Novel ==
- Fero, a Gujarati novel written by Radheshyam Sharma

== Ships ==
- Ferö, an occasional spelling of the Danish ship Færøe

== See also ==
- Faroe (disambiguation)
- Ferro (disambiguation)
