= Dibachi =

Dibachi is a surname. Notable people with the surname include:

- Farzad Dibachi, American businessman
- Rhonda Dibachi, American businesswoman
