= Farzad =

Farzad (Persian: فرزاد) is a masculine given name of Persian origin. Notable people with the name include:

== Given name ==
- Farzad Abdollahi (born 1990), Iranian taekwondo practitioner
- Farzad Ashoubi (born 1985), Iranian footballer
- Farzad Baher (born 1993), Iranian saber fencer
- Farzad Bazoft (1958–1990), Iranian-born British journalist
- Farzad Bonyadi (born 1959), Iranian poker player
- Farzad Dibachi, Iranian-American entrepreneur and business executive
- Farzad Esmaili (born 1972), Iranian military officer
- Farzad Farzin (born 1981), Iranian singer and actor
- Farzad Fattahi (born 1980), Iranian songwriter, documentary maker, and TV Producer
- Farzad Hassani (born 1977), Iranian television presenter, actor, and poet
- Farzad Hatami (born 1986), Iranian footballer
- Farzad Hosseinkhani (born 1981), Iranian footballer
- Farzad Houshidari (born 1987), Iranian ice hockey player
- Farzad Jafari (born 1993), Iranian footballer
- Farzad Kamangar (1978–2010), Iranian Kurdish teacher and human rights activist
- Farzad Majidi (born 1977), Iranian footballer
- Farzad Mansouri (born 2002), Afghan taekwondo practitioner
- Farzad Mohammadi (born 1987), Iranian footballer
- Farzad Mostashari (born 1968/69) Iranian-American public health doctor
- Farzad Motamen (born 1957), Iranian film director
- Farzad Mousakhani (born 1981), Iranian strongman
- Farzad Nazem (born 1961), Iranian-American executive and businessman
- Farzad Pour Rahimian (born 1977), Iranian-British scholar of digital engineering and manufacturing
- Farzad Sepahvand (born 1986), Iranian Paralympian athlete
- Farzad Sharifian (1964–2020), Iranian-Australian linguist
- Farzad Tarash (born 1986), Iranian-Australian freestyle wrestler
