= Death of Joy Gardner =

Death in police custody

- Joy Gardner
- Date: 1 August 1993
- Location: Crouch End, London, England, UK
- Cause: Cerebral hypoxia, cardiac arrest
- Burial: Lavender Hill Cemetery, Enfield, London, England, UK.
- Accused: Detective Sergeant Linda Evans; Detective Constable John Burrell; Detective Constable Colin Whitby
- Charges: Manslaughter
- Verdict: DC Burrell cleared on the orders of the judge. DS Evans and DC Whitby found not guilty.

Joy Angelia Gardner (née Burke; 29 May 1953 – 1 August 1993) was a 40-year-old Jamaican mature student living in London, England, United Kingdom. Gardner died after being detained during a police immigration raid on her home in Crouch End, when she was restrained with handcuffs and leather straps and gagged with a 13 ft (4.0 m) length of adhesive tape wrapped around her head. Unable to breathe, she collapsed and suffered brain damage due to asphyxia. She was placed on life support but died following a cardiac arrest four days later. In 1995, three of the police officers involved stood trial for Gardner's manslaughter, but were acquitted.

The case became a cause célèbre for civil rights and justice campaigners, and for the first time brought wide public attention to what the Modern Law Review called "the inhumanity of the methods used routinely in the execution of deportation orders". Despite continuing pressure by campaigners, no coroner's inquest or public inquiry into the circumstances of Gardner's death has been held.

== Background ==
=== Joy Gardner ===
Joy Gardner was born Joy Burke in Long Bay Beach, Jamaica, in May 1953. Her mother, Myrna Simpson, emigrated to the United Kingdom from Jamaica – then still a British colony – in 1961, with the intention of sending for her child once she had achieved some financial stability, a common and accepted practice at the time. Simpson subsequently became a British citizen. Prior to 1981, Gardner would have had the right to British citizenship through her mother, but changes to immigration legislation in the British Nationality Act 1981 meant this was no longer possible. As well as her mother, Gardner's half-brother, three uncles and two aunts were also living in England at the time.

Gardner first travelled to England in 1987, leaving a daughter behind in Jamaica. She entered the country legally using a six-month visitor's visa, but overstayed when the visa elapsed. She was pregnant at the time of her arrival, and subsequently gave birth to a son. In September 1990 she married Briton John Gardner, who applied to the Home Office for his new wife to be granted permanent residence. Five weeks later they separated and he withdrew the request.

In October 1990, Gardner was advised by police and the Home Office that she should leave the country voluntarily or risk deportation. In December 1990 she applied for a judicial review of her case which was turned down in April 1991. A notice of intention to deport was served on her in October 1991, which she subsequently appealed. During the appeal process a restriction order was applied requiring her to report regularly to local police. The Immigration Appeals Tribunal denied the appeal and a deportation order was issued in April 1992. Gardner was interviewed by immigration officials again in early June 1992, and reported to Stoke Newington police station later that month. A flight to Jamaica was arranged for Gardner in the summer of 1992, but she failed to attend at the airport, stating later that she had not received notification to do so. Her solicitor Djemal Dervish lodged a further appeal, citing "compelling compassionate circumstances".

While living in the UK, Gardner moved home several times but remained in contact with the police, her mother's local MP Bernie Grant and immigration services. By the summer of 1993 she was studying Media Studies at London Guildhall University and living in a housing association home in Topsfield Close, Crouch End. On 28 July 1993, the day the police raided Gardner's home, Charles Wardle's immigration officer procrastinated to serve deportation order to Dervish her representative. Wardle, the immigration minister, later admitted that the letters were held back and timed to arrive after the raid to prevent any further judicial appeals being made and to avoid giving Gardner any notice of her deportation, which was to take place at 3.00 pm the same day from Heathrow Airport.

=== Aliens Deportation Group ===
The Metropolitan Police Service's (MPS) Aliens Deportation Group (ADG) was a specialist squad of uniformed police officers belonging to Scotland Yard's SO1(3), part of the Specialist Operations branch. The squad was composed of a Detective Inspector, a Detective Sergeant, and seven Detective Constables. They were tasked with accompanying officials from the UK Immigration Service - who had no power of arrest - who were serving deportation orders where violent resistance by the deportee was considered probable. The squad operated in groups of three, with two officers then accompanying the deportee on their flights out of the country.

== Police raid ==
At 7.40 am on 28 July 1993, three officers from the ADG, accompanied by two officers from Hornsey police station and an official from the UK Immigration Service, raided Gardner's home with orders to "detain and remove" her and her 5-year-old son for immediate deportation to Jamaica. She suffered respiratory failure almost immediately and was taken to the Whittington Hospital, North London. She died on 1 August 1993 due to cerebral hypoxia and cardiac arrest, without regaining consciousness.

== Cause of death ==
Gardner was examined by four forensic pathologists who concluded that the cause of death was cerebral hypoxia. As she had suffered a multiple head injury during the struggle samples of brain tissue were subsequently examined by an independent neuropathologist to establish whether brain injury may have caused the hypoxia rather than asphyxiation as a direct result of the gag and tape. Two further tests were then conducted by independent neuropathologists who both dismissed the head injury as a factor.

== Manslaughter trial ==
On 15 May 1995, three police officers from the ADG stood trial accused of Gardner's manslaughter. A key part of the defence case was that Gardner's death was caused by head trauma sustained as she violently resisted the officers and not as a direct result of the tape used to gag her. Paula Lannas, a forensic pathologist, testified: "There were bruises on the scalp that indicates the head had struck a hard surface. The lack of oxygen was secondary to the head injury. The brain was injured. That led to deprivation of oxygen and death. Such a swelling would lead to cardiac arrest and the deprivation of oxygen." Experts for the prosecution and other pathologists disputed Lannas' findings.

On 2 June 1995, Detective Constable John Burrell was acquitted on the directions of the judge, Mr Justice Mantell. Detective Sergeant Linda Evans and Detective Constable Colin Whitby were found not guilty by the jury on 14 June 1995. Following the trial, the Police Complaints Authority (PCA) announced that there would be no internal disciplinary inquiry. The PCA said that "a disciplinary charge of authority would in substance be the same as the criminal charge of which the officers have been acquitted" and "an officer cannot be tried on both criminal and discipline charges for the same offence".

== Aftermath ==
As a result of Gardner's death, the use of mouth gags was suspended by the Commissioner of the MPS in August 1993 and banned by Michael Howard, the Home Secretary, in January 1994.

In 1996, questions were raised about the work of Paula Lannas, the defence pathologist. During a trial at the Old Bailey in June 1998, Lannas testified that bruising on the neck of a 16-month-old child "resulted from strangulation by the mother's boyfriend." The defendant was acquitted when forensic pathologist Iain West testified that the post mortem examination had been so "cack-handed" that the bruising may have been inflicted by Lannas, and the prosecution informed the jury that her conclusions were "suspect" and could not be relied on as evidence. In May 2000, two men had their convictions for manslaughter quashed when it was disclosed that Lannas had testified at their trial that the victim had been killed by a stab wound and had no other injuries. Subsequent examination found a potentially fatal skull fracture. A 2001 disciplinary tribunal alleged that Lannas's pathology work "consistently fell substantially short" of expected standards and there were "substantive deficiencies" in "her technical approach and medical knowledge."

In February 1999 Gardner's family brought a civil suit against the police for compensation.

In July 2020 Haringey Council announced the naming of a new housing development on Templeton Road as 'Joy Gardner House'.

== In popular culture ==
The incident has been the subject of a number of poems including:

- The Death of Joy Gardner by Benjamin Zephaniah
- Teeth by Jackie Kay

== See also ==
- Death of Jimmy Mubenga
- Death of Cynthia Jarrett

== External media ==
- "Justice Denied". Migrant Media. 1995. (50 minutes) Documentary about the case. Directed by Ken Fero – via Vimeo.
