= Noribachi =

- Type: Private
- Industry: Lighting and LED technology
- Founded: 2007 in Albuquerque, United States
- Founders: Farzad and Rhonda Dibachi
- Headquarters: Harbor City, Los Angeles, United States
- Key people: Farzad Dibachi (CEO); Rhonda Dibachi (Executive chairman & CFO); Esther M. Santos (CSO); Mark Moore (CIO); Bruce Wiggins (EVP, General counsel); Rene Pharisien (VP, Worldwide Major Accounts and Strategic Partnerships
- Revenue: $23 million
- Number of employees: 170
- Website: www.noribachi.com

Noribachi is an American LED technology manufacturing company based in Harbor City, Los Angeles. The company specializes in clean lighting technology for industrial and commercial applications within the agricultural, automotive, educational, healthcare, hospitality, manufacturing, sports and transportation categories. It was the first company to introduce stadium-quality LED lighting.

Noribachi has been included on Inc. Magazine's Inc. 5000, it was considered the 7th fastest growing private business in Los Angeles in 2014 and Forbes has named Noribachi one of "America's Most Promising Companies" for two consecutive years in 2014 and 2015.

== History ==
Noribachi was founded in 2007 by Rhonda and Farzad Dibachi. The couple initially met while working for General Electric and later established a technology company together, Niku Corporation. The Dibachi's took the company public in 2000 and it was acquired by Computer Associates in 2003. Both Rhonda and Farzad Dibachi held positions at Oracle prior to founding Niku.

In 2006, the Dibachi's moved to New Mexico and launched Noribachi the following year. The company has launched various technology startup companies including Green by Design, an education website about green products, and Regen Inc., a solar electronics marketing and manufacturing firm where Farzad Dibachi served as director. In February 2010, Noribachi launched a solar panel manufacturing company called Solar Distinction Inc. Noribachi also started Visible Light Solar Technologies, where Dibachi served as director, to manufacture and market lights, as well as Qnuru to design and market the light features.

The company relocated its headquarters from Albuquerque, New Mexico to California in 2012. It is now located in Harbor City in the southern region of Los Angeles. In 2015 the company reached a partnership agreement with Samsung Electronics.

== Operations ==
Noribachi operates a 90,000 square foot manufacturing facility that produces LED lighting products. Noribachi custom manufactures 100 percent of its lights from its Los Angeles facility. The company’s LED products are produced for high output commercial and industrial facilities in various industries including agriculture, automotive, commercial, educational, hospitality and others. In 2015, Noribachi expanded its product line to include linear-style LED light fixtures, additions to the hazardous LED lighting line, and the introduction of a new wireless control capability. In 2016, the company introduced LED color changing floodlights.

The company holds several patents and has over 8,500 lighting installations. Its clients include companies such as Transportation Security Administration (TSA), Sandia Resort and Casino, Mercedes-Benz and Lexus. In 2014, Inc. Magazine ranked Noribachi as one of the fastest-growing private companies in the country, and the 17th best manufacturing company. In 2015, Noribachi ranked among the top 500 fastest growing companies after experiencing a 1,973 percent three-year growth rate, according to Inc. Magazine and ranked 47th on the Deloitte Technology Fast 500 list. Noribachi was included in Entrepreneur Magazine’s Entrepreneur360 in 2015.

== See also ==
- Farzad Dibachi
- Rhonda Dibachi
- LED
