= Lavender Hill Cemetery =

Cemetery in London, England

Coordinates: 51°40′01″N 0°5′42″W

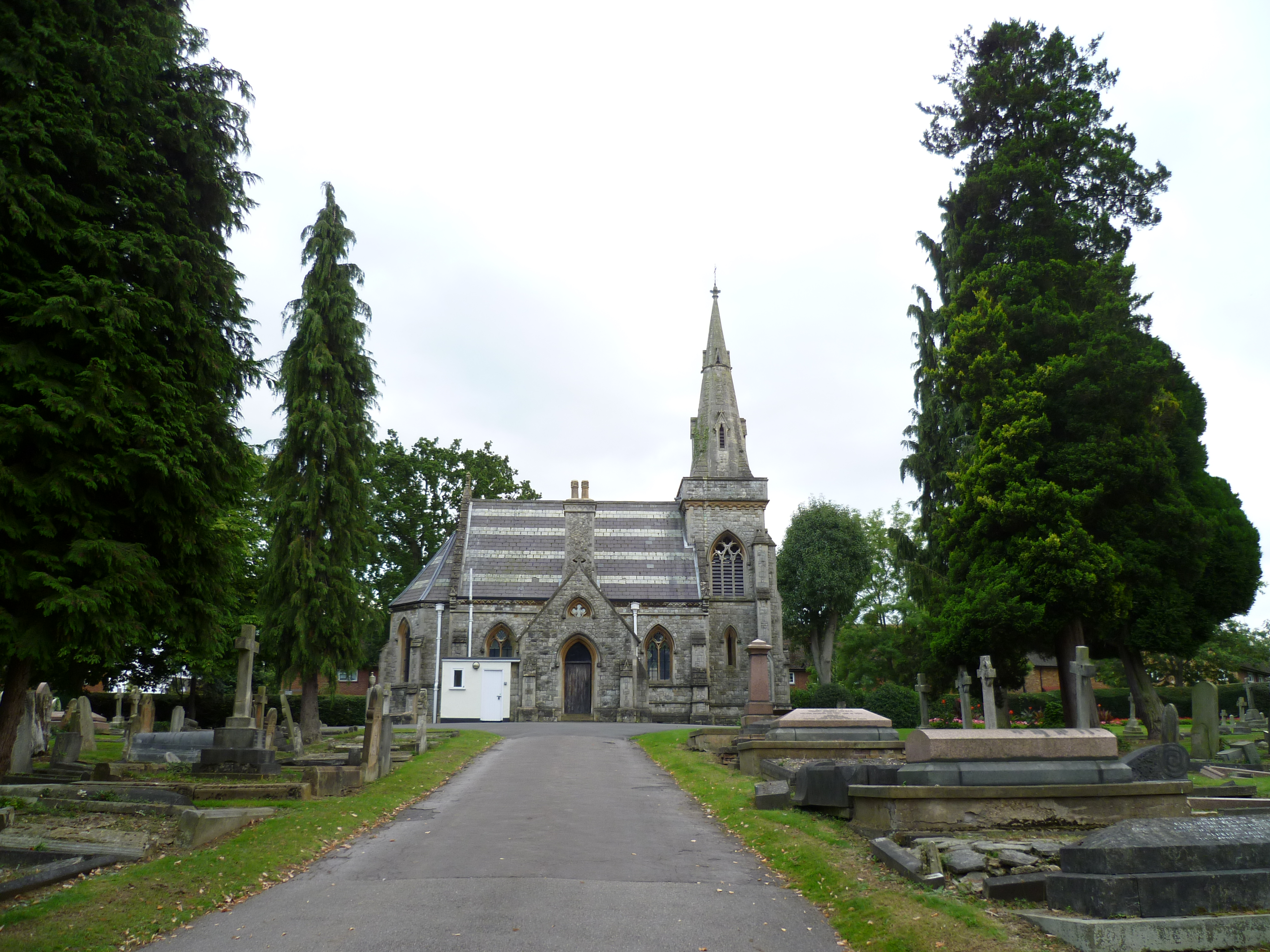
The Lavender Hill Cemetery Anglican chapel, one of two chapels in the grounds.

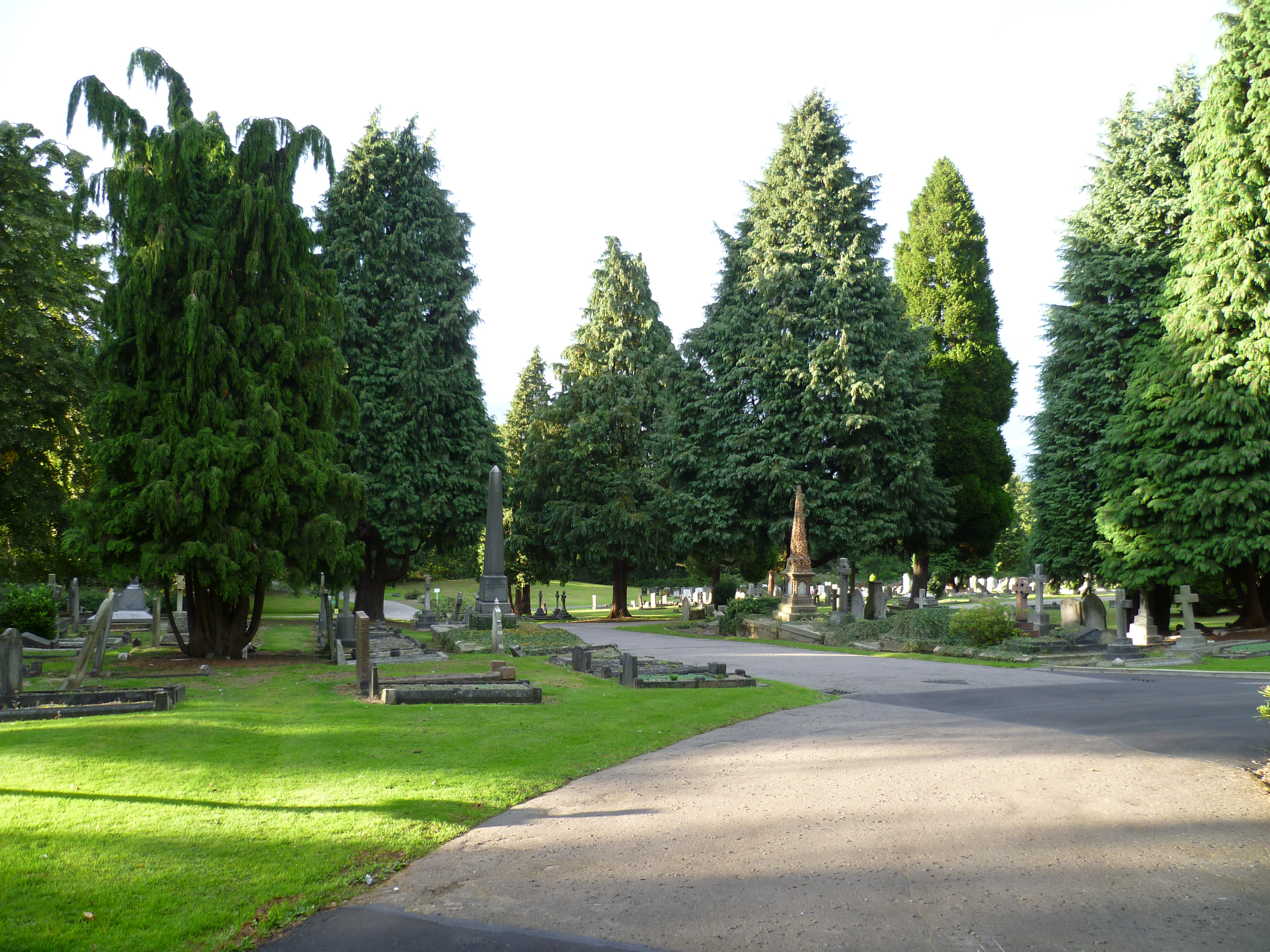
Lavender Hill Cemetery graves.

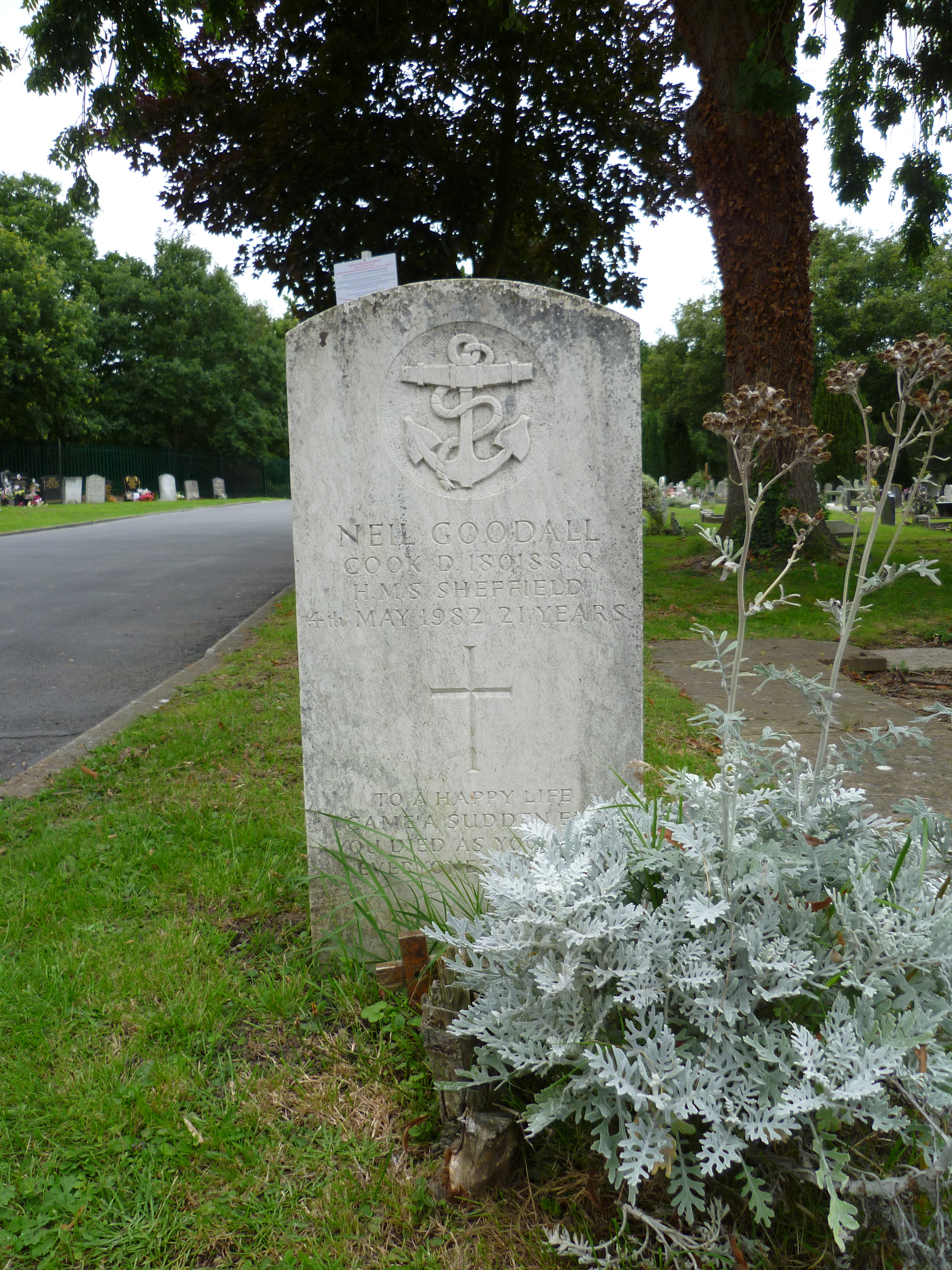
Grave of Neil Goodall who died on HMS Sheffield in 1982.

Lavender Hill Cemetery is a cemetery in Cedar Road, Enfield, London, administered by the London Borough of Enfield. The cemetery opened in 1872 and has two facing chapels inside the entrance, one for Anglicans and another for non-conformists. The gates to the cemetery featured in all but the final episode of British sitcom On the Buses as the terminus of Stan and Jack's bus route: 'Cemetery Gates'.

== Creation and design ==
The Lavender Hill Burial Board was created in 1871 and the cemetery was opened in 1872. The site includes a sandstone lodge and gateway and two facing gothic chapels designed by Thomas J. Hill, one for Anglicans and another for non-conformists, the latter subsequently turned into a store. The grounds were laid out on a serpentine scheme with many trees near the entrance on the south side. Today the grounds total 28 acres (11.3 ha) plus a 12-acre (4.8 ha) extension known as the Strayfield Road Cemetery which opened in 1997.

== Management ==
The cemetery is administered by the London Borough of Enfield. It has experienced difficulties due to poor ground conditions and in 2013, subsidence was blamed by Enfield borough on water saturation.

== Notable interments ==
- James Whatman Bosanquet of Claysmore (d. 1877) Large chest tomb. Instrumental in the building of St John the Baptist Church at Clay Hill.
- Bernard Bosanquet (cricketer) (1877-1936), invented the googly tactic in cricket.
- Heinrich Faulenbach
- Joy Gardner (1953–1993) Jamaican student.
- Neil Goodall (d. 1982) Cook on HMS Sheffield who died during the Falklands War following an Argentine attack.
- Kimble Mathews (d. 1985) Only British victim of the Japan Air Lines Flight 123 crash.
- Georgina Twells (d. 1898) and Philip Twells, M.P. (d. 1880)
- William Watson (1868–1917) of Rowanburn, Dumfries. Freeman of the City of London, along with his widow, Harriet Watson (d. 1918) – both of Spanish Flu.

The Commonwealth War Graves Commission record 92 men as buried at Lavender Hill, 33 from the First World War and 57 from the Second World War. A group of twelve exist in section Z with the rest located throughout the cemetery.

== Gallery ==
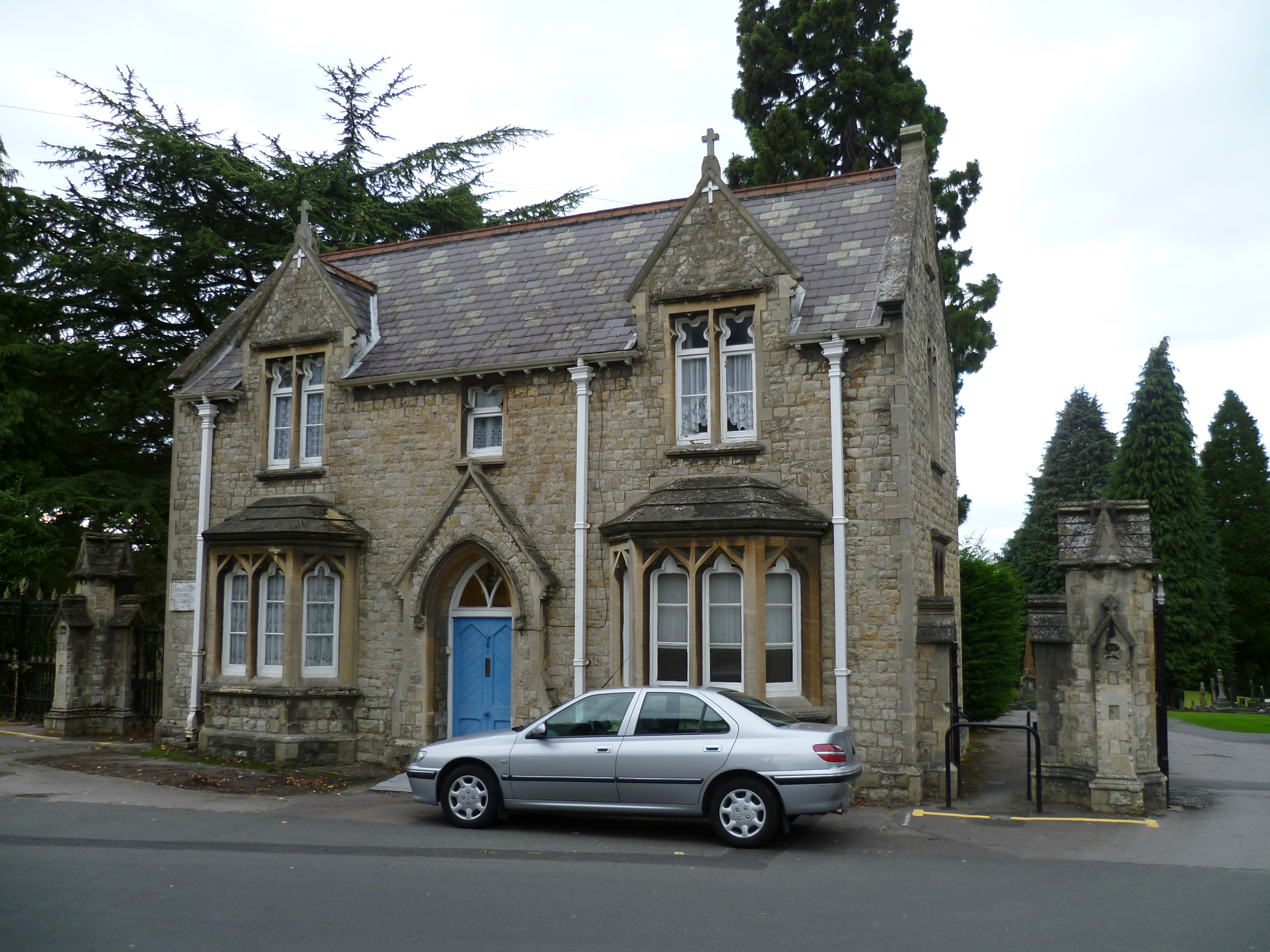
Entrance lodge.

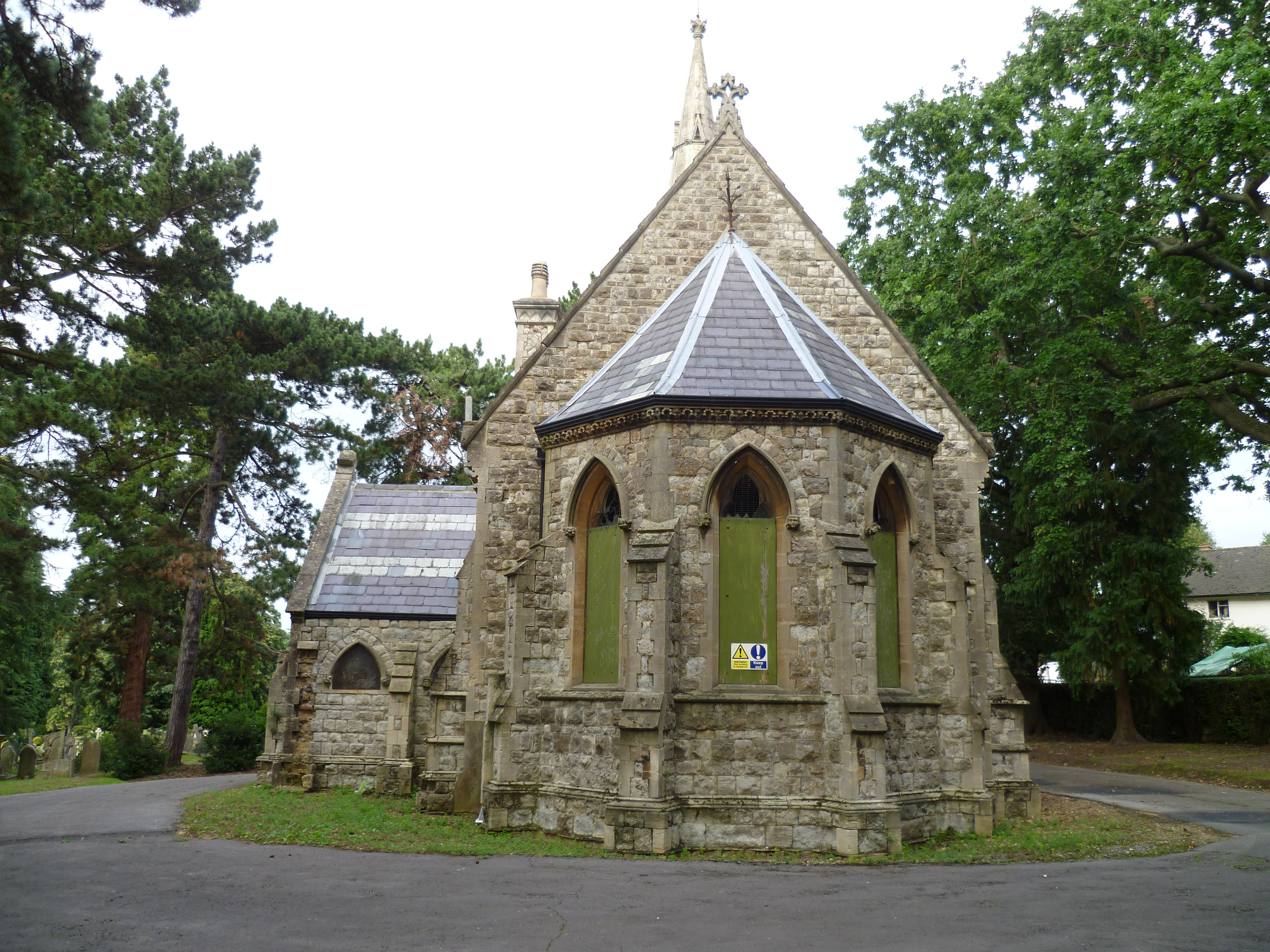
Disused non-conformist chapel.

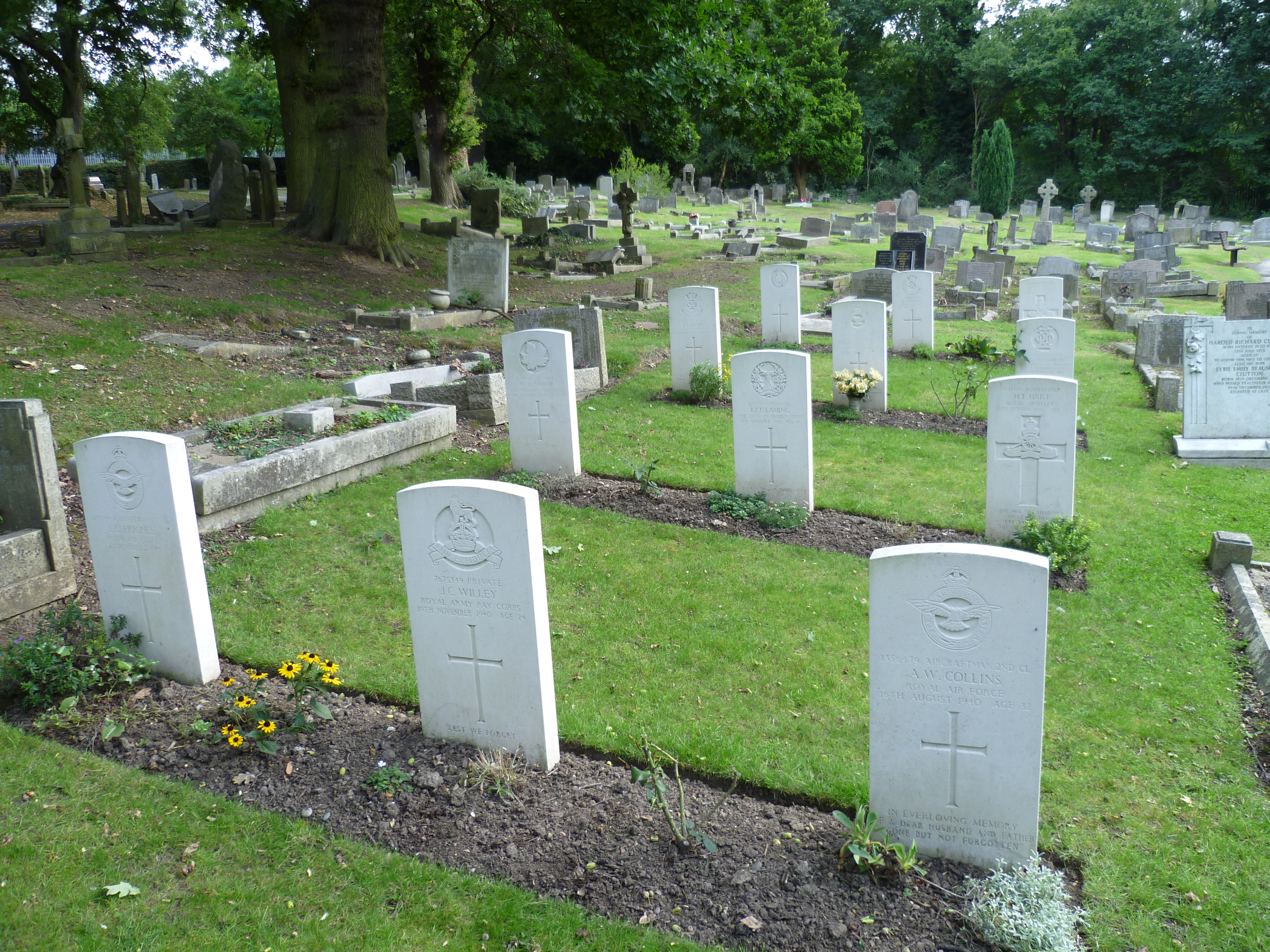
War graves, section Z.

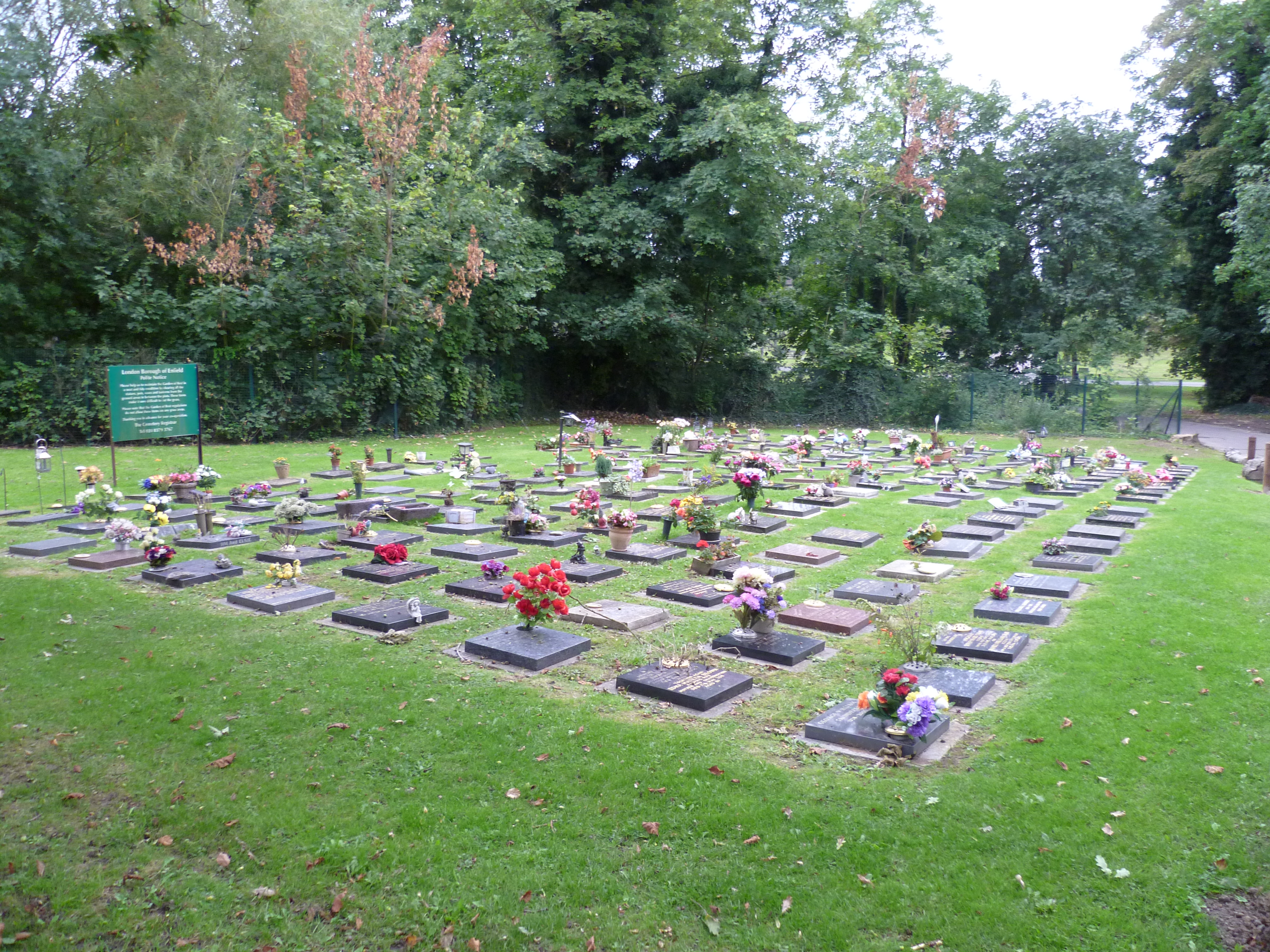
Memorial garden.

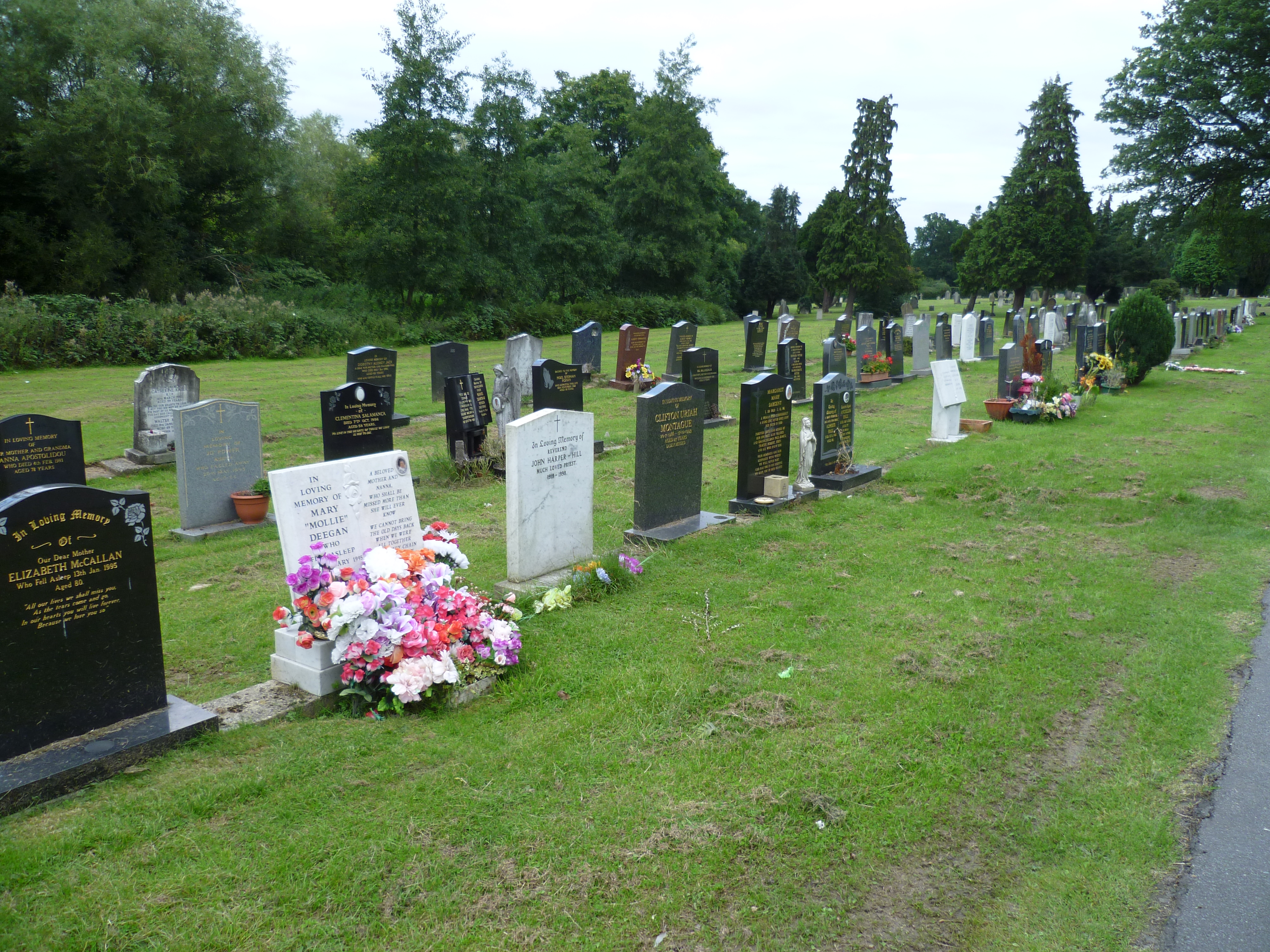
Recent graves.
