= Fero47 =

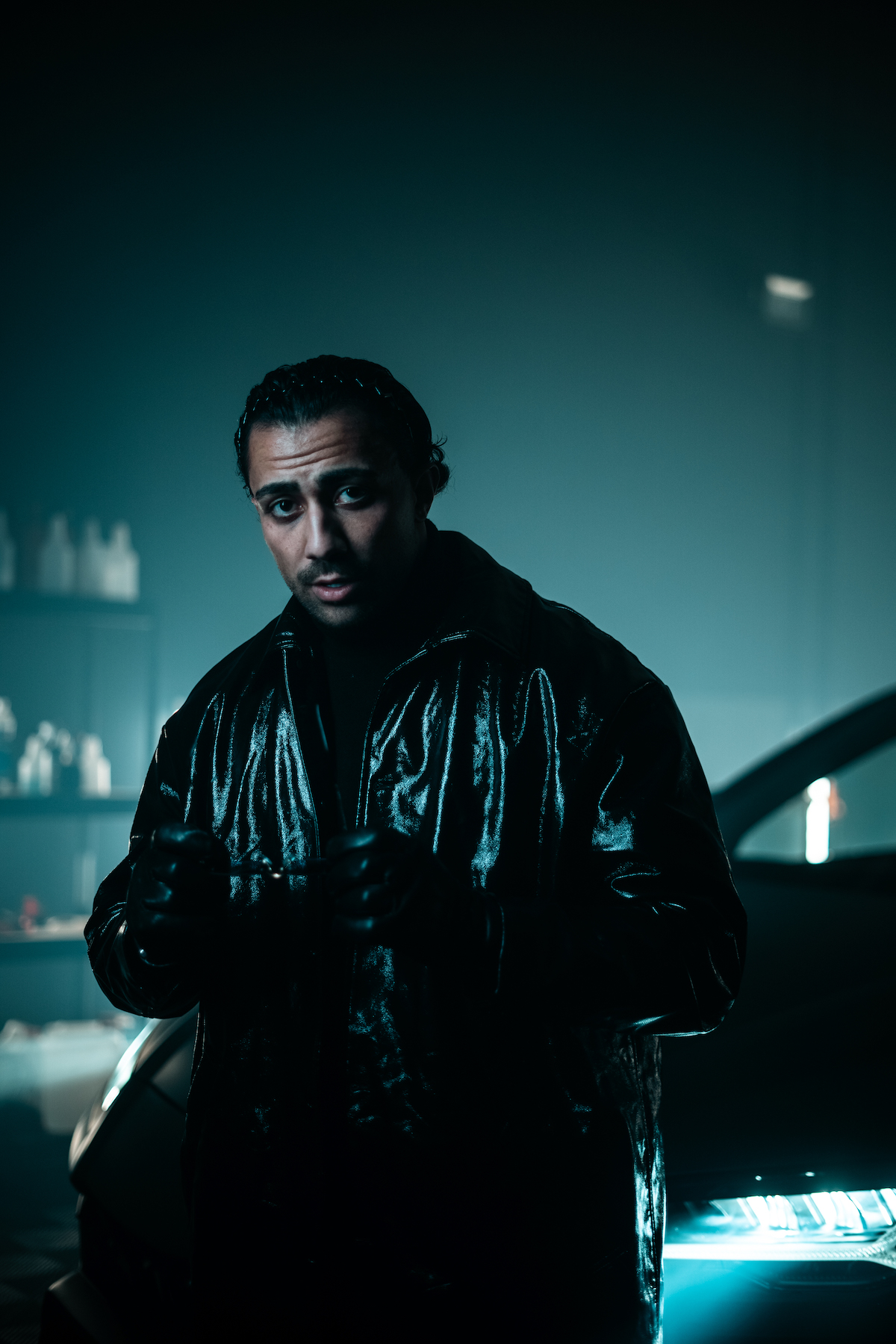
- Fero in 2023

Background information
- Born: Ferhat Tuncel; 16 May 1998 (age 27); Bad Pyrmont, Germany
- Origin: Bad Pyrmont
- Genres: Hip hop
- Occupations: Rapper; songwriter
- Instrument: Vocals
- Years active: 2018–present
- Label: Epic

Ferhat Tuncel (born 16 May 1998), known professionally as Fero47, is a German rapper and songwriter of Kurdish origin. He became famous through posting musical videos on social media. In 2019, he signed to Epic Records and released his debut single "Jaja", which has reached at top 10 in the German singles chart. Fero released his debut album, 47 in late 2019.

== Early life ==
His parents, of Kurdish descent, emigrated from Turkey (Midyat in Mardin Province) to Germany. Tuncel grew up in Bad Pyrmont with his seven siblings. In 2015 he moved to Frankfurt to do an apprenticeship as a banker, which he did not finish.

At the age of 15, Fero began recording videos of himself rapping, which he uploaded first on Facebook and later on Instagram. By 2018 he reached 150,000 followers on Instagram. The 47 in his stage name refers to the vehicle registration plate of Mardin, where he originated. He has said that he is following his father's footsteps and it is important to him that the people who listen to his music also know who he is and where he comes from.

== Career ==
In December 2018, Fero announced the release of his debut single, which however was postponed by a few weeks because of a car accident he was involved in together with his manager. The debut single, "Jaja" was released in January 2019 and reached number eight in the German singles chart. The single samples Justin Timberlake's "Cry Me a River" and was produced by SiNCH and Typhoon. After signing to Epic Records, he released his second single, "Puerto Rico", which has peaked at number seven in the German chart. In December 2019, Fero's debut album, 47 was released.

== Artistry ==
Fero, who has expressed pride in his Kurdish origin, often uses Kurdish music elements in his songs; "I just try to make sure that not too much of it is built into the music, otherwise it won't have so much to do with German rap in the end". The larynx has a special role in the voiced formation of sounds. laut.de described his voice as "distinctive", saying it is "somewhere between Bausa and Casper".

== Discography ==
=== Studio albums ===
Title	Album details	Peak chart positions		
Title	Album details	GER	AUT	SWI
47	Released: 13 December 2019; Label: Epic; Formats: CD, digital download	22	67	53

=== Singles ===
Title	Year	Peak chart positions			Certifications	Album
Title	Year	GER	AUT	SWI	Certifications	Album
"Jaja"	2019	8	17	35	BVMI: Gold; IFPI SWI: Gold	47
"Puerto Rico"	2019	7	8	17	IFPI SWI: Gold	47
"Nenene"	2019	8	13	25		47
"Wie im Traum" (with Ardian Bujupi)	2019	15	27	37	IFPI SWI: Gold	Non-album singles
"Money"	2019	45	—	—		Non-album singles
"Amphetamin"	2019	62	—	—		Non-album singles
"Schau mich an"	2019	14	31	57		47
"47"	2019	40	64	—		47
"Désolé"	2019	25	63	75		47
"Anders"	2020	27	56	—		Non-album singles
"Glück"	2020	41	—	—		Non-album singles
"Alles Cool"	2020	—	—	—		Non-album singles
"Heute Nacht" (with Keanu Silva)	2020	—	—	—		Non-album singles
"V12"	2021	—	—	—		TBA
"Pop Smoke" (with Play69)	2021	78	—	—		Non-album single
"Shake" (with Timu)	2021	—	—	—		TBA
"Swiss Feelings"	2021	—	—	—		TBA
"Wieder mal"	2021	—	—	—		TBA

“Sonnenuntergang”

“Keine Tranen” with Azzi Memo “Heimweh”
