= Rhonda Dibachi =

American business executive, entrepreneur and author

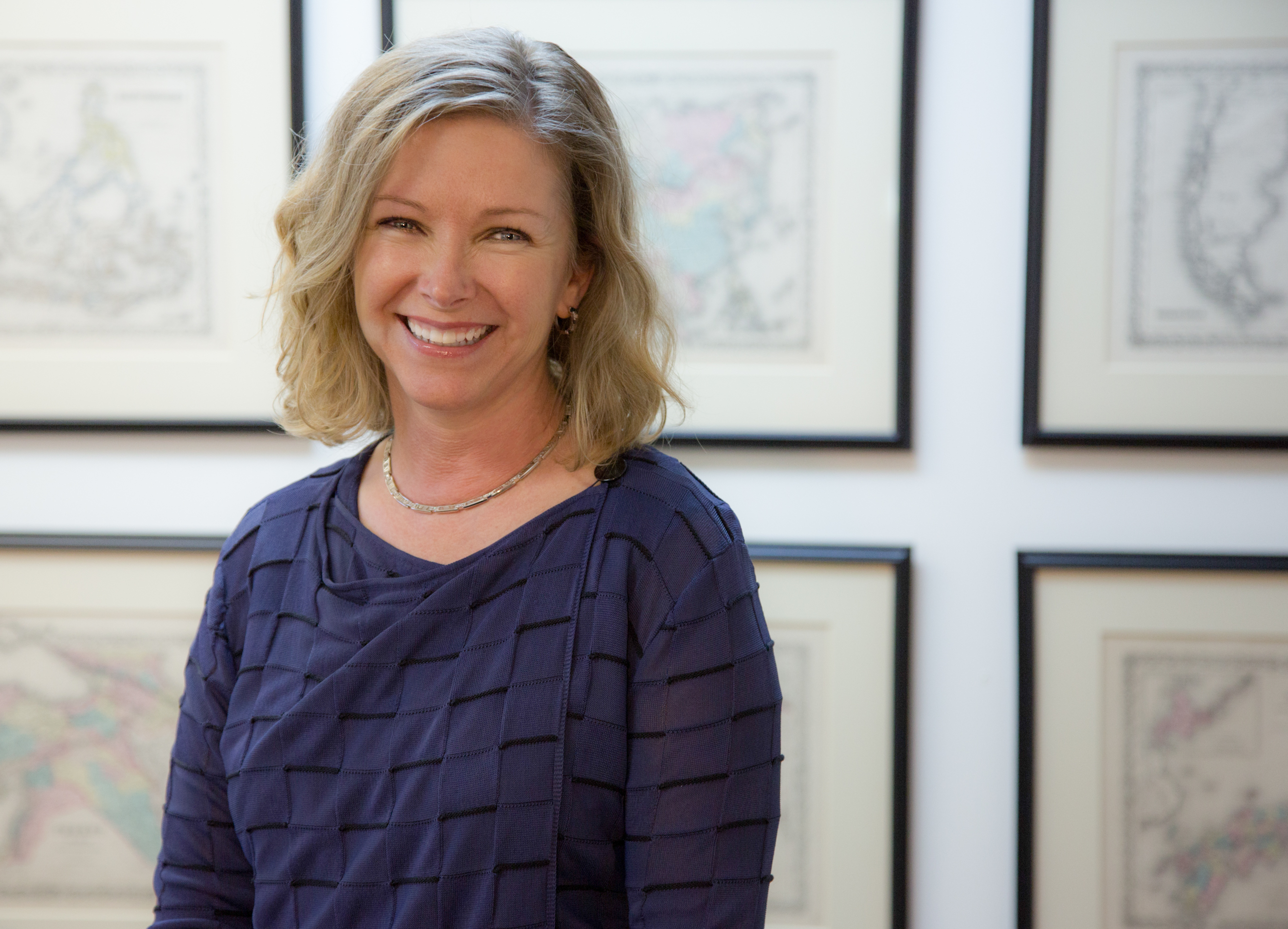
- Other name: Rhonda Love Dibachi
- Education: Northwestern University; Santa Clara University
- Occupation: Chief executive officer
- Employer: Noribachi
- Board member of: Advisory Board of the McCormick School of Engineering at Northwestern University; Board of Trustees for The Bosque School; New Mexico’s State Board of Finance
- Spouse: Farzad Dibachi

Rhonda Dibachi is an American business executive, entrepreneur and author. She is the co-founder and chief executive officer of Noribachi, a custom LED lighting manufacturer specializing in industrial and commercial applications. Prior to Noribachi, she co-founded Niku Corporation, a Silicon Valley–based infrastructure productivity software provider, with her husband Farzad Dibachi. Previously, Dibachi worked for Webvan and has been recognized as a leading female entrepreneur.

== Career ==
Dibachi graduated from Northwestern University with a Bachelor of Science degree in nuclear engineering. Later, she attended Santa Clara University where she received her MBA in 1987. Dibachi began her career as a field engineer for General Electric and later became a manufacturing consultant for Arthur Young, now known as Ernst & Young. From 1989 to 1996, she worked for Oracle Corporation in positions such as architect, development manager and director of testing for Oracle’s manufacturing applications.

Dibachi was at Webvan, a technology startup for online grocery business, from 1997 to 1998 when she left to co-found Niku Corporation. By 2000, the software management company had grown to 1,200 employees and had its initial public offering on NASDAQ led by Goldman Sachs in February that year.

In 2007, Dibachi and her husband founded Noribachi, a clean technology LED manufacturing company. She previously served as the company’s CFO. Noribachi also created and launched other solar and clean energy technologies such as Qnuru, where Dibachi served as president and CEO.

== Other activities ==
In 2002, Dibachi co-authored Just Add Management: Seven Steps to Creating a Productive Workplace and Motivating Your Employees In Challenging Times, which was published by McGraw-Hill. She has also written numerous U.S. patents.

Dibachi served on the Board of Trustees for The Bosque School, an independent K-12 education institution. She served on the Advisory Board of the McCormick School of Engineering at Northwestern University. Previously, Dibachi served on the Board of Directors of Accion New Mexico and on New Mexico’s State Board of Finance.
