= Farzad Pour Rahimian =

Digital-engineering professor and BIM–VR researcher

- Education: Integrated BSc / MSc in Architectural Engineering; PhD, Universiti Putra Malaysia
- Known for: BIM–VR integration in Architecture, Engineering and Construction; Editor-in-Chief of Smart and Sustainable Built Environment
- Awards: Bill Curtin Medal (2024)
- Scientific career
- Fields: Digital engineering; Building information modelling (BIM); Virtual and augmented reality for construction
- Workplaces: Teesside University
- Thesis: (2009)

Farzad Pour Rahimian (b. 1977) is an Iranian-born, UK-based scholar of digital engineering and manufacturing. Since August 2019 he has been Professor of Digital Engineering and Manufacturing and Centre Lead for the Centre for Sustainable Engineering at Teesside University in Middlesbrough, England. His research combines building-information modelling (BIM), extended-reality interfaces and artificial-intelligence optimisation to improve design and construction productivity.

== Early life and education ==
Pour Rahimian completed an integrated six-year BSc/MSc programme in Architectural Engineering before earning a PhD in Sustainable Architectural Studies at Universiti Putra Malaysia in 2009.

== Academic career ==
After earlier appointments in Malaysia and Scotland, Pour Rahimian joined Teesside University as a full professor in 2019, where he leads the Centre for Sustainable Engineering and co-heads the Construction Innovation & Research (CCIR) group. He is Editor-in-Chief of the Emerald journal Smart and Sustainable Built Environment and, since 2022, an Associate Editor of Elsevier's Automation in Construction. Pour Rahimian also sits on the permanent executive committee of the annual International Conference on Construction Applications of Virtual Reality (CONVR) and co-edited the proceedings of its 23rd edition in 2023.

== Research and impact ==
Working with industry partners, Pour Rahimian has developed BIM-based virtual-reality “digital-twin” platforms for design coordination, off-site manufacturing and site monitoring. He is a named inventor on UK patent GB 2584614 B, “Optimising building energy use,” granted to Arbnco Ltd in October 2021. According to the Teesside research portal he has published more than 200 scholarly outputs and his work has attracted over 4,600 citations.

== Honours ==
- **Bill Curtin Medal** (Institution of Civil Engineers, 2024) awarded for the article “Maximising the construction waste reduction potential – barriers and catalysts.”

== Selected publications ==
- Goulding, Jack Steven; Rahimian, Farzad Pour; Wang, Xiangyu (2014-09-09). "Virtual reality-based cloud BIM platform for integrated AEC projects". Journal of Information Technology in Construction (ITcon). 19 (18): 308–325.
- Sheikhkhoshkar, Moslem; Pour Rahimian, Farzad; Kaveh, Mohammad Hossein; Hosseini, M. Reza; Edwards, David J. (2019-11-01). "Automated planning of concrete joint layouts with 4D-BIM". Automation in Construction. 107 102943. doi:10.1016/j.autcon.2019.102943. ISSN 0926-5805.

== Patent ==
- GB 2584614 B – “Optimising building energy use.” Granted 13 October 2021 to Arbnco Ltd; inventor F. P. Rahimian.

== See also ==
- Building information modelling
- Virtual reality in architecture
