= Fero (rapper) =

Kosovar rapper (born 1997)

- Born: Feronit Shabani; 8 July 1997 (age 29); Germany
- Occupations: Rapper; songwriter
- Years active: 2016–2023, 2025-present
- Labels: Friends Entertainment, On Records (2016-2019, 2022)

Feronit Shabani (Albanian: [fɛɾɔˈnit ʃaˈbani]; 8 July 1997), known professionally as Fero, is a Kosovan rapper and songwriter.

== Life and career ==
Shabani was born on 8 July 1997 into an Albanian family in Germany and now lives in Kosovo In August 2019, he terminated his contract with On Records and relocated to Berlin, Germany, where he established his own music label. In the months that followed, he released four singles, including "Jom rrit" and "Habibi", both of which entered the charts in Albania. In 2023, Fero returned to making music after a 2 year hiatus, under the management of Rinor Hykolli. Outside of music, Shabani has invested in small businesses.

Shabani was in a relationship with Albanian model Arbenita Ismajli, whom he married in 2021. They welcomed a daughter in 2021. In 2023, Shabani was arrested and charged for domestic violence, which included physical assault and threats of violence against Ismajli. Ismajli subsequently filed for divorce and took primary custody of their daughter. Fero is currently engaged to an Irish woman named Nita Bajrami, who studied law in Ireland.

== Discography ==
=== Albums ===
- Self Loyalty (2020)

=== Singles ===
==== As lead artist ====
| Title | Year | Peak chart positions | Album |
| Title | Year | ALB | Album |
|---|---|---|---|
| "Feromeni" | 2016 | — | Non-album single |
| "Rra rra" | 2017 | 1 | Non-album single |
| "Harroj" (featuring Kida) | 2017 | — | Non-album single |
| "A pe din qysh" | 2017 | 15 | Non-album single |
| "Bakshish" | 2017 | — | Non-album single |
| "Gang Gang" | 2018 | — | Non-album single |
| "Veni 1" | 2018 | — | Non-album single |
| "Vi vet" | 2018 | — | Non-album single |
| "Bona fam" | 2018 | — | Non-album single |
| "Alles Baba" | 2018 | — | Non-album single |
| "Baba për ikona" | 2019 | — | Non-album single |
| "Fol edhe 1 her" | 2019 | 74 | Non-album single |
| "Ride or Die" | 2019 | — | Non-album single |
| "Jom rrit" | 2019 | 86 | Self Loyalty |
| "Mama" | 2019 | — | Self Loyalty |
| "Habibi" | 2019 | 75 | Self Loyalty |
| "Marijuana" | 2020 | — | Self Loyalty |
"—" denotes a recording that did not chart or was not released in that territory.

==== As featured artist ====
| Title | Year | Peak chart positions | Album |
| Title | Year | ALB | Album |
|---|---|---|---|
| "S'du me ni" (Endri featuring Fero) | 2016 | — | Non-album single |
| "No Kiss" (Baby G featuring Fero) | 2017 | — | Non-album single |
| "Ska konkurenc" (Rina featuring Fero) | 2018 | 2 | Non-album single |
| "Mamacita" (Sparksi featuring Fero) | 2018 | — | Non-album single |
| "Momo" (Zzap featuring Fero) | 2019 | — | Non-album single |
"—" denotes a recording that did not chart or was not released in that territory.
