= Farzad Fattahi =

Iranian songwriter (born 1980)

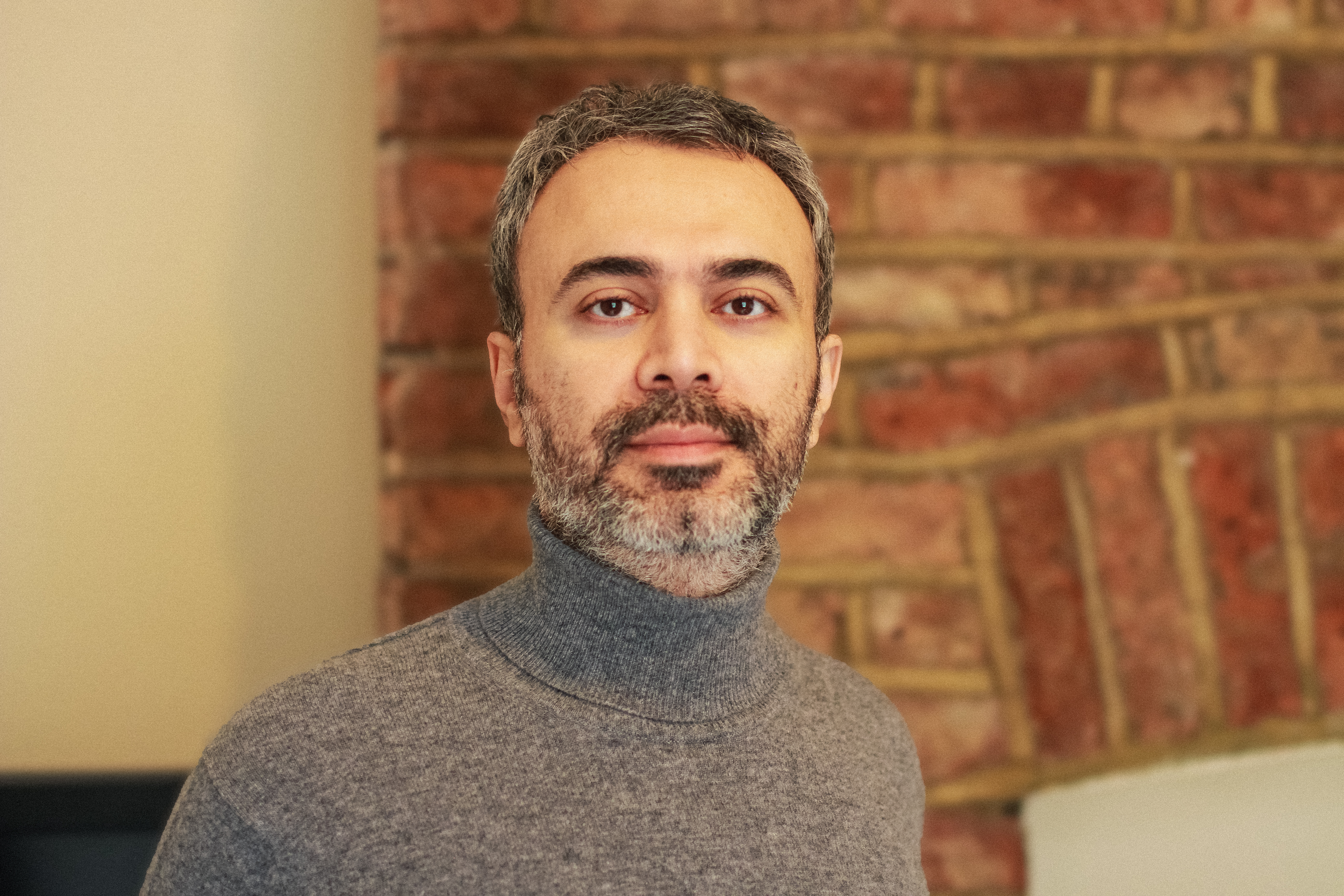

Background information
- Born: Farzad Fattahi; 22 December 1980 (age 45); Tehran, Iran
- Genres: Persian pop, Classical
- Occupations: Singer, Songwriter, TV Producer, Radio Presenter
- Instruments: Keyboard, Bass, Guitar, Flute
- Years active: 1994–present
- Website: https://farzadfattahi.net/

Farzad Fattahi (Persian:فرزاد فتاحی born 22 December 1980) is an Iranian songwriter, documentary maker and TV Producer. Throughout his career, he collaborated with many musicians. He began his activity with Radio Tehran at age 16 with the title of "Tehran at the Night (Persian: تهران در شب)" by Hamid Ameli.

== Education ==
- Diploma of Experimental Sciences
- Bachelor of Italian Language
- Graduated of Computer Graphic Animation
- BFA in Albertina Academy of Fine Arts of Turin, Italy

== Art activities ==
He collaborated with singers such as Dariush Eghbali, Faramarz Aslani, Hassan Shamaizadeh, Mehdi Yarrahi, Farzad Farzin, Mohsen Yeganeh, Mani Rahnama, Nima Masiha, Ali Lohrasbi, Behnam Safavi, Khashayar Etemadi, Mehdi Yaghmaei and Ali Ashabi.

== Other activities ==
Sound Designer, Video Editor, VFX Artist, Tutor of Music and Video Software, at Tehran Institute of Technology.

== Television Works ==
He began his activities in IRIB TV in 2004. The "Yesterday, Today, Tomorrow (Persian: دیروز، امروز، فردا)" and "Backpacks (Persian: کوله‌پشتی)" programs have been released with the voice of Farzad Fattahi.

Farzad Fatahi started working at Radio Free Europe (Radio Farda) in October 2017 as a voice actor in the radio program "Tomorrow Station" along with Farshid Manafi. He then joined Iran International TV.

== Collaboration with poets ==
Ardalan Sarfaraz, Ali Moallem, Afshin Yadollahi, Roozbeh Bamani, Masoud Azar, Babak Saahari, Taraneh Makrom.

== Visual Effects ==
Farzad Fattahi has been featured in the Long Way TV series (Persian: راه طولانی) directed by Reza Karimi (from episode 8 to the end), as well as in the television series Awakening (Persian: بیدار باش), directed by Ahmad Kavari (in all episodes) as the VFX Artist.

== Arrest of Farzad Fattahi ==
In January 2013, Farzad Fattahi was arrested with four other musicians, five reportedly charged with illegal production and distribution of underground music for Los Angeles satellite channels.

== Immigration ==
Farzad Fattahi immigrated from Iran to Italy in August 2016 and then moved to Prague in the Czech Republic. He now lives in London.
