= Ken Fero =

British documentary filmmaker (born 1961)

- Occupation: Documentary filmmaker
- Employer: Coventry University; Regent's University London (2011–)
- Website: pureportal.coventry.ac.uk/en/persons/ken-fero(f834db42-3838-4bad-a2bf-29e798fdf6ad).html

Ken Fero (born 1961) is a UK documentary filmmaker, political activist and co-founder of production company Migrant Media.

== Career ==
Fero, born in Malta, is a filmmaker, activist and educator. His career began in the Fine Arts where he produced experimental art films including Porte Di Roma (1985) for the Arts Council. He was a founding member of production company Migrant Media, with which he produced a number of documentaries for BBC Television and Channel 4 examining issues of racism and resistance, including Germany – The Other Story (1991), winner of a Platform Europe Award, and Sweet France (1992), which won a Mentione Speciale at the Images du Monde Arabe, Paris, and the Milano Province Prize 5th Festival of African Cinema. The BBC and Channel 4 refused to screen his film Injustice. They gave no proper explanation as to why; however, they intimated that the film would never be screened.

He has campaigned on issues of policing and human rights abuses in Europe and the resistance to them and he directed and produced the radical and controversial cinema documentary Injustice (2001), which has won many awards, including Best Documentary - BFM London Film Festival 2002 and Best Documentary (Human Rights) - One World Film Festival 2003. Critically acclaimed, the film gained widespread press coverage across national and international channels including CNN. Injustice has been screened at more than 70 film festivals around the world, winning several awards, and Fero has travelled with the film across Europe, the US and the Middle East. A major screening of the film took place at the European Parliament, where Fero spoke. The impact of the film led to the reform of investigative and legal processes relating to custodial deaths. Much of his production work continues to be screened on a regular basis and maintains a good public profile, including recent articles in The Guardian.

Fero has directed a number of documentary films on social injustice and ethnic minority issues, including commissions for the BBC, Channel 4 and Sky TV. He is also Senior Lecturer of Media Production at Coventry University's Department of Media, as well as Lecturer at RSDFM (Regent's School of Drama, Film and Media) at Regent's University London, and Visiting Lecturer on the MA in Documentary Practice at Brunel University and a visiting research Fellow at Goldsmiths College in the Centre for Cultural Studies. He also delivers lectures internationally.

His background in Fine Art and time-based work has recently led to research interest in the practice of a "documentary of force" by engaging in experimental reimaging practices and an essayistic approach that are clearly non-realistic, manipulative and anti-narrative. He recently produced a short exploring this approach Land Memory People (5 mins/2013), which had its premiere at the Lanchester Art Gallery.

Fero was founding member of Migrant Media, an independent media collective that undertook production, training and exhibition schemes supported by the London Arts Board, UNESCO, Hackney Education Authority, Commission of the European Communities, British Film Institute, Trust for London, London Film Video and Development Agency and the Arts Council. He organised conferences and film festivals at the National Film Theatre and continues to present work at conferences, most recently at "Marx at The Movies" at Lancaster University. He recently established the Documentary Film Production Workshops that assist local people to produce short documentaries.

== Filmography ==
- Germany: The Other Story (1991/30 minutes) - Director
- Britain's Black Legacy (1991/45 minutes) - Director
- After the Storm (1992/25 minutes) - Director/Producer
- Sweet France (1992/50 minutes) - Director
- Tasting Freedom (1994/50 minutes) - Director/Producer
- Justice Denied/Justice for Joy (1995/50 minutes) - Director/Producer
- Injustice (2001/98 minutes) - Director/Producer
- Defeat of the Champion (2011/25 minutes) - Director
- Newspeak (2011/25 minutes) - Director
- Who Polices the Police? (2012/52 minutes) - Director/Producer
- Po Po (2013/25 minutes) - Director/Producer

== Reviews and interviews ==
- Peter Bradshaw, "The Stephen Lawrence case and another Injustice", The Guardian, 5 January 2012
- "Filming Injustice - An interview with Ken Fero", The Multicultural Politic
- Simon Hattenstone, "Deaths in Police Custody", The Guardian, 30 March 2001
- "State Violence Exposed", Socialist Review
- Cindi John, "Injustice aims to rock the system", BBC News, 12 September 2001
- "My Tears Will Catch Them", Sight and Sound, October 2001
