= Farzad Dibachi =

American business executive

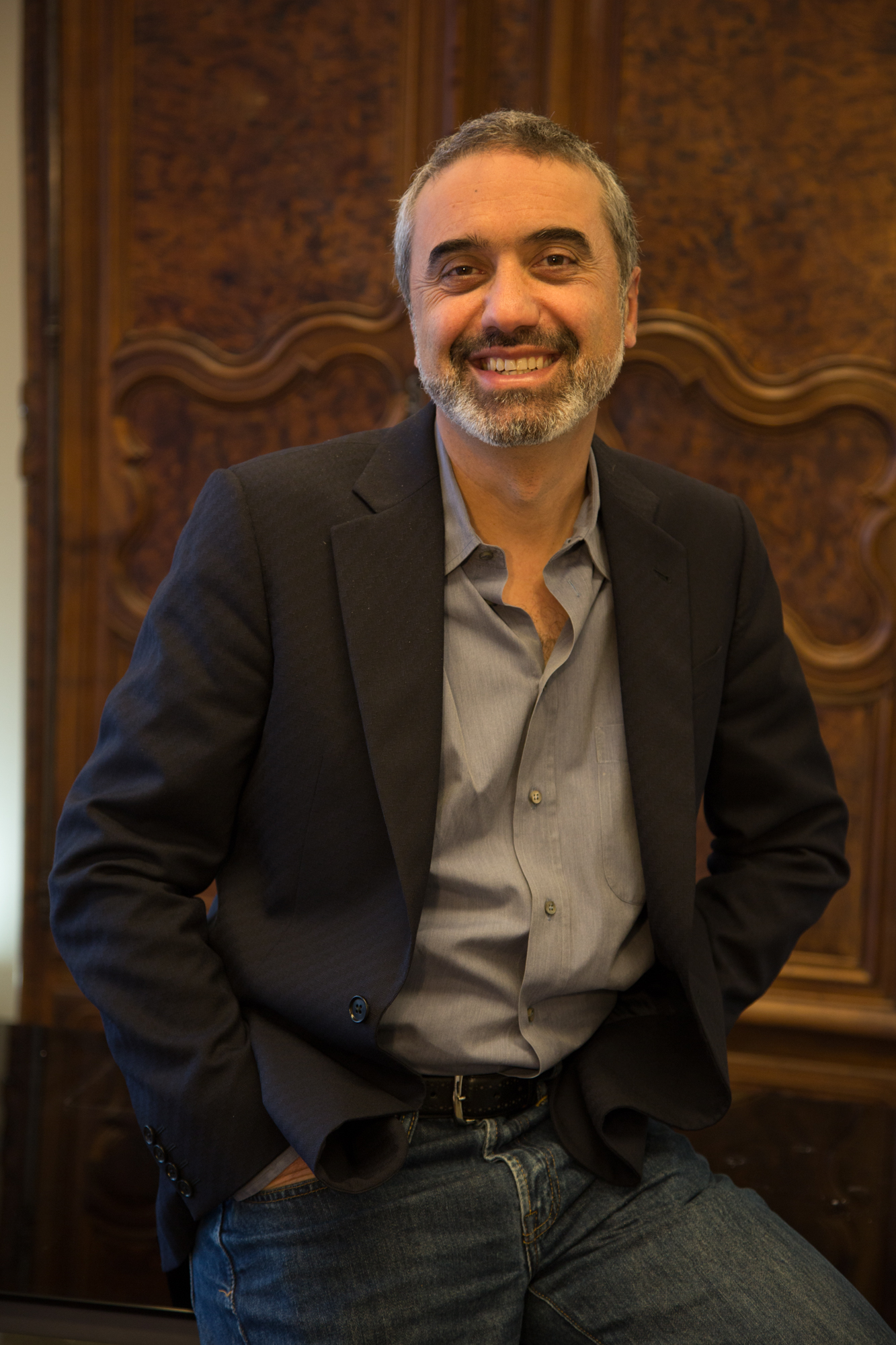
- Born: Iran
- Education: San Jose State University
- Occupations: Entrepreneur, business executive
- Spouse: Rhonda Dibachi (1988-present)

Farzad Dibachi is an entrepreneur, business executive and author. He has co-founded several technology companies, including Diba, which was acquired by Sun Microsystems in 1997, and Niku Corporation, which was acquired by Computer Associates in 2005. He later co-founded Noribachi, a manufacturer of LED lighting products for commercial and industrial applications, and Inxeption, a business-to-business digital commerce company. He is also the co-author of the book Just Add Management: Seven Steps to Creating a Productive Workplace and Motivating Your Employees In Challenging Times. He authored "Diary of a Startup" for Upside (magazine) from 1996 to 1997.

== Early life and education ==
Dibachi was born and raised in Iran until his family immigrated to the United States in 1979 after the Islamic revolution. Later, Dibachi attended San Jose State University in California, where he graduated with degrees in mechanical engineering and computer science at the age of 19. He would later pursue a master's degree in computer science at the University of Santa Clara, finishing all coursework except a final seminar class.

== Career ==
Dibachi started his career at General Electric on an H1-B Visa, moving on to the Tandem Computers software engineering team in 1987 before joining Oracle Corporation in 1990 as a software engineer. Dibachi quickly rose through the ranks at Oracle, ascending to manager, vice president and senior vice president in three years. As the senior vice president of the company's New Media Division, he worked closely with Larry Ellison developing the company's business strategy for a network computer.

Dibachi left Oracle in 1995 to establish Diba, a microelectronics company and early designer of "information appliances" for the Web that he co-founded with his brother, Farid. The company, founded in January 1996, licensed its software and provided hardware designs to companies to manufacture devices.

Dibachi filed paperwork to take Diba public in October 1996, which would have set a record for the fastest tech IPO, but the market went through a small crash. Microsoft reached out for an acquisition 15 months after Dibachi started the company, but Dibachi rejected the offer. He served as the company's president and chief executive until it was sold in 1997 to Sun Microsystems for $75 million. Diba became the foundation for Sun's Consumer Technologies Group, which worked with consumer electronics companies to provide internet-ready, Java-enabled TVs, set-top boxes, satellite boxes and smartphones.

In 1998, Dibachi and his wife, Rhonda, co-founded Niku Corporation a software company headquarters in Redwood City, California. The company's initial financing included a $100,000 investment from Sand Hill Group, following discussions between Dibachi and the firm's investor M. R. Rangaswami. The technology company, an early player in Professional Service Applications (PSA), specialized in software for consulting companies, law firms and advertising agencies and was one of the first companies to provide its software as open source. In the first two years, it grew to 1,100 employees. Niku's web division Iniku, an early cloud-based computing platform, built a marketplace for services to let contractors and large clients come together to negotiate proposals and run projects through the site. The Dibachis took the company public in 2000 on NASDAQ with Goldman Sachs as the lead underwriter. Niku's value tripled on its first day (leap day), with its initial price rising 183 percent for a $7 billion valuation. That same year, it was included on Forbes Magazine's annual Forbes 500 List. Computer Associates, now known as CA, Inc., bought Niku in 2005 for $350 million.

After making Niku cash-flow positive and profitable, Dibachi temporarily retired in 2002 to devote his time to woodworking. He left Silicon Valley in October 2006 for Santa Fe, New Mexico, where he lived for almost 12 years. Of that time, Dibachi said: "I worked in Silicon Valley for a long time, and to be honest, I thought I was done with it — with starting companies, with the 24/7 pace, with the weird distance between 'virtual' products like software and real life, with venture capitalists — my list is long. Not long ago, I felt burned out and fed up. I was so fed up I moved to New Mexico and was pretty sure I wanted to live off the grid and build furniture for the rest of my life."

In 2006, Dibachi and his wife founded Noribachi, a manufacturer of LED lighting products for commercial and industrial applications, in Albuquerque, New Mexico. The company initially experimented with clean-technology products, including solar energy, before focusing on LED lighting. The company achieved 65% gross margins and was seeing $35 million in revenue in 2014. In 2015, Noribachi ranked 224 on the Inc. 5000 list. Dibachi relocated its headquarters and manufacturing operations to Los Angeles in January 2012. In 2015, Noribachi ranked 224th on the Inc. 5000 list, reporting revenue of $22.9 million for the previous year. Dibachi was recognized as Entrepreneur's 2016 "Innovation" leader for his work with Noribachi technology on the Entrepreneur 360 List.

In 2017, Dibachi co-founded Inxeption with Mark Moore and Terry Garnett, all of whom had previously worked together at Oracle. The company was incorporated in October of that year as an online marketplace for business-to-business commerce, seeking to bring e-commerce capabilities to industrial businesses. Inxeption was based in Silicon Valley, with an operational headquarters in Louisville, Kentucky, and offices in Chicago and Atlanta.

Speaking of his startup, Inxeption, Dibachi has said: "The story of where Inxeption came from is as much about me leaving software development and coming back, and reconnecting with the 'real world' outside Silicon Valley as it is about a software start-up. But it's also about the potential to create a new kind of technology-enabled craft manufacturing ethic that provides more satisfaction for both the maker and the customer. We didn't start with new software tools and look for something to do with them; we started with a product, an object people buy and use, and we invented software to help us build and sell it in a better way that creates satisfied customers."

In January 2019, Inxeption announced an equity investment from UPS Strategic Enterprise Fund (NYSE:UPS) to develop e-commerce services for business-to-business (B2B) sellers and buyers. In May 2021, the company received a $61.5 million Series D investment from Coatue Management. In January 2022, Inxeption raised $275 million in a Series E funding round led by Schonfeld Strategic Advisors, valuing the company at approximately $3 billion. In January 2023, Inxeption reported that its revenue run rate had exceeded $300 million in 2022, representing growth of more than 200% over the previous year.

Inxeption shut down in 2024 after several changes in its business strategy.

=== New Naqqali ===
In 2026, Dibachi and his wife, Rhonda, co-founded New Naqqali, a publishing company focused on Persian literature and digital approaches to presenting literary works. The company publishes its English verse translation of Ferdowsi's Shahnameh and is working on an English translation of Sadegh Hedayat's The Blind Owl.

The translation of the Shahnameh comprises 51,547 English couplets across 951 sections. Their approach involved translating the Persian text into English prose before rendering it into rhymed verse using heroic couplets. The translation process also incorporated computational tools and large language models (LLM) to assist with research, rhyme, meter and consistency, while the translators retained responsibility for the final text. In addition to publishing the translations, it involved the development of the General Narrative Markup Language (GNML), a system for structuring narrative texts.

== Selected publications ==
=== Books ===
- Dibachi, Farzad; Dibachi, Rhonda Love (2002). Just Add Management: Seven Steps to Creating a Productive Workplace and Motivating Your Employees in Challenging Times. McGraw-Hill. ISBN 978-0-07-140800-4.
- Dibachi, Farzad; Dibachi, Rhonda (2026). The Shahnameh of Ferdowsi: Volume One. New Naqqali. ASIN B0HPQ49N4Y. ISBN 979-8982339102.
- Dibachi, Farzad; Dibachi, Rhonda (2026). The Shahnameh of Ferdowsi: Volume Two. New Naqqali. ASIN B0HQ13434W. ISBN 979-8982339119.
- Dibachi, Farzad; Dibachi, Rhonda (2026). The Shahnameh of Ferdowsi: Volume Three. New Naqqali. ASIN B0HQ16Z2F8. ISBN 979-8982339126.
- Dibachi, Farzad; Dibachi, Rhonda (2026). The Shahnameh of Ferdowsi: An Abridged Edition. New Naqqali. ASIN B0HPM2LXSJ. ISBN 979-8982339133.

=== Other works ===
- New Naqqali Manga – a manga series adapting stories from the Shahnameh, using couplets from the English translation by Farzad and Rhonda Dibachi. Published by New Naqqali.
- Women of the Shahnameh – a manga series featuring first-person retellings of female characters from the Shahnameh, written by Farzad and Rhonda Dibachi and published by New Naqqali.

== Personal life ==
Dibachi met his wife Rhonda while working at General Electric. They married in 1988 and have one son together. Dibachi and his wife are also founding donors of Pacific Community Ventures, a non-profit community-development organization.
