= Scannabecchi =

Scannabecchi (Italian pronunciation: [skannaˈbekki]) is an Italian surname from Emilia, literally translating to 'buck-killer'. Notable people with this surname include:

- Angiola Teresa Moratori Scanabecchi or Scannabecchi (1662–1708), Italian composer and painter
- Filippo Scannabecchi (1352–1410), known as Lippo di Dalmasio, Italian painter
- Lamberto Scannabecchi (1060–1130), head of the Catholic Church and ruler of the Papal States as Pope Honorius II
