= Antonio Gerola =

Italian painter

Antonio Giarola or Gerola, known as Cavalier Coppa was an Italian painter of the Baroque period.

He was a pupil of Francesco Albani and Guido Reni in Bologna. He was active in Mantua, and then for many years in Verona.
