= Oratory of San Colombano, Bologna =

Religious site in Bologna, Italy

Coordinates: 44.4967°N 11.3408°E

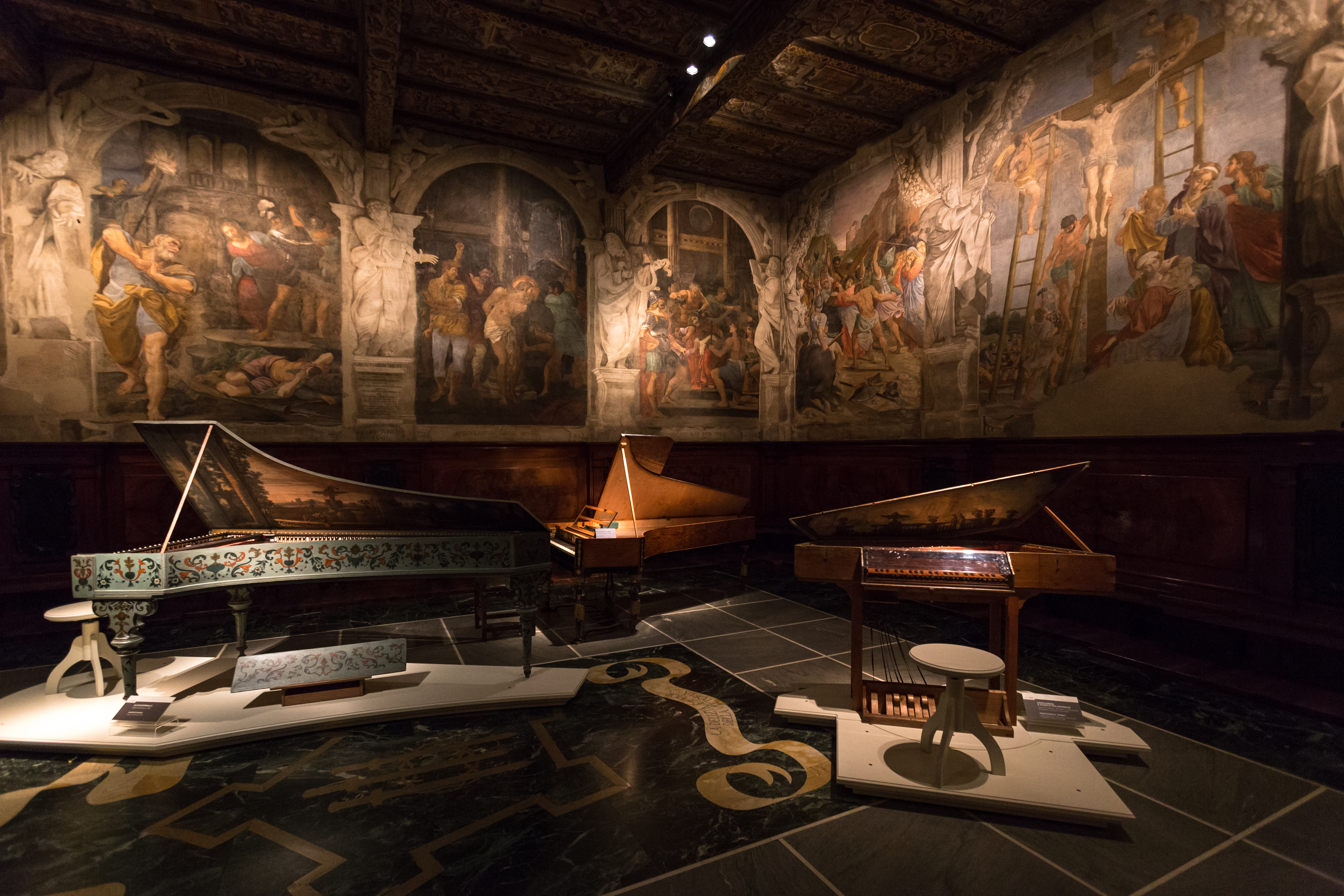
Workshop of Ludovico Carracci

The Oratory of the Madonna of San Colombano, also called the Chiese di San Colombano e Santa Maria dell'Orazione, is a religious site in central Bologna, found on Via Parigi #5, near the Bologna Cathedral.

== History ==
The oratory was built in 1591, atop the site of a chapel or small church that sheltered the painting of the Madonna dell’Orazione by Lippo di Dalmasio. The church, called San Colombano, at the site had been founded in the 7th century by Peter I, the bishop of Bologna and pupil of the Irish monk Columbanus. Columbanus had died in nearby Bobbio.

The annexed oratory contained a revered icon of the Virgin by Lippo Dalmasio as a main altarpiece. Starting about the year 1600, it was decorated by an impressive series of pupils of Ludovico Carracci, among them some of the titans of early Italian Baroque painting: Francesco Albani, Francesco Brizio, Domenichino, Lorenzo Garbieri, Lucio Massari, Guido Reni, and Baldassare Aloisi (il Balanino). The frescoes include scenes from the Passion and Resurrection of Christ.

Among the paintings listed by Malvasia in the Oratory are:

- Last Judgement (outside portico) by Pietro Pancotto
- St Francis with angels above and demons below (right wall) by Antonio Caracci
- Virgin and Child with Joseph gathering dates by Leonello Spada
- Sibyl (above side door) by Garbieri
- Coronation of St Catherine also by Garbieri
- St Marta conversing with the Savior before whom the Magdalen is kneeling (vault) by Massari
- Sibyl (over door) and Angel bearing the palm of martyrdom to St Ursula also by Massari
- Infant Jesus playing with St. John in the presence of little angels by Paolo Caracci

In the upper oratory, the frescoes include a St Peter going out weeping from Pilate’s house by Francesco Albani.

The property now belongs to the Fondazione Cassa di Risparmio in Bologna, and is being restored. Restorations have uncovered earlier 13th-century frescoes.

The attached complex of buildings, since 2010, houses the collection of musical instruments donated by Luigi Ferdinando Tagliavini, consisting of nearly ninety pieces including harpsichords, spinets, pianofortes, clavichords and others. It also houses the musical library of Oscar Mischiati.

== See also ==
- List of music museums
