= Francesco Montanari =

Francesco Montanari may refer to:

- Francesco Montanari (painter) (1750–1786), Italian painter
- Francesco Montanari (actor) (born 1984), Italian actor
