= Palazzo Ghisilardi Fava =

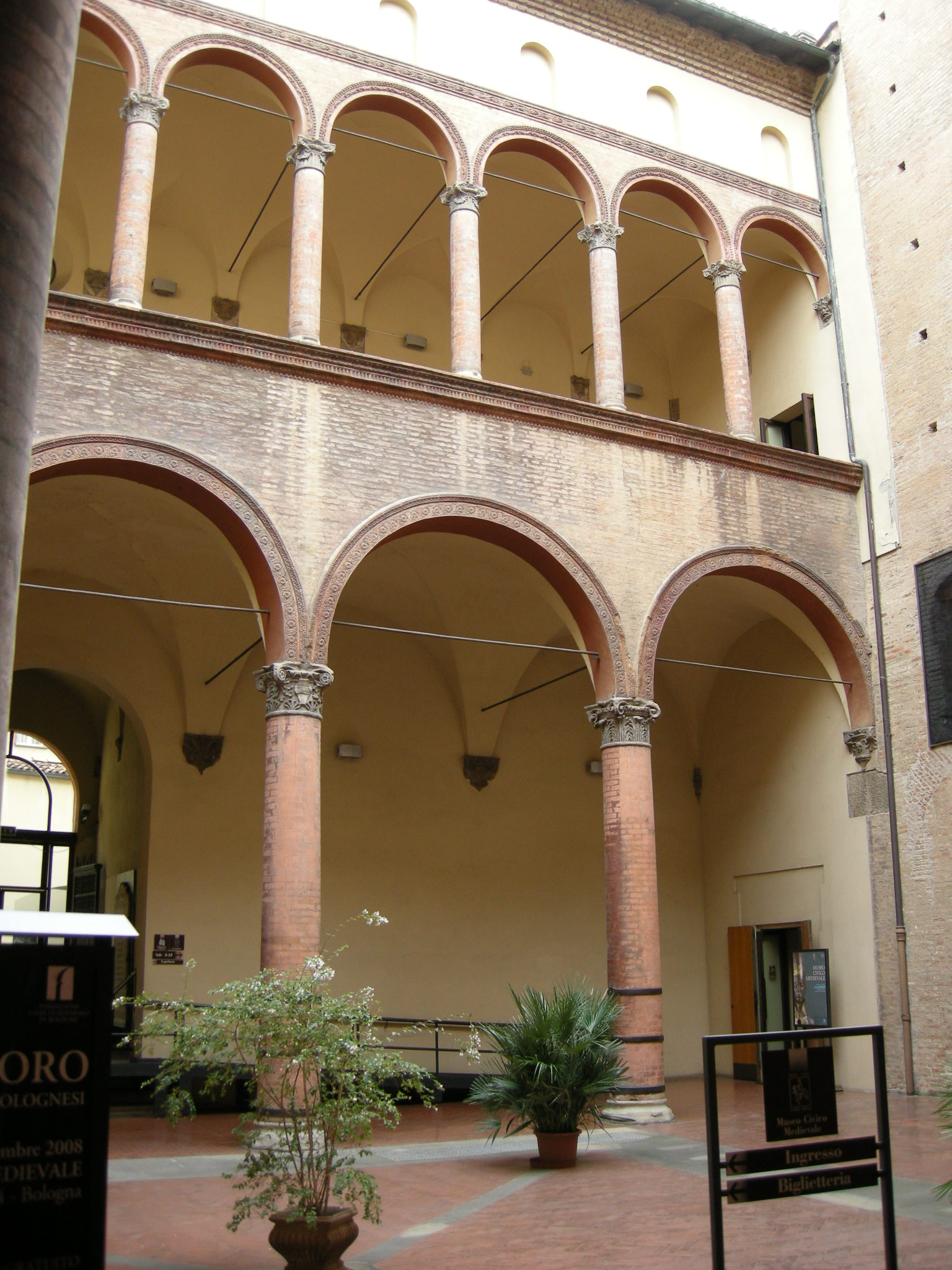
- Inner courtyard
- Interactive map of the Palazzo Ghisilardi Fava area

General information
- Type: Palace
- Architectural style: Renaissance
- Location: Bologna, Italy
- Coordinates: 44°29′47″N 11°20′31″E
- Groundbreaking: 1484
- Completed: 1491

Design and construction
- Architect: Zilio Montanari

Palazzo Ghisilardi Fava is a Renaissance style palace, located on via Manzoni 4 in Bologna, region of Emilia Romagna, Italy; it houses the Medieval Civic Museum of Bologna.

Built for the notary and chancellor Bartolomeo Ghisilardi between 1484 and 1491 on designs of Zilio Montanari. In the courtyard of the palace, rises the medieval tower called Torre dei Conoscenti. The name is derived because the house on the site was owned by the Conoscenti family in the 14th century. The tower was damaged in the earthquake of 1505. During the Mussolini era, the palace housed the Casa del Fascio of Bologna. Across the street stands the church of the Madonna di Galliera.
