= Giacinto Bellini =

Italian painter

Cavaliere Giacinto Bellini (17th century) was an Italian painter active in the Baroque period.

== Life ==
Giacinto Bellini, born at Bologna, in the early part of the 17th century, was a scholar of Francesco Albani. On leaving the school of that master, he was taken under the protection of the Count Odoardo Pepoli, by whom he was sent to Rome with Francesco Carracci, for the advantage of study. He was not long at Rome before he discovered an ability that recommended him to the patronage of Cardinal Tonti, who was so satisfied with bis performances, that he procured him the knighthood of the order of Loretto. He painted in the manner of Albani, and his pictures possess much of the graceful style of that esteemed master. He was living in 1660.
