= Francesco Stringa =

Italian painter (1578–1615)

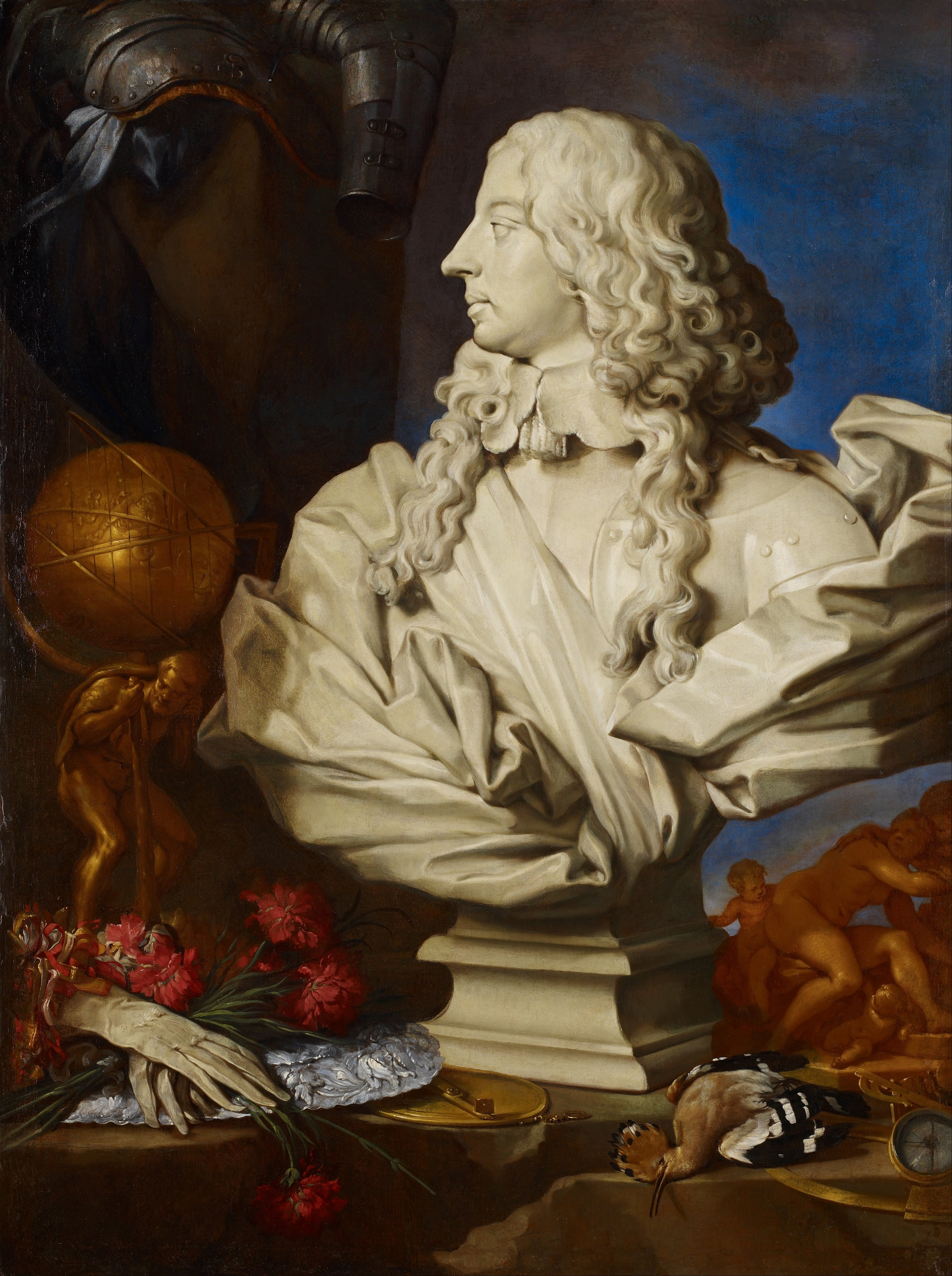
Allegorical Still Life with Bernini's Bust of Francis I d'Este

Francesco Stringa (1635–1709) was an Italian painter of the Baroque era, active mainly near his native city of Modena.

He is said to have been a follower of the style, if not the pupil of Ludovico Lana and Guercino. He served as the superintendent of the Galleria Estense in Modena. Some sources claim he was influenced by the naturalism of Mattia Preti. The Allegorical Still Life with Bernini's Bust of Duke Francesco I d'Este at the Minneapolis Institute of art is attributed to Stringa. Francesco Vellani, Antonio Consetti Girolamo Donnini and Jacopo Zoboli were said to have been his pupils.
