= Francesco Montanari (painter) =

Italian painter

Francesco Montanari (1750 in Lugo, Emilia-Romagna – 1786) was an Italian painter of the Neoclassical period.

He trained in Lugo under Benedetto Dal Buono. From there, he moved to Bologna where he worked for two years in the studio of Ubaldo Gandolfi, he then moved to Ferrara to briefly work with Girolamo Donini, and to Verona to work under Cignaroli. In Verona, he painted a Death of Rachel. He painted a Jacob is brought his son's bloody clothes. Returning to Lugo, he painted for the Franciscans a canvas depicting The Martyrdom of Saints Crispin and Crispiano and the Four Theologic Virtues. Among other works, he painted canvases depicting: The Prodigal Son, St Giovanni Ganzio, A Deposition from the Cross, The Confidence of Alexander, a Guardian Angel, a self-portrait, a portrait of the children of Cignaroli, a portrait of Anton Raphael Mengs, and a portrait of his father.
