= Madonna di Galliera =

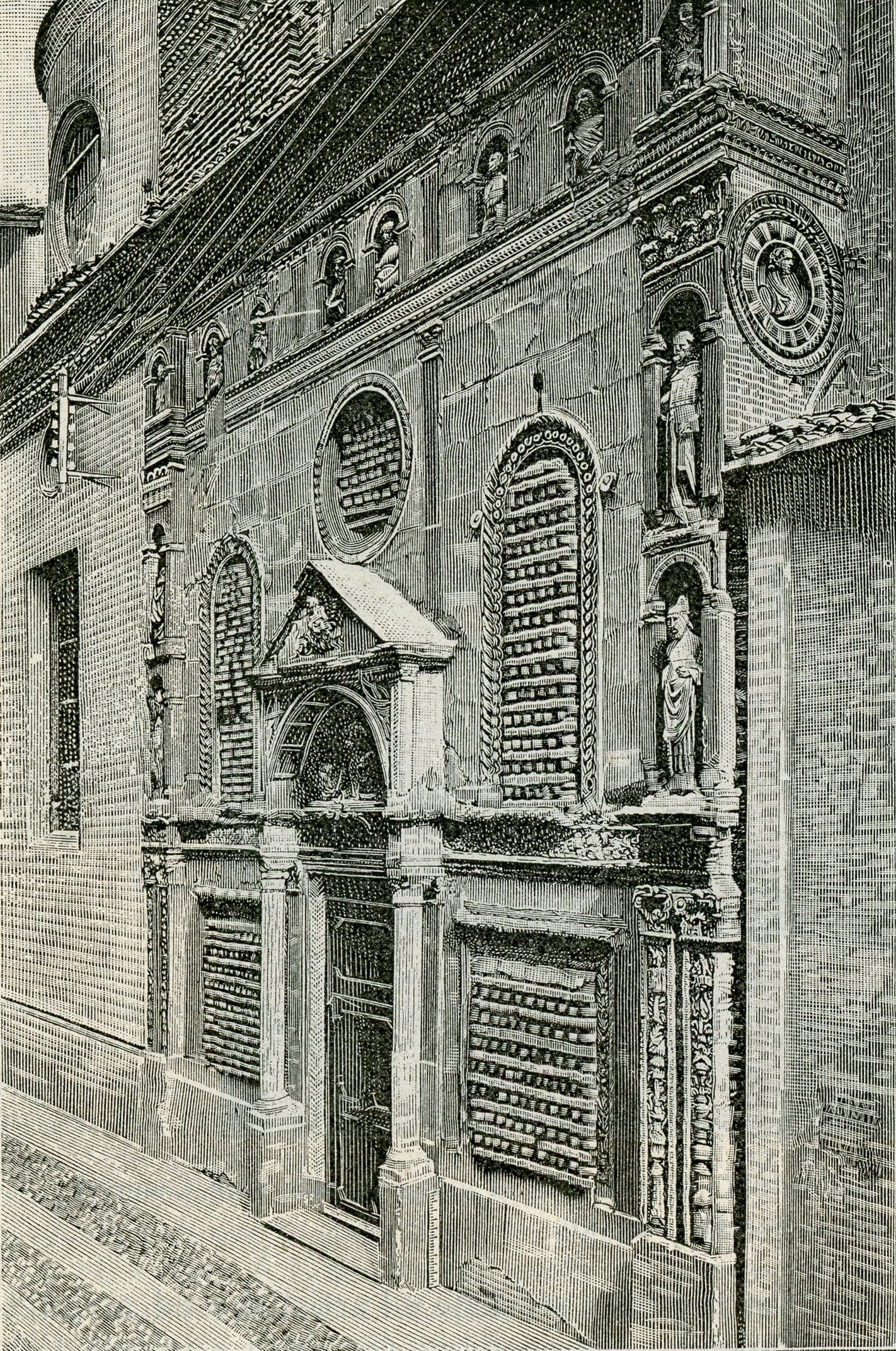

- Location within Emilia-Romagna Location within Italy Location within Europe
- 44°29′48″N 11°20′33″E
- Location: Bologna, Emilia-Romagna
- Country: Italy

History
- Founded: 1304; 722 years ago

The Madonna di Galliera is a church with a Renaissance facade and Baroque interiors, located on Via Manzoni, in central Bologna, Italy. It stands in front of the Palazzo Ghisilardi Fava. The present name over the portal is the Chiesa di Filippini Madonna di Galliera e Filippo Neri.

== History ==
The church was acquired in 1622 by the Oratorians of St Phillip Neri, who reconstructed the interiors, and built the adjacent Oratory of San Filippo Neri.

The original church at the site was founded in 1304 by a charitable order which translates into Confraternity of the Shameful Poor (Compagnia dei Poveri Vergognosi). By 1479 they began construction of the sculpturally rich stone Renaissance facade, with a design attributed to Egidio Montanari, and sculptures by Zilio Montanari.

The interiors were all refurbished by the Oratorians, including reconstruction by Giuseppe Antonio Torri in 1684. The interior includes frescoes by Giuseppe Marchesi in the ceiling, apse and ceiling of the 1st chapel on the left, and altarpieces by Francesco Albani (Holy Family); Guercino (Filippo Neri); Angelo Michele Colonna; Lorenzo Pasinelli; Teresa Muratori; Girolamo Donnini; and Marcantonio Franceschini (Madonna, St Francis of Sales and other Saints). The sacristy has further paintings by Giovan Andrea and Elisabetta Sirani, Cesare Gennari, and Albani. The interior includes sculptures by Giuseppe Mazza (stucco angels on main altar), Angelo Piò, and Silvestro Giannotti. The main altar (circa 1750) was designed by Francesco Galli Bibiena.

The church suffered damage in World War II (see Bombing of Bologna in World War II). In 2014, the church was undergoing restoration.
