= Carlo Mazza =

Italian painter

Carlo Mazza (1704-1777) was an Italian painter.

== Biography ==
He was born in Correggio, but mainly active in Bologna. He trained under Girolamo Donnini. He painted in the chapel of Santissimi Sacramento in San Petronio of Bologna. In the church of the Servi, he painted a Santi Simone e Giuda. He painted a Saints Anne, Charles, and Louis for the church of San Bartolomeo in Porta Ravegnana. He painted a Santo Uomobono for the church of Sant'Eligio. He died in Bologna. He may be related to the sculptor Giuseppe Maria Mazza.
