= Bartolommeo Morelli =

Italian painter

Bartolommeo Morelli, (Bologna, c. 1560-Bologna, 1603) also called il Pianoro, was an Italian painter from the baroque period, active mainly in quadratura and frescoes. He was a pupil of Francesco Albani in Bologna. His main work in Bologna were frescoes in the chapel of the Pepoli Family in San Bartolommeo di Porta. Malvasia refers to him as Bartolommeo Pianoro, who was also active in Genova at the same time as Andrea Sghizzi, another pupil of Albani.
