= Benedetto dal Buono =

Italian painter

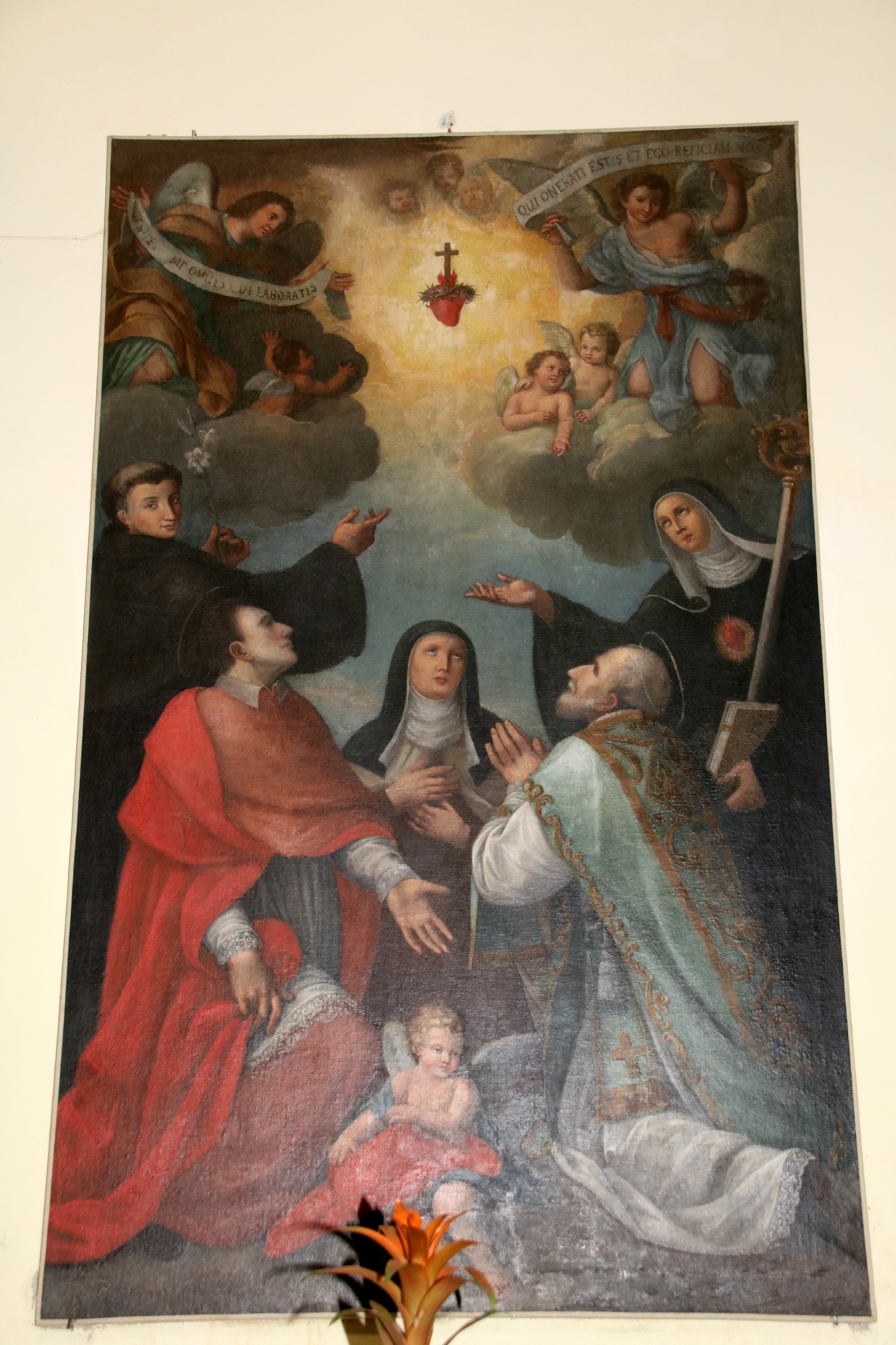
Heart of Jesus among Saints by Benedetto Dal Buono, Chiesa di Santa Maria Maddalena (Fermignano)

Benedetto Dal Buono (7 May 1711 – 1775) was an Italian painter of the Neoclassical period.

He was born in Lugo, Emilia-Romagna, and initially trained with a wood engraver named Paganelli from Forlì. From there, he moved to Bologna where he was associated for 23 years with the Accademia del nudo and the studio of Girolamo Donini. He painted for many houses and churches in Lugo. He was described as eruditely educated about the classic mythology and literature. Among his works were and altarpiece the church of San Francesco of Lugo; another in the Pio Suffragio of the city; another in San Michele of Bagnacavallo; another in the Collegiata Trisiano; and he painted for the gallery of Paolo Borsi.

Among his pupils there were Francesco Montanari, Gaetano Nuvoli, and Benedetto Zabberoni.
