= Nativity of the Virgin (Francesco Albani) =

Painting by Francesco Albani

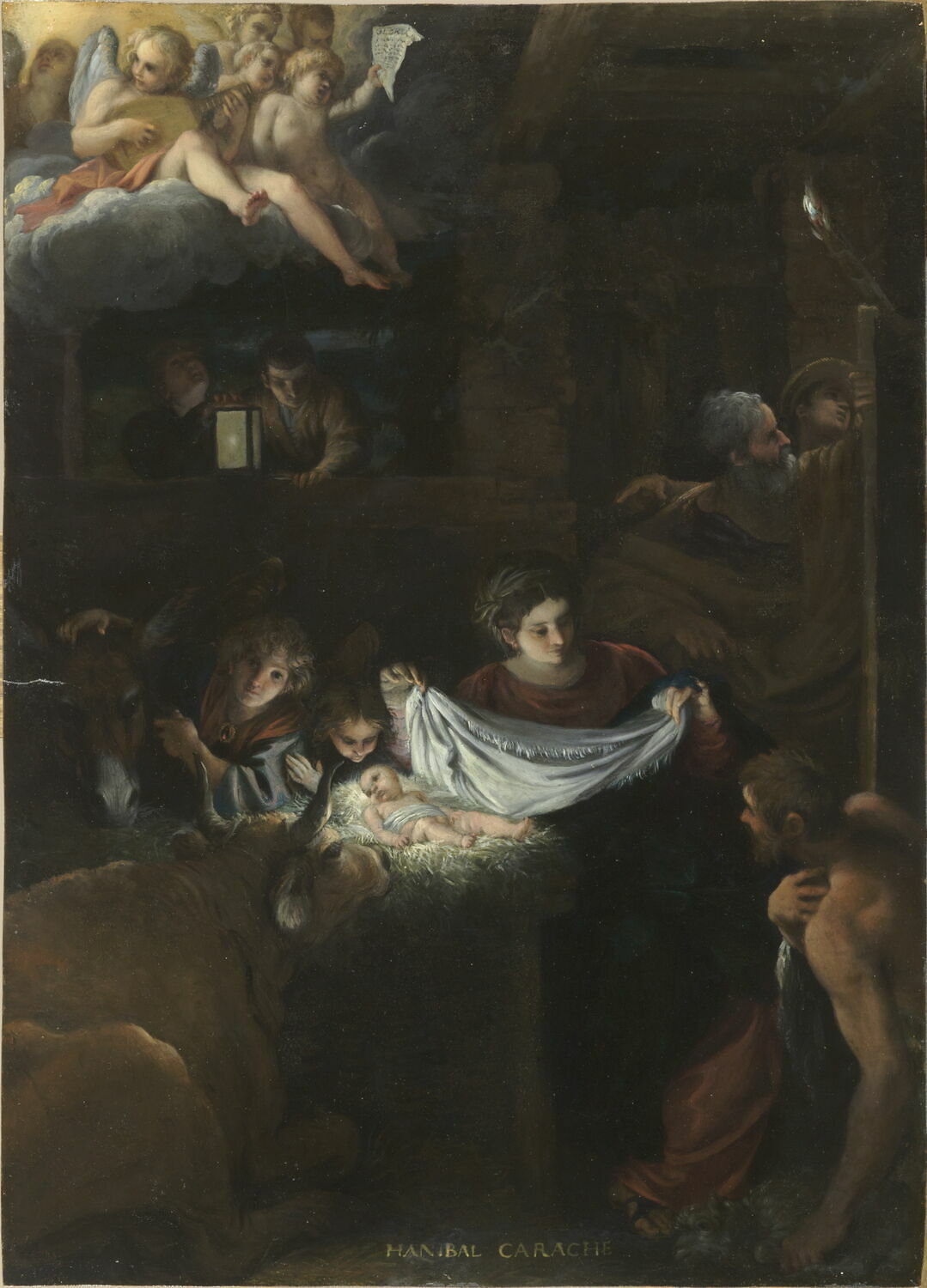
- Artist: Francesco Albani
- Year: circa 1598
- Medium: Oil on canvas
- Dimensions: 327 cm × 175 cm (129 in × 69 in)
- Location: Musei Capitolini, Rome

The Nativity of the Virgin is a painting by the Italian Baroque painter Francesco Albani and housed in the Sala VII di Santa Petronilla in the Capitoline Museum in Rome, Italy.

== Description ==
The altarpiece was transferred from a mural to canvas in the 19th century. The Bolognese art historian Carlo Cesare Malvasia attributes a Nativity of the Virgin to Albani. It was originally painted for the Oratory of Santa Maria del Piombo in Bologna, and is documented there at least until 1598. Albani's contemporary Guido Reni also contributed works for the oratory. In 1797, the work was taken to France, and returned only in 1815, and was placed in this museum in 1818.

The canvas depicts the birth of Mary, mother of Jesus. This event was commonly depicted in scenes of Marian veneration. While the Dogma of the Immaculate Conception would not be explicitly stated until 1854, even from late antiquity, Christian theologians such as Ambrose and Augustine, had invoked the exceptional birth of Mary, wherein she alone among women had been born free of original sin. Hence, while saints on their transit to glory, or posthumously after their entrance to glory, could be accompanied by angels; Mary, uniquely among women, could merit an angelic choir at birth. Mary is typically depicted in a well-to-do household.
