= Oratory of San Filippo Neri, Bologna =

Oratory in Bologna, Italy

Coordinates: 44.496563°N 11.342058°E

The Oratory of San Filippo Neri in Bologna is a restored late-Baroque religious structure in central Bologna. It is located on Via Manzoni. The Oratory was constructed from the sacristy of the adjacent church of the Madonna di Galliera. This church is now called Chiesa dei Filippini Madonna di Galliera e Filippo Neri.

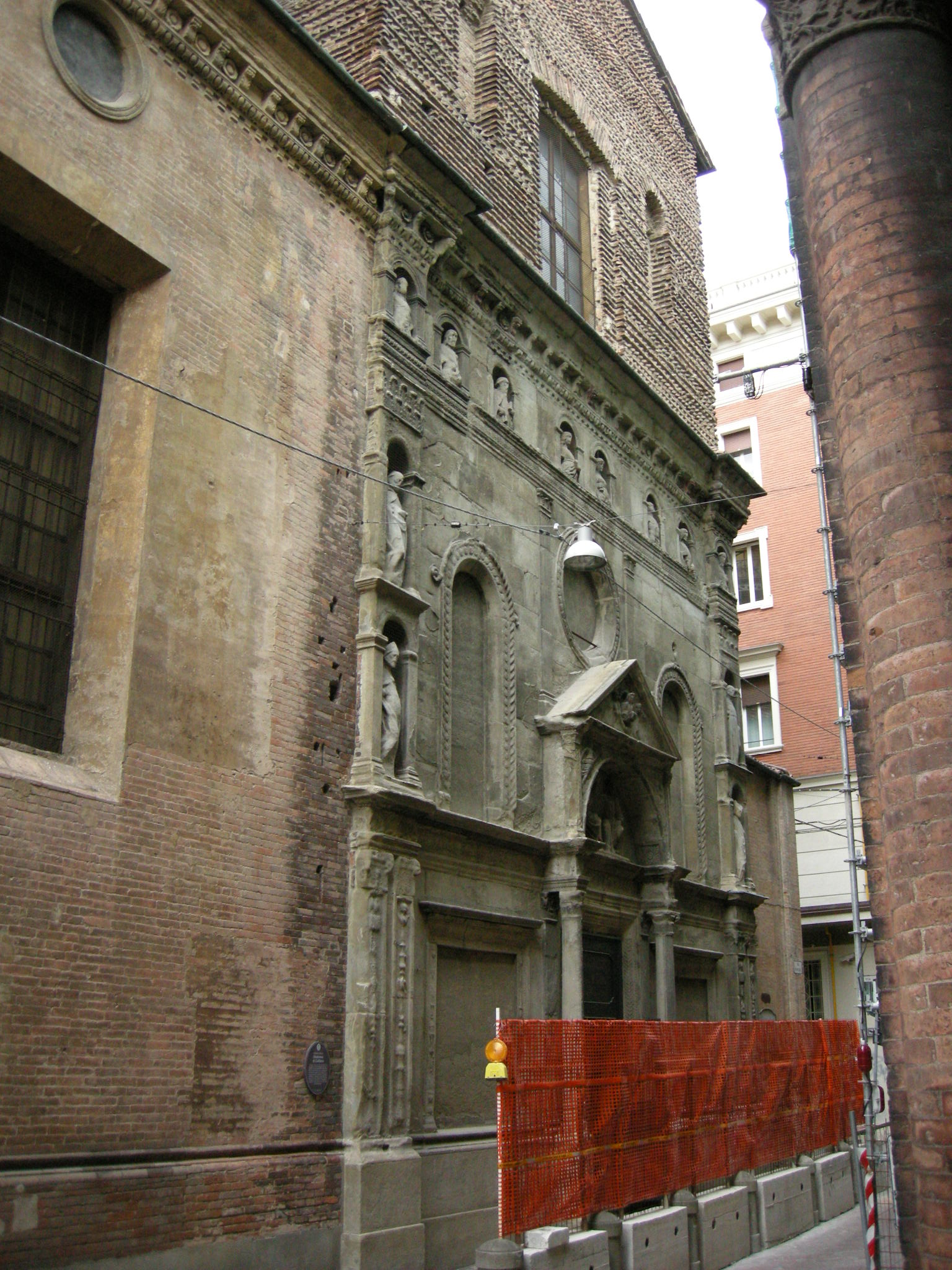
Renaissance facade of the church of the Madonna di Galliera.

== History ==
The original oratory was commissioned by the Oratorian Order of Philip Neri. It was decorated in the early 18th century (1723-1733) by a series of artists including Alfonso Torreggiani (architect); Angelo Piò (sculptor), and Francesco Monti (painter). Other artists involved included the quadraturae painter Fernando Galli Bibiena (1657-1743) and the stuccoist Carlo Nessi. The oratory now contains the altarpiece of Ecce Homo by Ludovico Carracci. A modern organ was installed on the site of the previous one.

The Oratory as a religious organization was suppressed in 1866, and for a time, the oratory was used as a barracks. In the year 1900, it was reconsecrated for services. The original structure was nearly destroyed by the Allied bombardment during World War II, and was reconstructed using old photographs in 1997–1999.

Another similar baroque oratory in Bologna is the Oratorio di San Carlo.
