= Giovanni Francesco Grimaldi =

Italian painter (1606–1680)

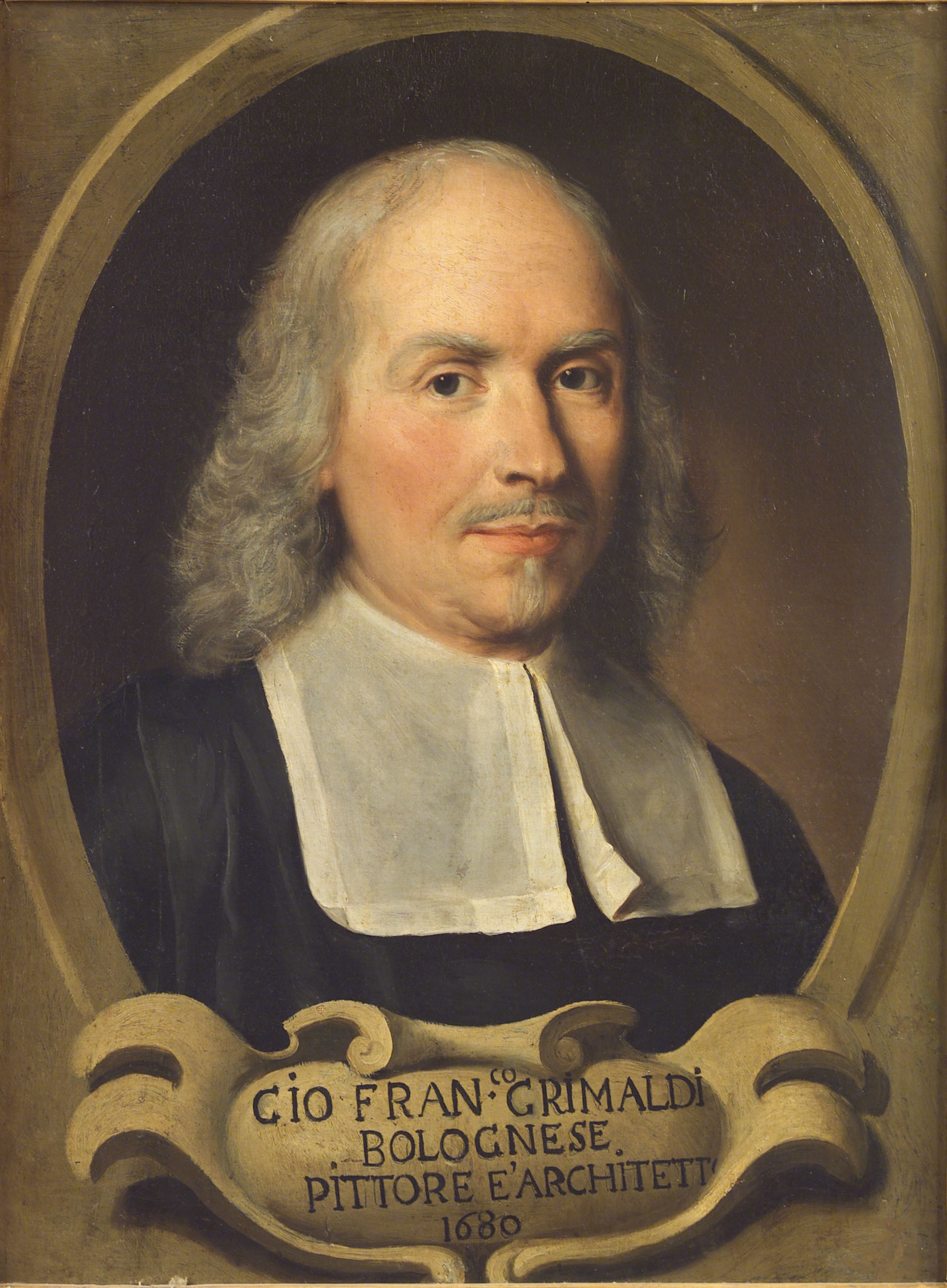
- Born: 1606; Bologna, Papal States
- Died: 28 November 1680 (aged 73–74); Rome, Papal States
- Education: Ludovico Carracci, Francesco Albani
- Known for: Painting
- Children: 1 son

Giovanni Francesco Grimaldi (1606 – 28 November 1680) was an Italian painter, draughtsman, printmaker and architect. He was an accomplished fresco painter of classical landscapes which were popular with leading Roman families.

== Life ==
Grimaldi was born in Bologna, and trained in the circle of the Carracci family. He was afterwards a pupil of Cardinal Francesco Albani. He went to Rome, and was appointed architect to Pope Paul V and also patronized by succeeding popes. Towards 1648 he was invited to France by Cardinal Mazarin, and for about two years was employed in buildings for that minister and for Louis XIV, and in fresco-painting in the Louvre.

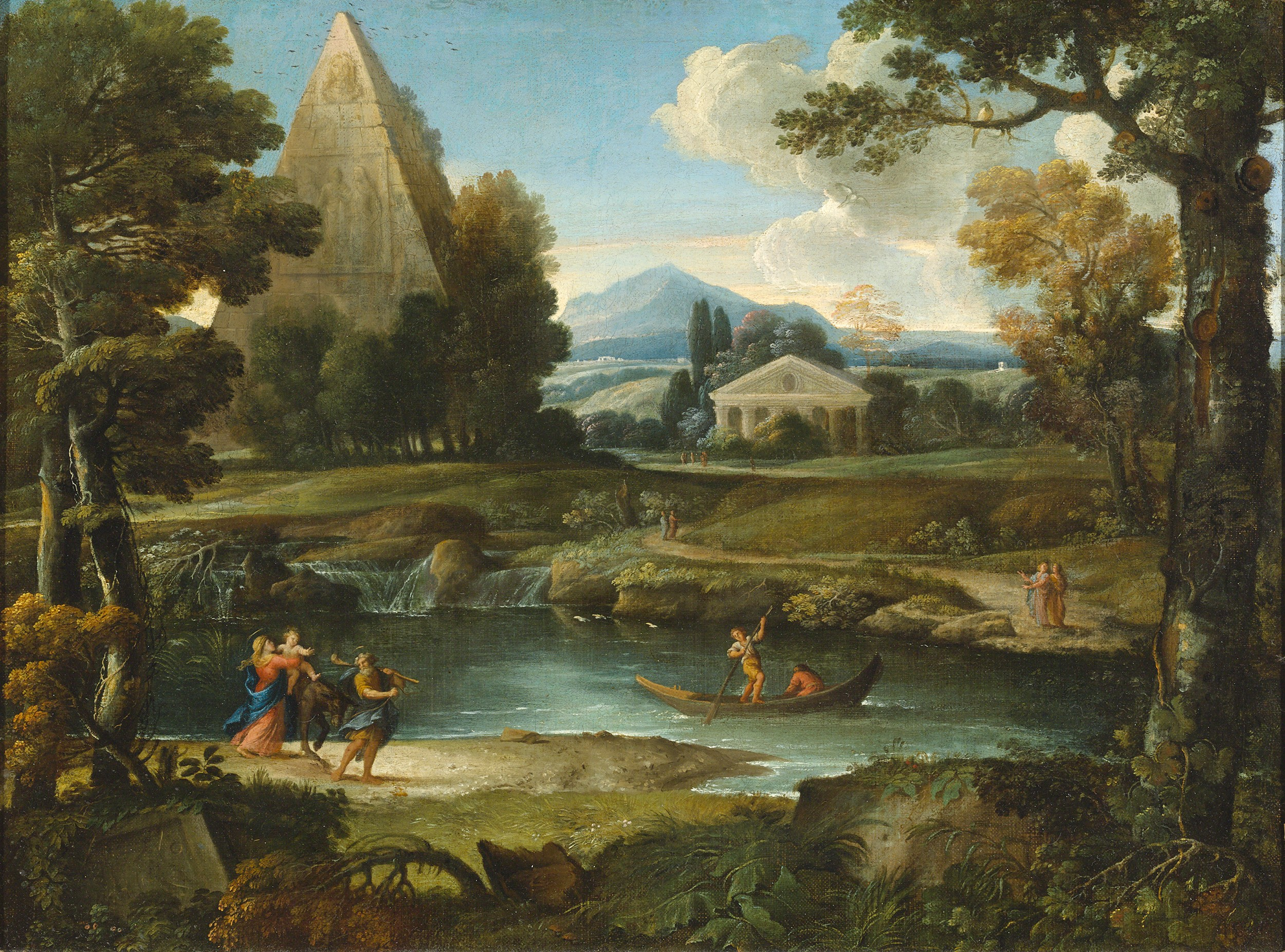
Flight Into Egypt

His colour was strong, somewhat excessive in the use of green; his touch light. He painted history, portraits and landscapes, and executed engravings and etchings from his own landscapes and from those of Titian and the Caracci. Returning to Rome, he was made principe (director) of the Accademia di San Luca; and he died in Rome, having established a reputation for artistic skill and charitable actions.

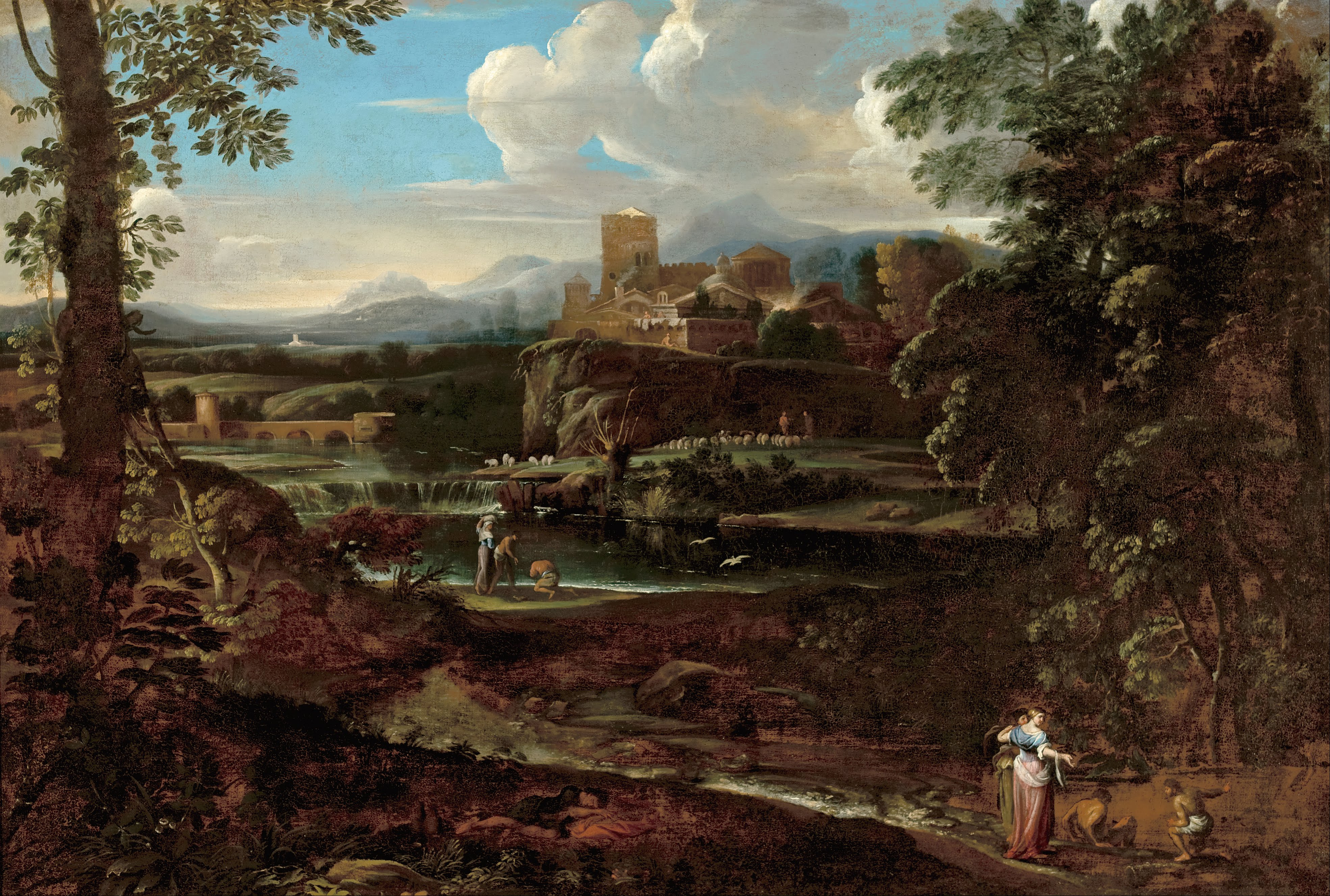
Classical landscape

His son Alessandro assisted him both in painting and in engraving. Paintings by Grimaldi are preserved in the Palazzo del Quirinale and in the Apostolic Palace, and in the church of San Martino ai Monti; there is also a series of his landscapes in the Palazzo Colonna. His mistress was Elena Aloisi, daughter of the painter Baldassare Aloisi.
