= Oratorio di San Carlo, Bologna =

Baroque-style prayer hall in Bologna, Emilia-Romagna, Italy

Coordinates: 44.5010°N 11.3409°E

The Oratorio di San Carlo is a Baroque-style prayer hall located inside the church of San Carlo al Porto located on #5 Via del Porto (Strada Porto Naviglio) in Bologna, region of Emilia-Romagna, Italy.

== History ==
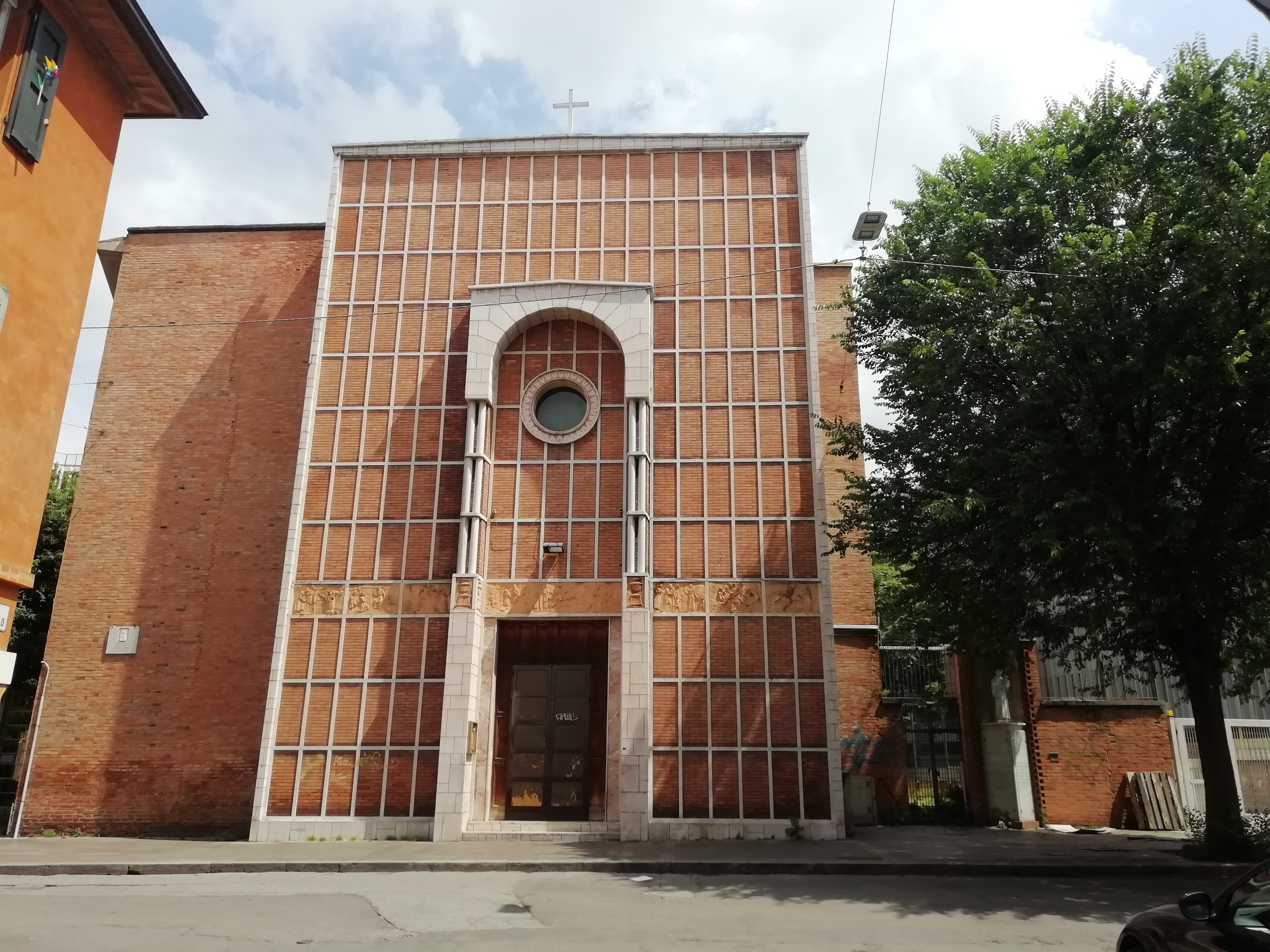
Modern church of San Carlo

In 1466, the confraternity of Santa Maria del Paradiso, was founded around the cult of an image at the site. In 1612 the confraternity changed its name to the Confraternity of San Carlo Borromeo. The Oratory chapel was built in 1667. They engaged the painter Giacomo Friani, a pupil of Agostino Mitelli, to fresco the ceilings. The center fresco depicts the Ecstasy of San Carlo and the Madonna. A series of medallions with the life of San Carlo were completed by Giovanni Battista Bolognini.

After the Napoleonic invasions, the oratory was closed, only to reopen in 1833. In 1896, the property was given to the Salesian order. it underwent restoration in 1906.

The oratory was one of the few buildings left intact in the neighborhood after the Allied bombings of January 29, 1944. It is now used for cultural activities. The church of San Carlo, for example, was leveled and the tall modern brick facade has a sculpted frieze and a portal made from marble.

Another similar baroque oratory in Bologna is the Oratorio di San Filippo Neri.
