= Girolamo Donnini =

Italian painter (1681–1743)

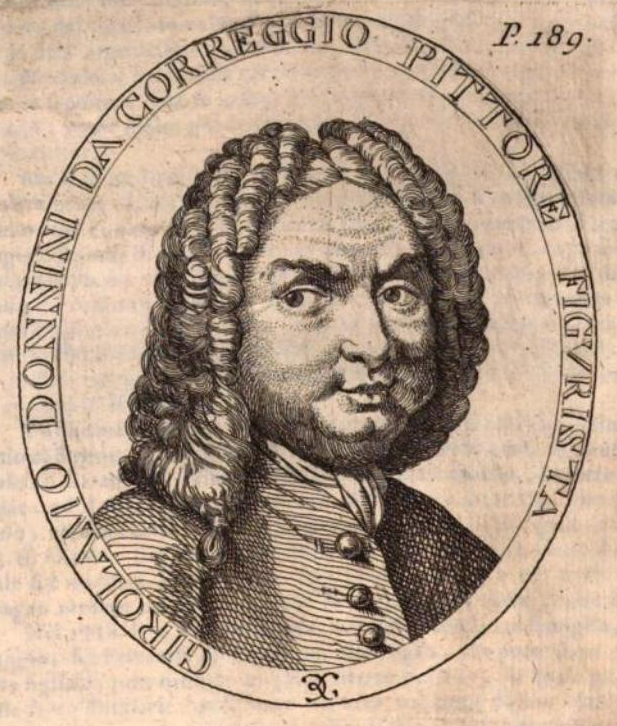
Portrait of Girolamo Donnini by Luigi Crespi (1769)

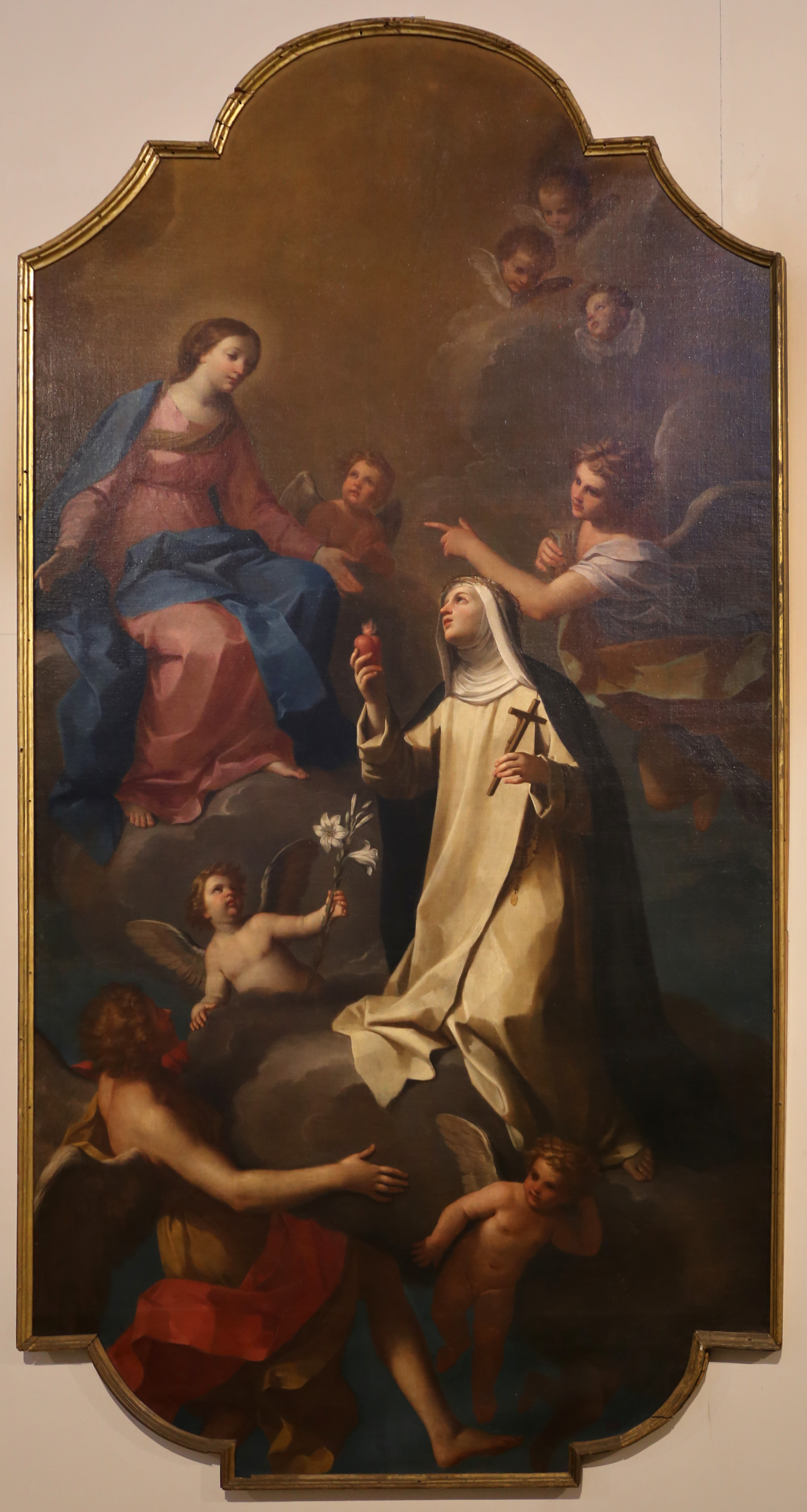
The Virgin and the Blessed Osanna Andreasi, Mantua, palazzo Ducale

Girolamo Donnini (18 April 1681 – 1743) was an Italian painter of the Baroque period, born in the town of Correggio, Emilia-Romagna. He was a pupil of the painters Francesco Stringa in Modena, and then of Giovanni Gioseffo dal Sole in Bologna, then traveled to Forlì to work with Carlo Cignani.

== Biography ==
He painted an Annunciation for the high altar in the church of the Annunziata delle Orfanelle in Turin, a St Joseph instructed by the angel for church of the Church of Corpus Domini in Bologna, and also a painting for the church of the Madonna di Galliera also in Bologna. In Pescia, he painted a Visitation for the church of the Salesians. Another painting on the same topic is found in the church of St. Sebastian in Correggio. He painted a St Anthony of Padua for the church of San Francesco in Rimini. He also painted in the church of the Una dell'Ospedale Maggiore of Bergamo.

His pupils include Francesco Bosi (Gobbo di Sinibaldo), Benedetto dal Buono (1711-1775), and Carlo Mazza.
