= Francesco Albani =

Italian Baroque painter (1578–1660)

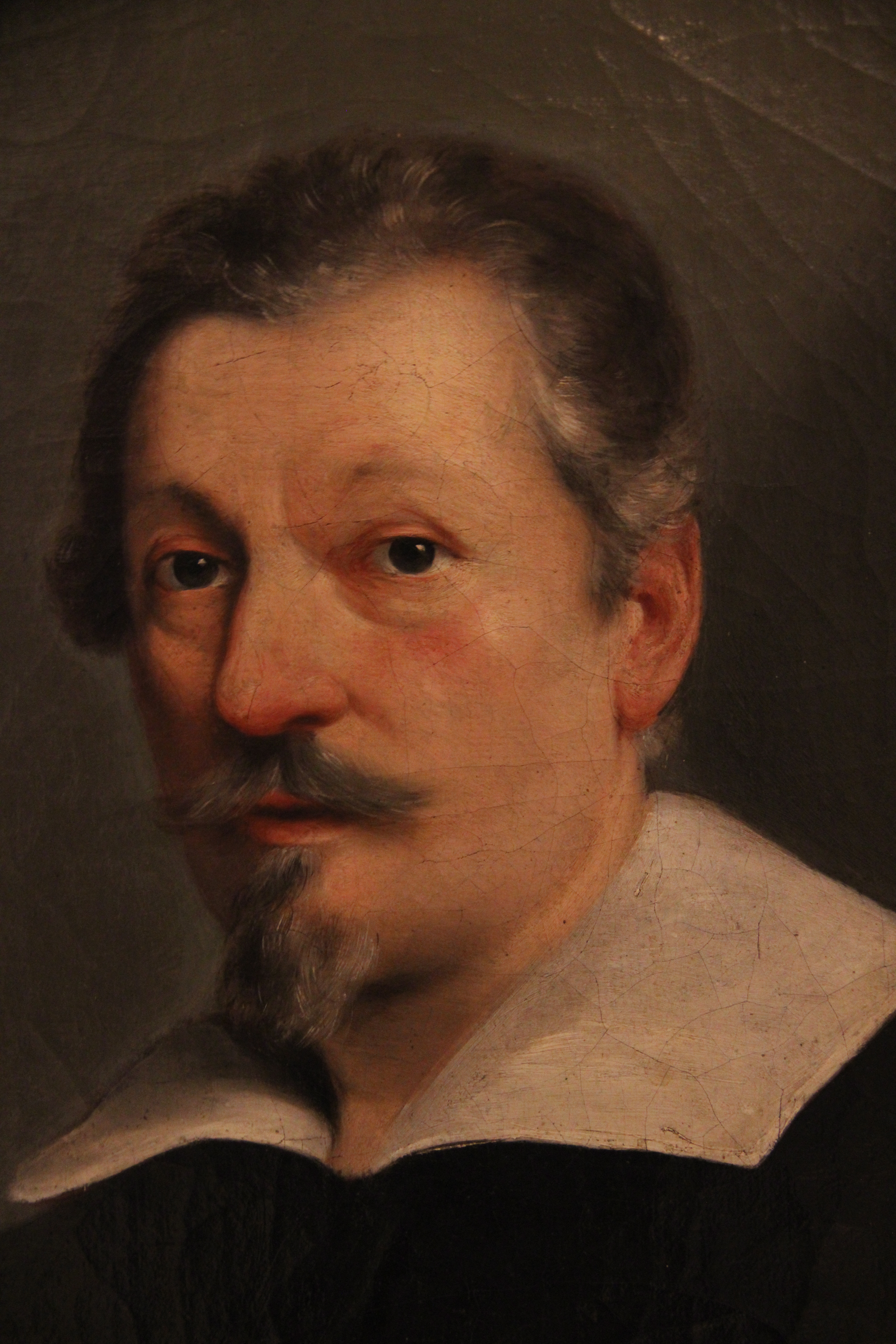
- Self-portrait, c. 1635, Pinacoteca Nazionale di Bologna
- Born: 17 March or 17 August 1578; Bologna, Romagna, Papal States (modern Bologna, Emilia-Romagna, Italy)
- Died: 4 October 1660 (aged 82); Bologna, Romagna, Papal States (modern Bologna, Emilia-Romagna, Italy)
- Education: Ludovico Carracci
- Occupation: Painter
- Notable work: Nativity of the Virgin (c. 1598)
- Movement: Baroque
- Patrons: Vincenzo Giustiniani

Signature
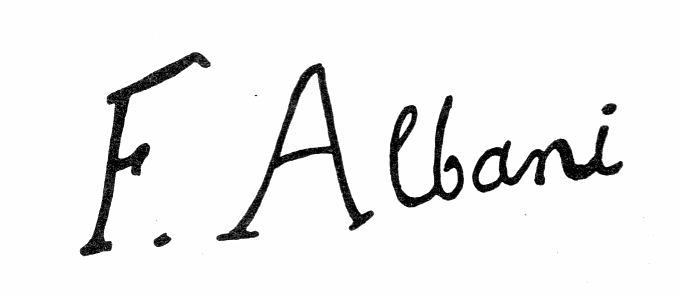

Francesco Albani or Albano (17 March or 17 August 1578 – 4 October 1660) was an Italian Baroque painter of Albanian descent who was active in Bologna (1591–1600; 1609; 1610; 1618–1622), Rome (1600–1609; 1610–1617; 1623–1625), Viterbo (1609–1610), Mantua (1621–1622) and Florence (1633). He was a distinguished artist of the Bolognese school, deeply influenced by Annibale Carracci’s classicism. His fame rests on his idyllic landscapes and small mythological pictures, the lyrical qualities of which earned him the soubriquet ‘the Anacreon of painters’.

== Biography ==
=== Early years in Bologna ===
Albani was born in Bologna, Papal States, in 1578, the second surviving son of Elisabetta Torri and Agostino Albani. His father was a silk merchant who intended his son to go into his own trade. By the age of twelve, however, he had become an apprentice to the competent mannerist painter Denis Calvaert, in whose studio he met Guido Reni. He soon followed Reni to the so-called "Academy" run by Annibale, Agostino, and Ludovico Carracci. This studio fostered the careers of many painters of the Bolognese school, including Domenichino, Massari, Viola, Lanfranco, Giovanni Francesco Grimaldi, Pietro Faccini, Remigio Cantagallina, and Guido Reni.

Albani studied for four years under Ludovico Carracci. Through his master, he secured his initial public commissions, which closely followed Ludovico's style. These were for Bolognese palazzi and churches, such as the Oratory of San Colombano, where his fresco of the Repentance of St. Peter (c. 1597–8) closely imitates the dramatic and emotional qualities of Ludovico’s manner, particularly in the expressive figure of the apostle and in the nocturnal lighting. The oratory’s altarpiece, painted in the same period, showing the Risen Christ Appearing to the Virgin, is, however, more indebted to Annibale Carracci for its general composition and individual motifs.

This change of mentor signalled a decisive shift in Albani’s approach, which increasingly inclined towards Annibale’s idealizing and classicizing style. According to Carlo Cesare Malvasia, Albani’s work in San Colombano stood out from that of the other Carracci pupils for its invention and expression. An altarpiece painted in 1599, the Virgin and Child Enthroned with St. Catherine of Alexandria and St. Mary Magdalene in Santi Fabiano e Sebastiano, Bologna, marks the start of Albani’s career as an independent master. This, his first dated work, exemplifies the elements of his initial style. Its composition is indebted to Annibale’s altarpiece of the Virgin and Child Enthroned (1593; Pinacoteca Nazionale di Bologna), while the intimate mood, slight figural proportions, graceful attitudes, sfumato and sweet facial expressions reflect Albani’s study of Antonio da Correggio.

=== Mature work in Rome ===
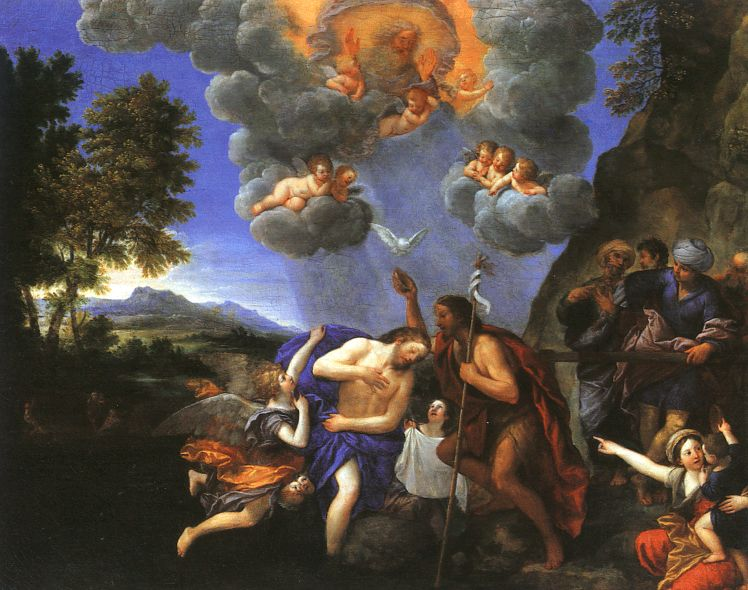
Baptism of Christ, c. 1640, Hermitage Museum, Saint Petersburg

In 1600, Albani moved to Rome to work on the fresco decoration of the gallery of the Palazzo Farnese, which was being completed by the studio of Annibale Carracci. At this time, Rome, under Clement VIII Aldobrandini (1592–1605), was exhibiting some degree of administrative stability and renewed artistic patronage. While Pope Clement had been born into a Florentine family resident in Urbino, his family was allied by marriage to the Emilia-Romagna and the Farnese, since Ranuccio I Farnese, Duke of Parma had married Margherita Aldobrandini. Parma, like Bologna, being part of the Region of Emilia-Romagna, it was not surprising that Cardinal Odoardo Farnese, Ranuccio's brother, chose to patronise the Carraccis from Bologna, thereby establishing Bolognese dominance of Roman fresco painting for nearly two decades.

Albani became one of Annibale's most prominent apprentices. Using Annibale's designs and assisted by Lanfranco and Sisto Badalocchio, Albani completed frescoes for the San Diego Chapel in San Giacomo degli Spagnoli between 1602 and 1607. Elaborating on Annibale’s sketches, Albani learnt to design classicizing compositions in which monumental figures enact the narrative through expressive gesture. He also supervised the completion of the Aldobrandini lunettes (c. 1604–5 / 1610–13; Rome, Galleria Doria Pamphilj), left unfinished on Annibale’s death in 1609. The lunette of the Landscape with the Assumption shows Albani’s assimilation of his mentor’s landscape style: small figures move against a grand landscape, the idealized forms of which complement the sacred narrative.

The success of Albani’s work for Annibale led to several major Roman fresco commissions. In 1606–7, Albani completed the frescoes in the Palazzo Mattei di Giove in Rome. He later completed two other frescoes in the same palace, also on the theme of Life of Joseph.

In 1609, he completed the ceiling of a large hall with Fall of Phaeton and Council of the Gods for the Palazzo Giustiniani (now Palazzo Odescalchi) at Bassano (di Sutri) Romano, the country residence of Vincenzo Giustiniani, also famous as a patron of Caravaggio. The ceiling’s design surprisingly rejects the architectonic structure of Annibale’s ceiling in the Farnese Gallery (1597–1608; Rome, Palazzo Farnese) and instead turns to the tradition of illusionistic ceilings with a unified expanse of open sky. The figural composition retains, however, classical equilibrium and legibility. A preparatory nude study of Phaeton (Windsor Castle, Berkshire, Royal Library), in black chalk heightened with white, clearly reveals Annibale’s influence and is a good example of Albani’s draughtsmanship.

During 1612–14, Albani completed the Choir frescoes at the church of Santa Maria della Pace, which had just been remodelled by Pietro da Cortona. In 1616, he painted ceiling frescoes of Apollo and the Seasons at Palazzo Verospi in Via del Corso for the cardinal Fabrizio Verospi.

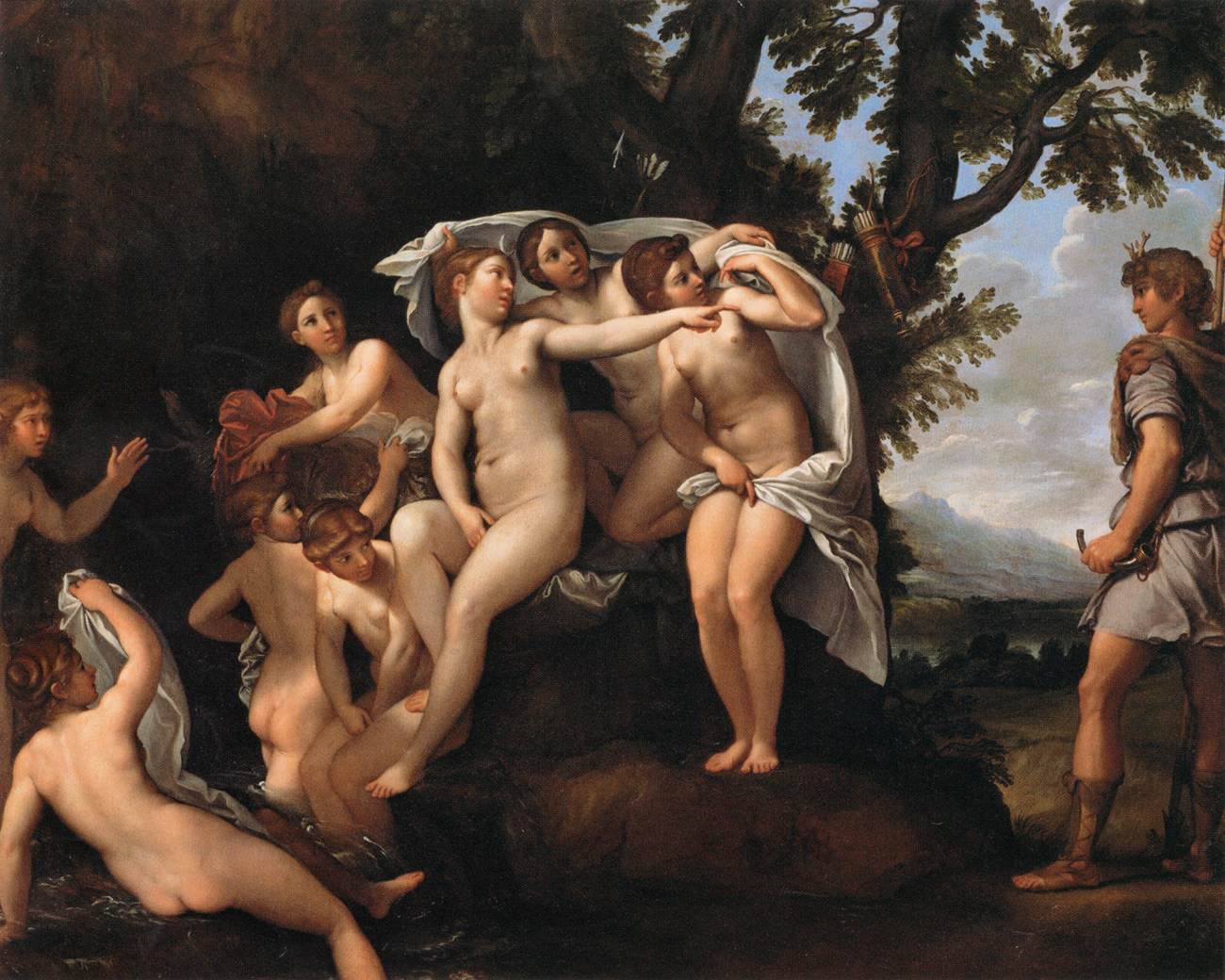
Diana and Actaeon, c. 1614–16, Paris, Louvre

Unlike his contemporaries and compatriots, Reni, Domenichino and Giovanni Lanfranco, Albani received no major commissions for altarpieces in Rome, but his reputation grew nonetheless through his frescoes and his numerous cabinet pictures illustrating devotional or mythological subjects. In such small paintings on copper as Diana and Actaeon (c. 1614–16; Paris, Louvre) he created a personal manner, characterized by graceful and delicate, usually female, figures with softened contours set against gentle landscapes.

In Rome, Albani developed a mutual, though respectful, rivalry with the more successful Guido Reni, who was also heavily patronized by the Aldobrandini, and under whom Albani had worked at the chapel of the Quirinal Palace.

Albani's best frescoes are those on mythological subjects. Among the best of his sacred subjects are a St Sebastian and an Assumption of the Virgin, both in the church of San Sebastiano fuori le Mura in Rome. He was among the Italian painters who devoted themselves to painting cabinet pictures. His mythological subjects include The Sleeping Venus, Diana in the Bath, Danaë Reclining, Galatea on the Sea, and Europa on the Bull. A rare etching, the Death of Dido, is attributed to him.

=== Bologna, after 1617 ===
Following the death of his wife, Albani returned to Bologna, where he married a second time and lived until his death. In Bologna, Albani established a large studio that rivalled Reni’s for the most important public commissions. His main work became the painting of large-scale altarpieces for Bolognese and provincial churches and easel pictures for an international clientele. Cupids and cherubs increasingly populate both his secular and sacred paintings, perhaps reflecting his growing family, which by 1643 numbered 12 children. His biographers ascribed the vivacity of his highly praised putti to their being modelled on his own babies.

In the 1630s, Albani also began a treatise on painting, the general content of which is known from the excerpts of his notes published in Malvasia’s biography. Albani’s theories for the most part reflect the current classic–idealist stance, emphasizing the importance of invention and the artist’s education and sharply criticizing the naturalism of Caravaggio and his followers. As is evident from a later exchange of letters (1651) with his pupil Andrea Sacchi, Albani had little regard for the northern Bamboccianti in Rome, although his comments show an unexpected appreciation of their paintings’ satirical and humorous content.

Albani’s mature Bolognese altarpieces differ, in their classicizing compositions and monumental figures, from his early altarpieces, reflecting the artist’s intervening Roman experience. In the two most significant, the Allegory of the Passion (1627–32; Bologna, Madonna di Galliera, Cappella Cagnoli) and the Annunciation ‘dal bell’angelo’ (1632; Bologna, San Bartolomeo), he responded to contemporary piety with novel imagery. In the Allegory of the Passion the traditional themes of redemption and penitence are accompanied by allusions, typical of Counter-Reformation thought, to the Double Trinity and to the Christ Child’s foreknowledge of his fate. In the Annunciation the standing Virgin and God the Father’s presence are in the tradition of 16th-century Bolognese painting, but the figure of Gabriel, dubbed the ‘bell’angelo’ by Malvasia, was, though idealized, conceived in the most modern idiom, full and vibrant in form.

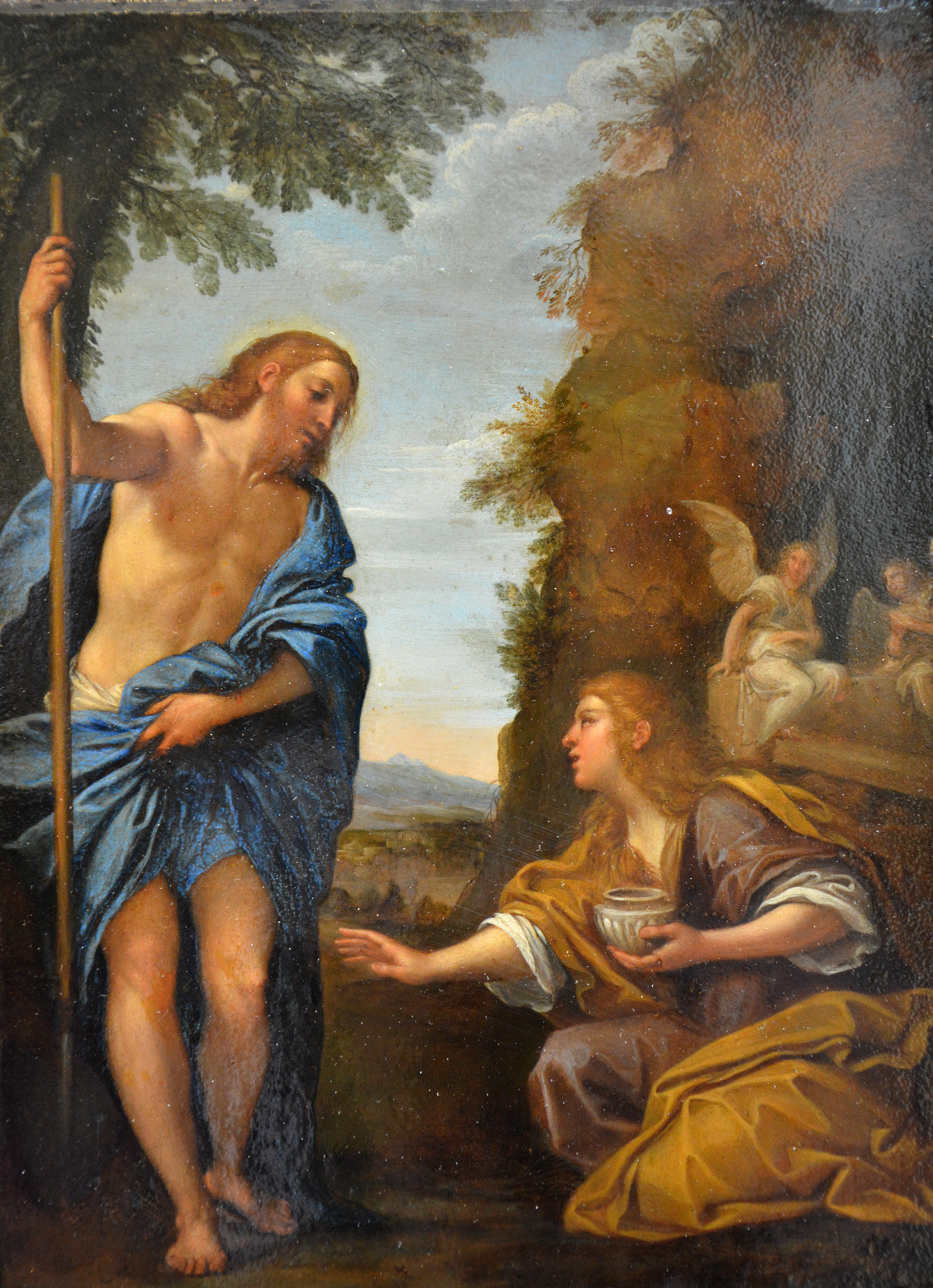
Noli me tangere, c. 1620, Paris, Louvre

Both compositions are deliberately simple and legible but mitigate a formal severity reminiscent of Reni’s and Domenichino’s later Bolognese altarpieces with charming individual details, such as Gabriel’s soft ringlets and swirling garments or the delightful cherubs in the Annunciation. Albani’s last important altarpiece, the Noli me tangere (1644; Bologna, Santa Maria dei Servi), illustrates his final stylistic phase, in which he employed a more slender figure type with stylized poses and gestures. This heightened refinement reflects his imitation of Reni’s second manner of the 1630s and finds echoes in Guercino’s works after 1640.

Albani’s mature Bolognese altarpieces bequeathed the principles of the Carracci reform of painting to his pupils and to younger Bolognese artists. Extensive workshop assistance and the execution of many replicas of accounts, however, for the decline in quality of works datable after 1645. Albani’s idyllic landscapes assumed an important place in his mature artistic activity. His mythological fables set in landscapes evoking the Bolognese countryside were seen as the visual equivalent of the classically inspired idylls by the poet Giambattista Marino and can also be likened to the lyric verse of the Bolognese poet Claudio Achillini.

The most important examples of this genre are the four cycles that Albani painted between 1617 and 1634. The first was the Loves of Venus and Diana (c. 1617; Rome, Galleria Borghese) for Cardinal Scipione Borghese. Albani invented a narrative that unfolds across the cycle’s four roundels, loosely following Ovid’s fable of Venus and Adonis and also borrowing from Marino’s epic L’Adone (Paris and Turin, 1623). Small in scale, the figures move with consummate grace and are set in front of deep vistas punctuated by meadows, lakes and hazy mountains. The cycle’s novel imagery, charming motifs and allegorical allusions earned Albani a reputation for inventiveness and elicited further commissions. His early critics judged this to be one of his finest works, along with his other three cycles on related poetic themes: that begun in 1621 for Ferdinando Gonzaga, 6th Duke of Mantua, and finished in 1633 for Prince Giancarlo de' Medici (Paris, Louvre); the Four Elements (1625–8; Turin, Galleria Sabauda) for Cardinal Prince Maurice of Savoy; and the cycle (1634; Fontainebleau, Château) for Jacques Le Veneur, Comte de Carrouges.

In subject-matter, composition and mood, these works help define the ideal landscape tradition, but their looser structure and softer handling, which reveal study of Titian’s Bacchanals (London, National Gallery; Madrid, Museo del Prado), contrast with Annibale Carracci’s or Domenichino’s landscapes. They most closely parallel, with their luminous skies, towering trees and deep panoramas, Claude Lorrain’s contemporaneous landscapes.

=== Legacy ===
Albani never acquired the monumentality or tenebrism that was quaking the contemporary world of painters, and is often derided for his lyric, cherubim-filled sweetness, which often has not yet shaken the mannerist elegance. While Albani's theme would have appealed to Poussin, he lacked the Frenchman's muscular drama. His style sometimes seems to have more in common with the decorative Rococo than with the painting of his own time.

Albani’s studio, which he opened in Bologna about 1618, served as both a school for artists and a workshop to execute the master’s designs. His most famous pupils included his brother Giovanni Battista Albani, and others including Francesco Mola, Giovanni Francesco Grimaldi, Giacinto Bellini, Girolamo Bonini, Antonio Catalani, Carlo Cignani, Giovanni Maria Galli, Bartolommeo Morelli, Andrea Sacchi, Andrea Sghizzi, Emilio Taruffi, and Francesco Vaccaro. Albani’s importance as a transmitter of the classical ideal was recognized by Giovanni Pietro Bellori, who traced a line of descent from the Carracci through Albani to Sacchi and to Sacchi’s pupil Carlo Maratta. A similar chain links Albani to Cignani and his pupil Marcantonio Franceschini, the protagonists of the pastoral mode in Bologna. Less well-known artists, such as Giovanni Battista Mola, assisted in the studio’s large production of cabinet pictures and closely imitated Albani’s style.

Albani’s reputation was high in his own lifetime and throughout most of the 18th century. His biographers and critics ranked him among the leading painters and especially singled out his cabinet pictures for praise, remarking on their high prices. The small-scale, exquisitely finished panels appealed especially to French collectors, as André Félibien and the inventories of French estates attest. At the end of the 17th century, Louis XIV had a large collection of cabinet pictures by Albani, more than by any other Bolognese painter. The sensuous elegance of Albani’s nymphs, the appealing putti and idyllic landscapes inspired French court painters, such as Bon and Louis de Boullogne, and anticipated François Boucher’s pastorals. In the 19th century, a general change in taste resulted in the disparagement of the Bolognese school and a negative appraisal of Albani’s works, which were judged frivolous and repetitive. Modern scholarship has reappraised the importance of Albani’s large-scale works and recognized his contribution to landscape painting.

== Major works ==
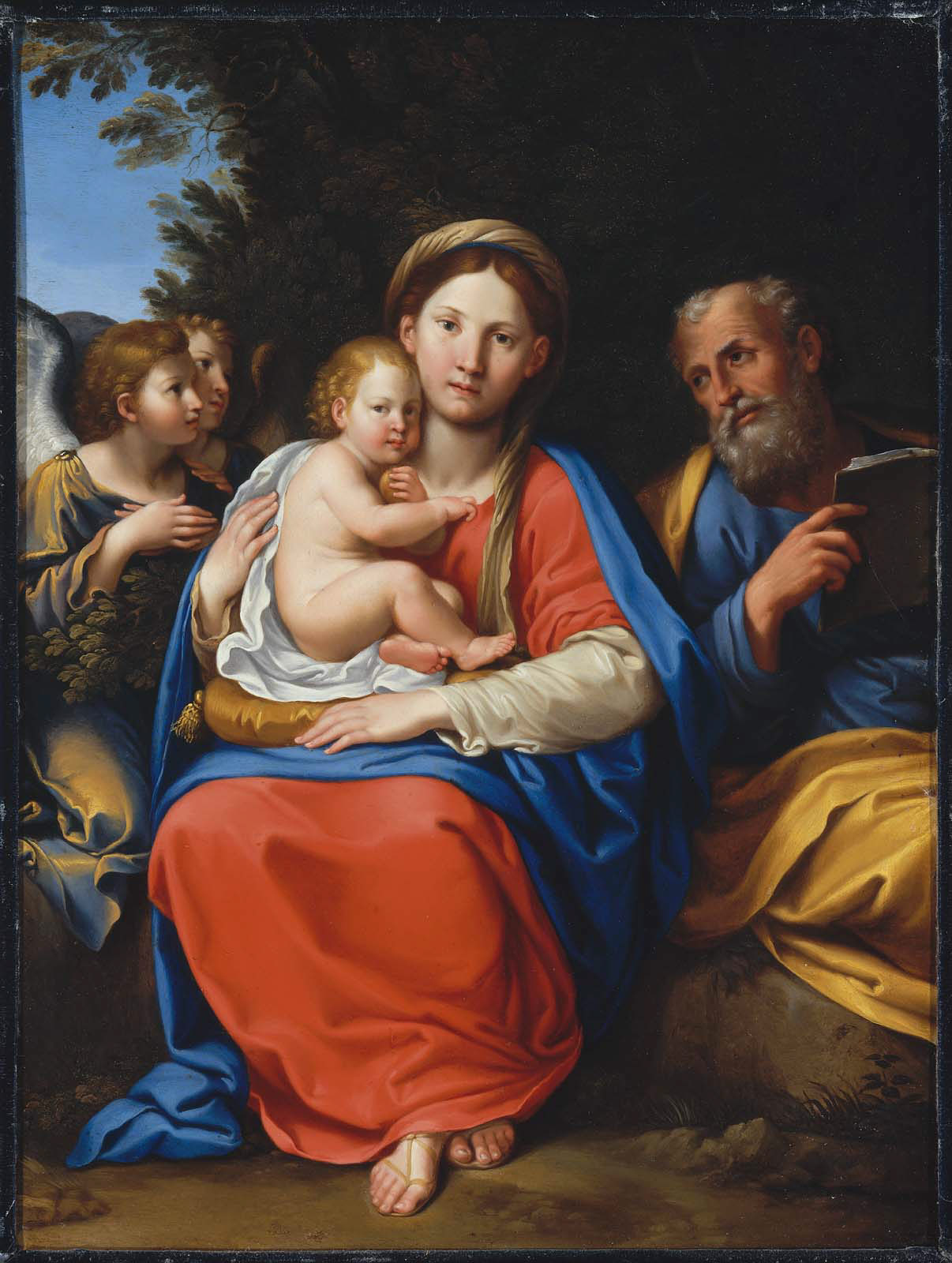
Holy Family with Angels, Museum of Fine Arts, Boston

- See Chronological List of paintings by Francesco Albani
- Frescoes in Hall of Aeneas – Palazzo Fava, Bologna
- Frescoes in Oratory of San Colombano – Bologna
- Frescoes in Hall of Aeneas (1601–1602) – Palazzo Doria Pamphilj, Rome
- Frescoes for San Giacomo degli Spagnoli (1602–1607) – Museo del Prado and in National Art Museum of Catalonia
- Holy Family with Angels (1608–1610) – MFA, Boston
- Allegorical canvases of the seasons Spring, Summer, Fall and Winter (1616–1617) – Galleria Borghese, Rome
- Nativity of the Virgin (1598) – Pinacoteca, Museo Capitolino, Rome
- Baptism of Christ (c. 1620) – Oil on canvas, 428.5 x 224.5 cm, Pinacoteca Nazionale di Bologna
- Diana and Actaeon (1625–1630) – Oil on wood transferred to canvas, 74,5 x 99,5 cm, Gemäldegalerie, Dresden
- Four Elements (1628–1630) – Pinacoteca, Turin
- Holy Family with Angels (1630–1635) – Oil on canvas, 57 x 43 cm, Palazzo Pitti, Florence
- Self-Portrait (c. 1630) – Oil on canvas, 75 x 59.5 cm, Pinacoteca Nazionale di Bologna
- Venus Attended by Nymphs and Cupids (1633) –Oil on canvas, 114 x 171 cm, Prado, Madrid)
- Annunciation (1633) – Church of San Bartolomeo, Bologna
- The Annunciation – Oil on copper, 62 x 47 cm, Hermitage, St. Petersburg
- Madonna with Child in Glory with Sts. Jerome and Francis (c. 1640) – Oil on copper, 43.5 x 31.8 cm, Pinacoteca Nazionale di Bologna
- The Baptism of Christ (c. 1640) – Oil on canvas, 268 x 195 cm, Hermitage, St. Petersburg
- The Rape of Europa (c. 1640–1645) – Oil on canvas, 170 x 224 cm, Hermitage, St. Petersburg
- Annunciation (c. 1640-1645) – Oil on copper, 62 x 47 cm, Hermitage, St. Petersburg
- The Holy Women at Christ's Tomb (1640s–1650s) – Oil on canvas, 170 x 224 cm, Hermitage, St. Petersburg
- Danza degli amorini – Pinacoteca di Brera, Milan
- Tondo Borghese – Galleria Borghese, Rome
- Tasso's landscapes – Galleria Colonna, Rome
- Holy Family – Church of Madonna di Galliera, Bologna

== Works owned by the Musée du Louvre ==
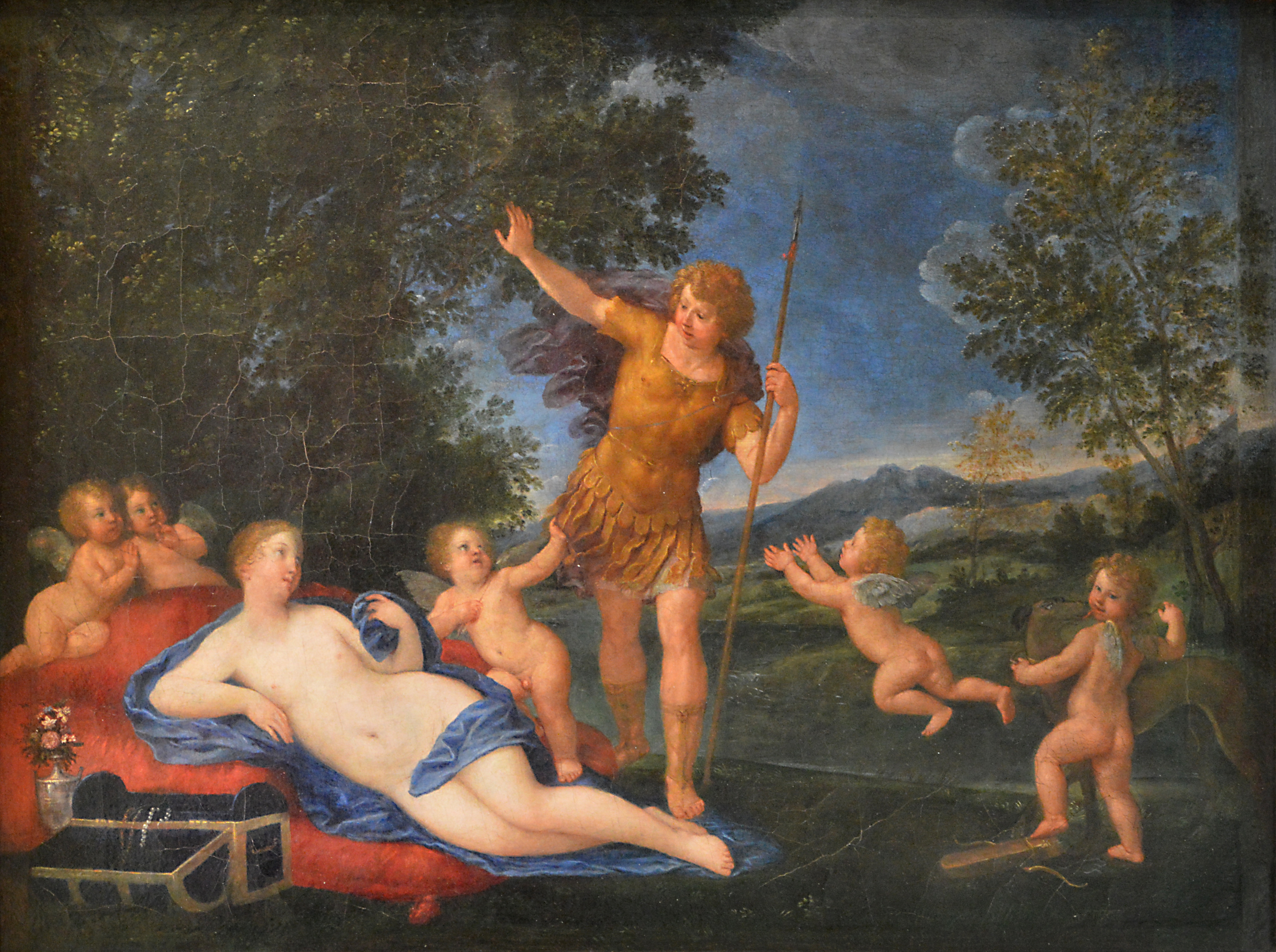
Venus and Adonis, oil on canvas, Louvre, Paris

- Actaeon Changed into a Stag (c. 1630)
- Actaeon Changed into a Stag (c. 1617)
- Adonis Led by Cupids to Venus (1621–1633)
- Apollo and Daphne (c. 1615–1620)
- The Lamentation of Christ (c. 1601–1602)
- The Toilet of Venus (1621–1633)
- The Annunciation (c. 1620–1625)
- Christ Appearing to Mary Magdalene / Noli me tangere (c. 1620–1625)
- The Eternal Father and the Angel Gabriel (c. 1650–1660)
- Venus and Vulcan Resting (1621–1633)
- Nymphs Disarming Cupids (1621–1633)
- Saint Francis of Assisi Praying Before a Crucifix (c. 1630–1650)
- Salmacis and Hermaphroditus (c. 1630–1640)
- Venus and Adonis (c. 1630–1640)
- The Nativity (c. 1600), attributed
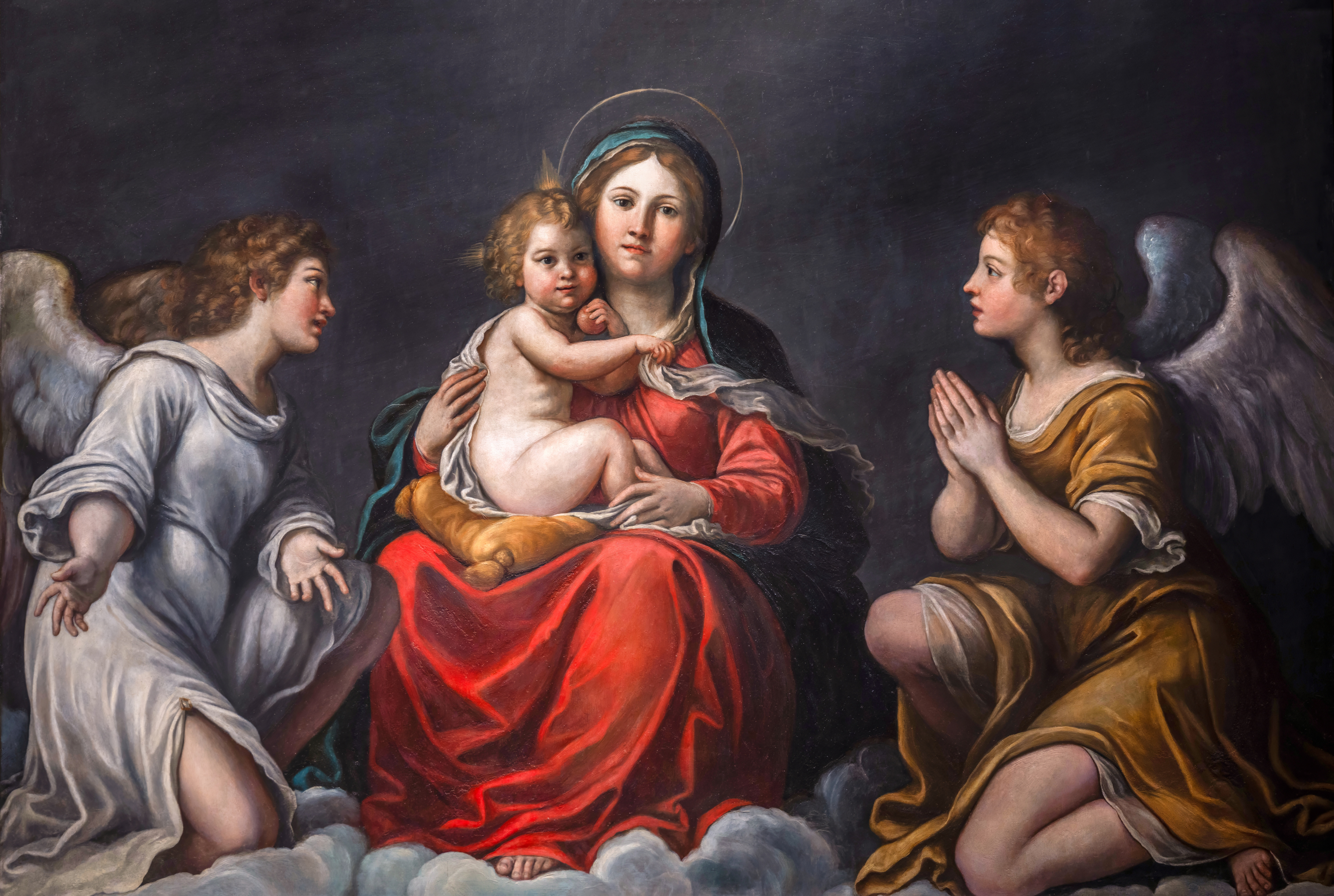
Madonna with the Child and Angels, 1610-1615, oil on slate, Capitoline Museums, Rome

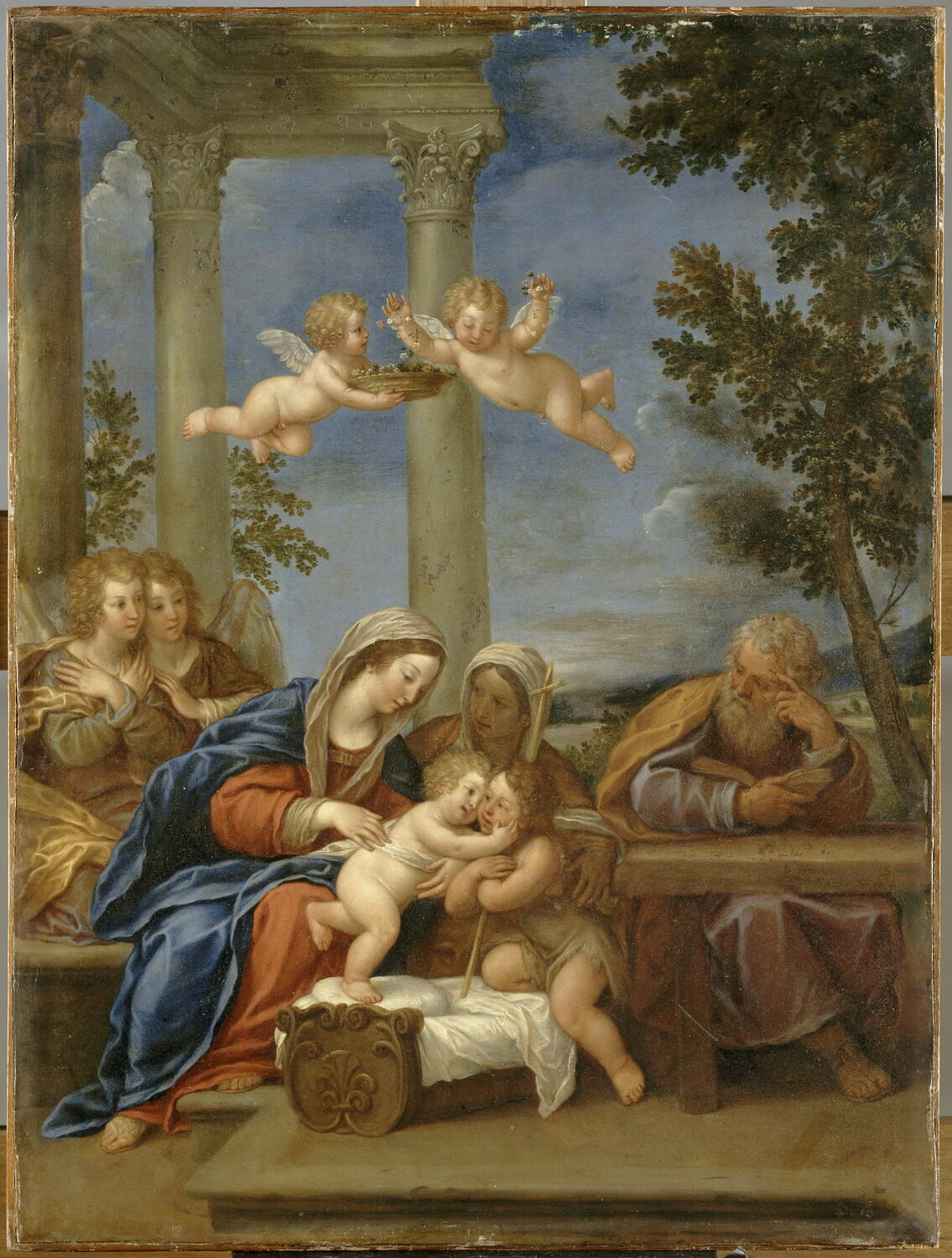
Holy family, Musée des Beaux-Arts et d'Archéologie de Besançon

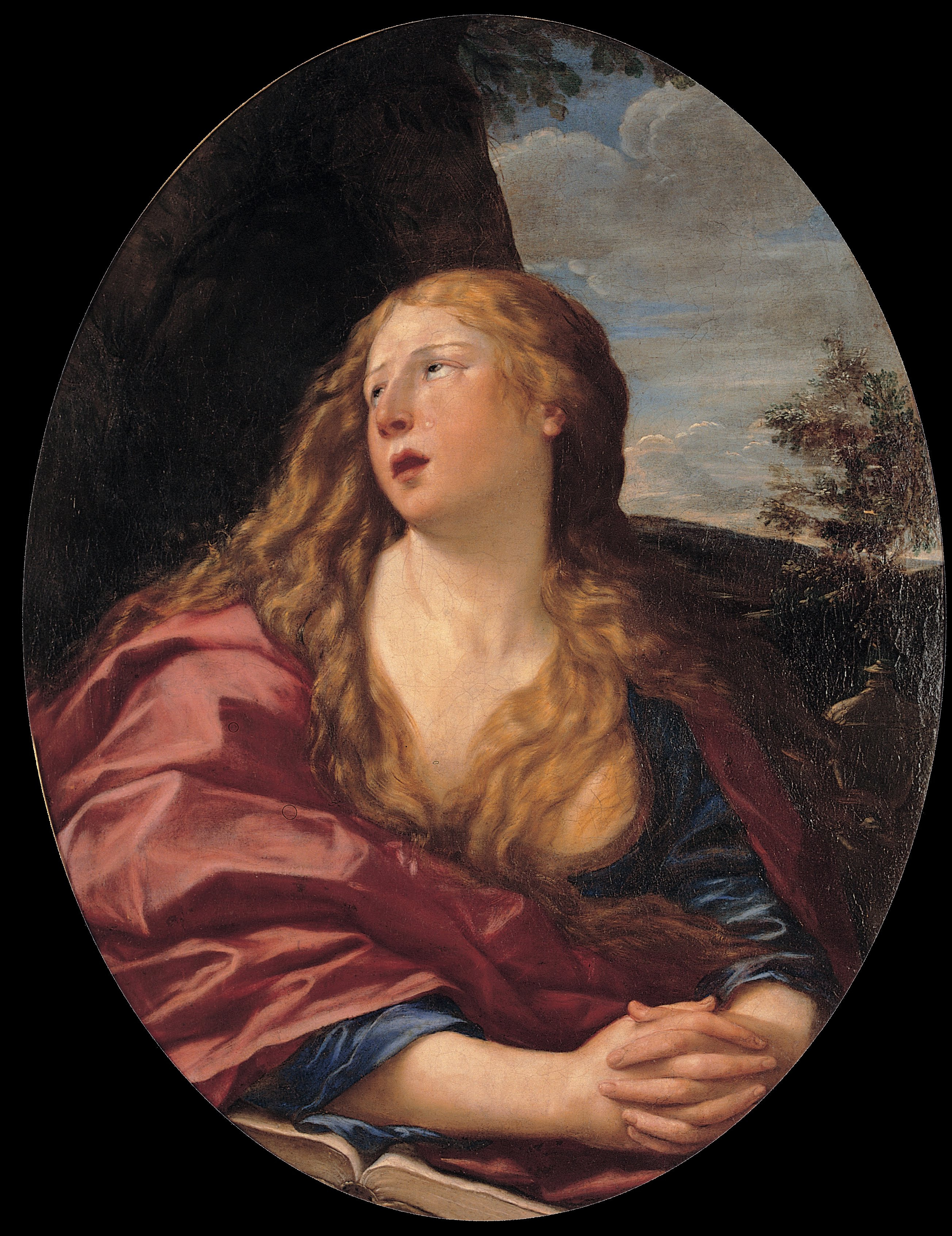
Penitent Magdalene, Capitoline Museums, Rome

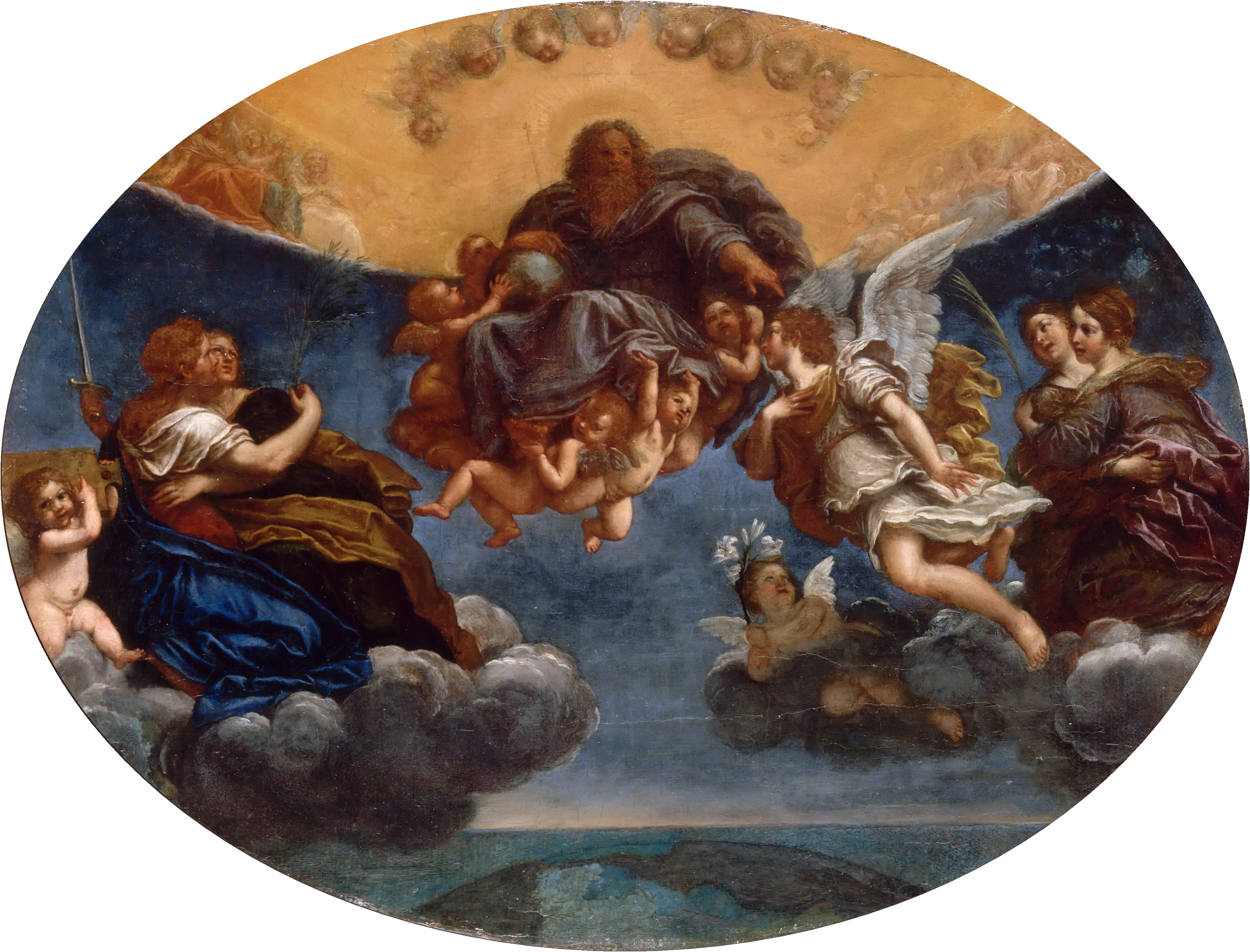
Eternal Father and Archangel Gabriel, Paris, Louvre

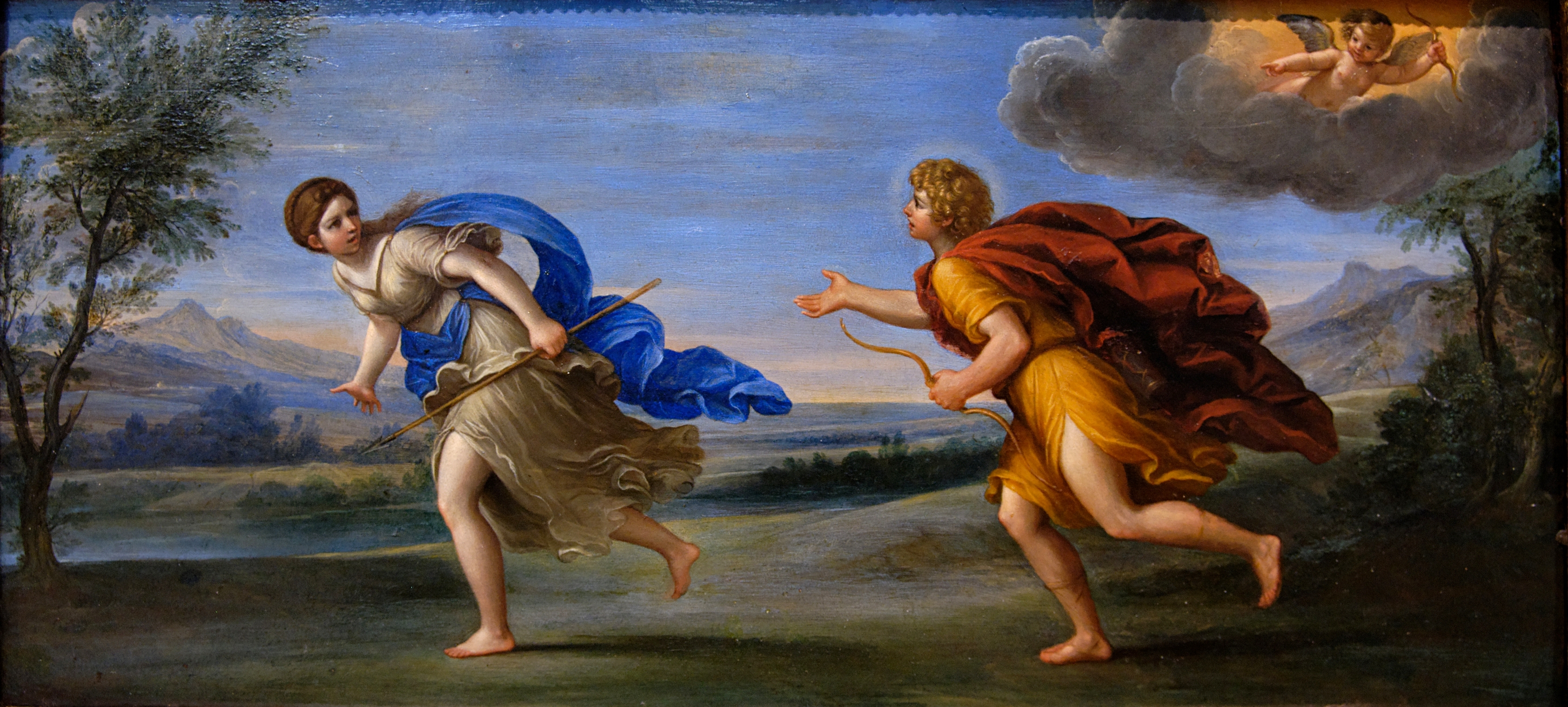
Apollo and Daphne, Paris, Louvre

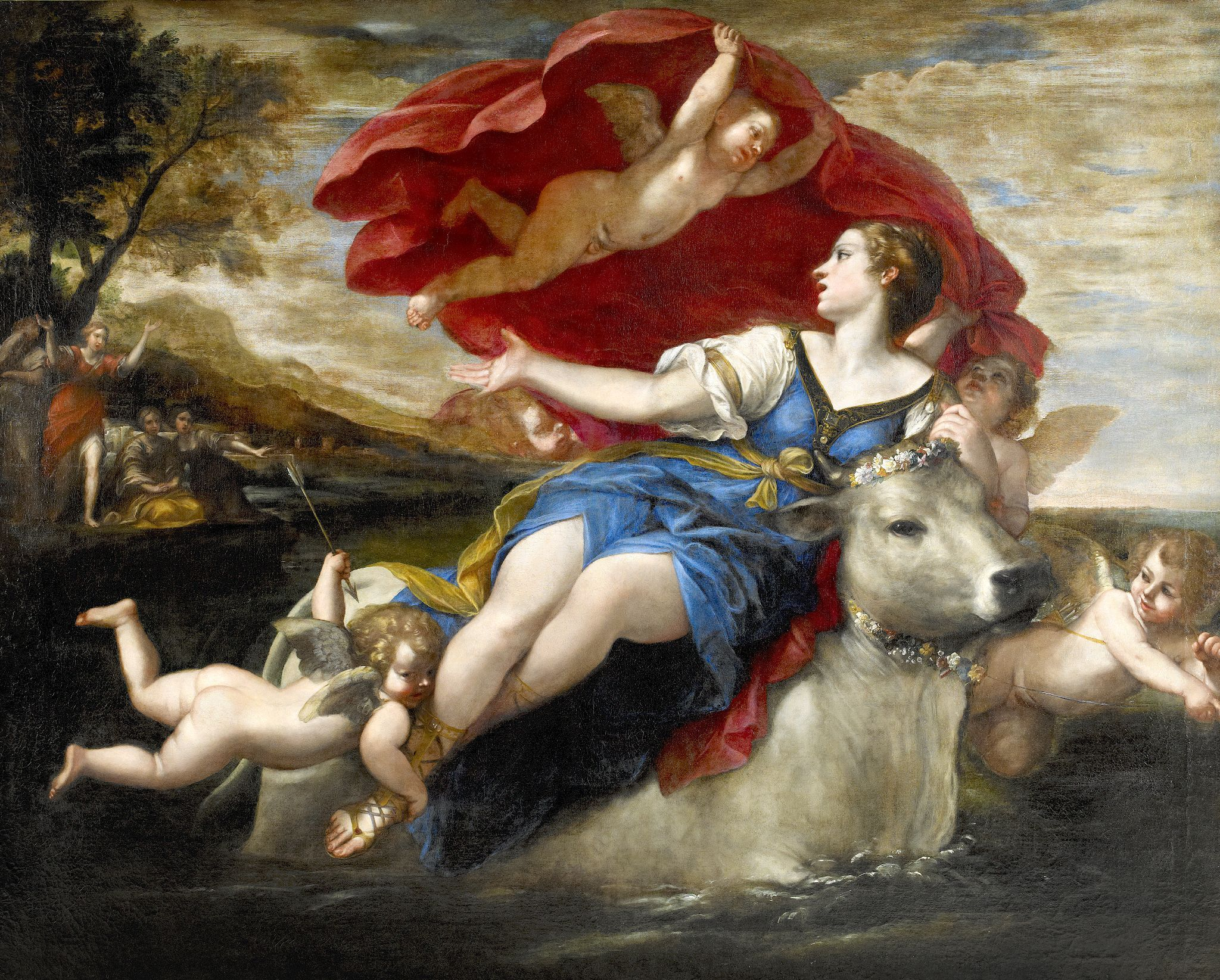
The Rape of Europa, Hermitage Museum, Saint Petersburg

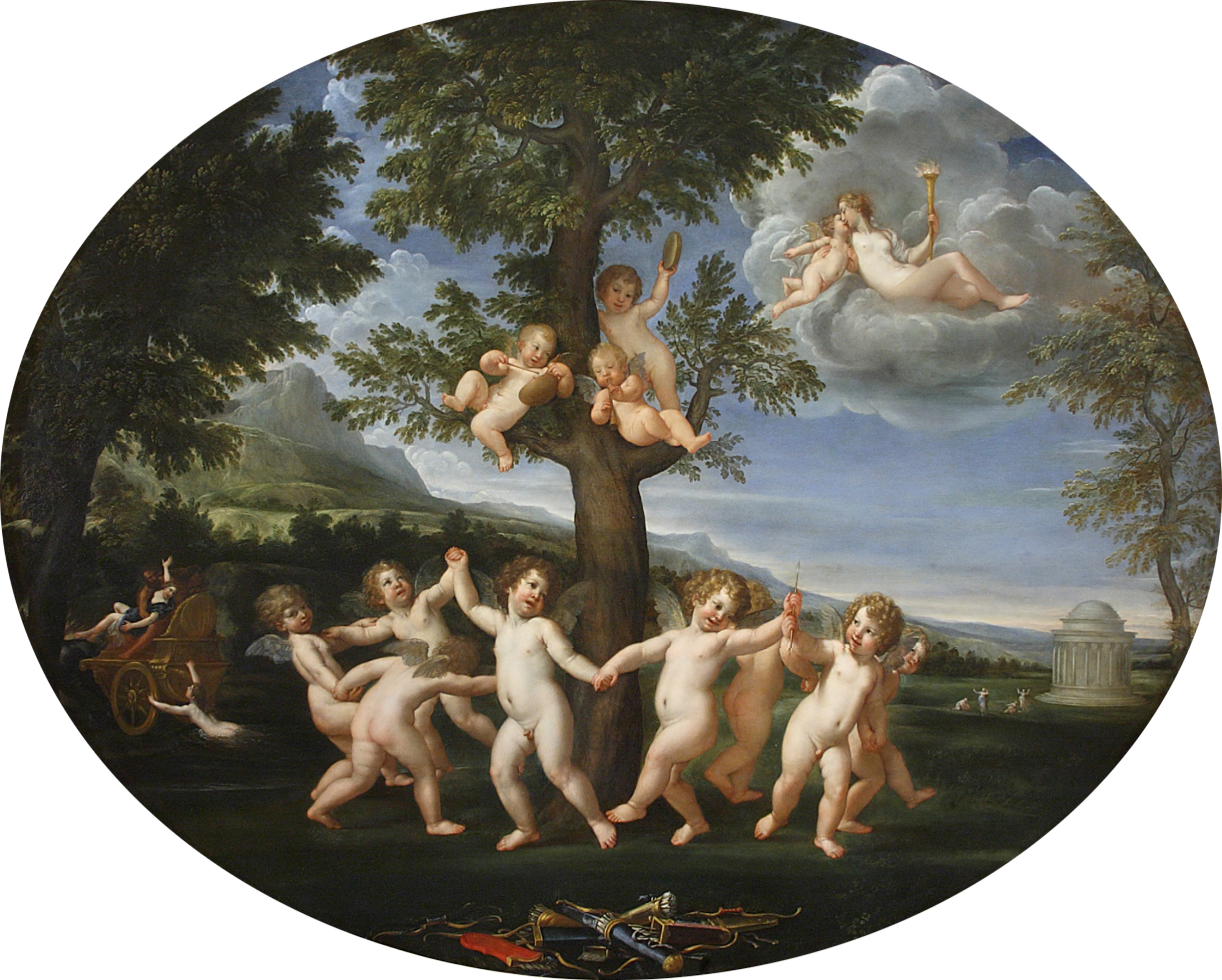
Danza degli amorini (1620-1630), Pinacoteca di Brera, Milan

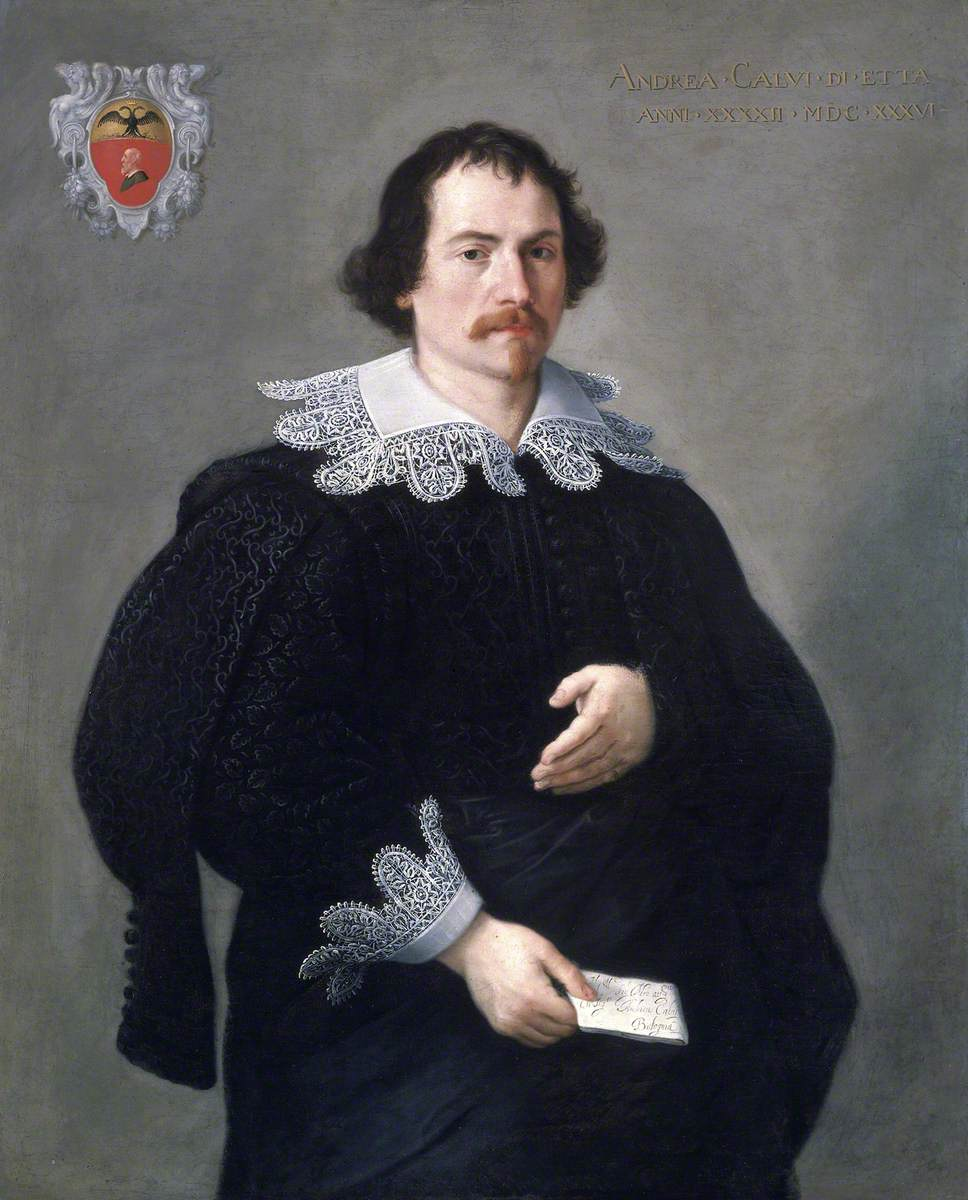
Portrait of Andrea Calvi, National Museum Cardiff

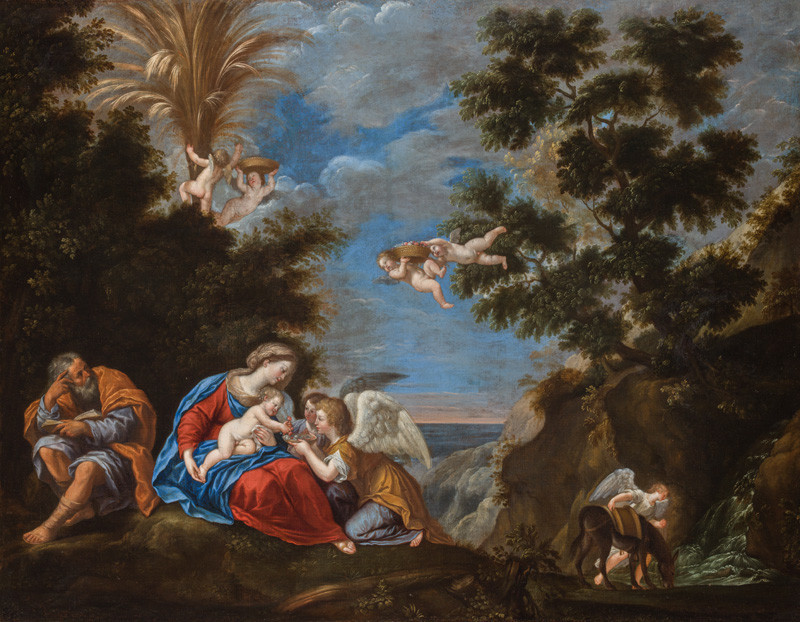
Rest on the Flight into Egypt, National Gallery Prague

== Sources ==
- Boschetto, Antonio (1960). "ALBANI, Francesco". Dizionario Biografico degli Italiani (in Italian). Vol. 1: Aaron–Albertucci. Rome: Istituto dell'Enciclopedia Italiana. OCLC 883370.
- Malvasia, Carlo Cesare. Felsina pittrice (1678); ed. M. Brascaglia (1971), 2, pp. 149–99 [most detailed early biography].
- Wittkower, Rudolf (1993). Art and Architecture Italy, 1600-1750. London: Penguin Books, Pelican History of Art. pp. 78–80, 82–83.
- Puglisi, Catherine (1999). Francesco Albani. New Haven: Yale University Press. ISBN 978-0300067996.
- Puglisi, Catherine R. (2003). "Albani, Francesco". Grove Art Online. Oxford University Press. doi:10.1093/gao/9781884446054.article.T001466.
