= Lippo di Dalmasio =

Italian painter

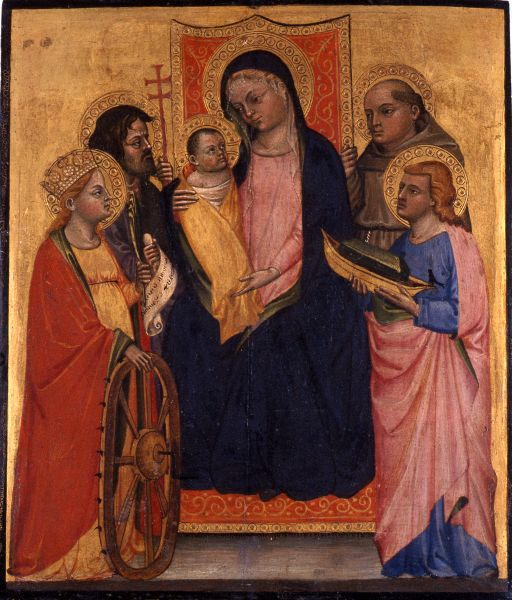
Enthroned Madonna with Child and Four Saints, c. 1400 Tempera and gold on poplar 30.2 x 25.8 cm

Filippo Scannabecchi (1352 – c. 1410), known as Lippo di Dalmasio, was an Italian painter from Bologna, a son of Dalmasio Scannabecchi.

== Biography ==
His father was Dalmasio Scannabecchi (sometimes referred to as pseudo-Dalmasio), a Bolognese painter from a minor noble family who migrated to Pistoia during a period of Guelph rule in Bologna. Lippo presumably trained both with his father and his paternal uncle Simone dei Crocefissi. While still a boy he was accompanied to Pistoia by his uncle. Recorded as a Bolognese citizen resident in Pistoia in 1377 (and present in both Bologna and Pistoia in 1385) he eventually returned to Bologna in 1389. Part of the school of Vitale da Bologna, he was also influenced by Tuscan artists such as Andrea di Cione (Orcagna) and his brothers Jacopo and Nardo. Between 1391 and 1410 he painted many depictions of the Virgin and Child, some of which are signed. These led to him being nicknamed in the 16th century Lippo delle Madonne, and he is among the early Bolognese painters mentioned by Carlo Cesare Malvasia in Felsina Pittrice (1678).

=== Name confusion ===
The name 'Muratori', by which one or two writers have styled him, really belongs to Teresa Scannabecchi, a seventeenth-century female painter.

== Sources ==
- Pini, Raffaella (2005). Il mondo dei pittori a Bologna, 1348–1430 (in Italian). Bologna: Clueb. ISBN 978-88-491-2444-6.
