= Angiola Teresa Moratori Scanabecchi =

Italian artist, composer (1662–1708)

Angiola Teresa Moratori Scanabecchi (1662 – 19 April 1708) was an Italian composer and painter.

== Biography ==
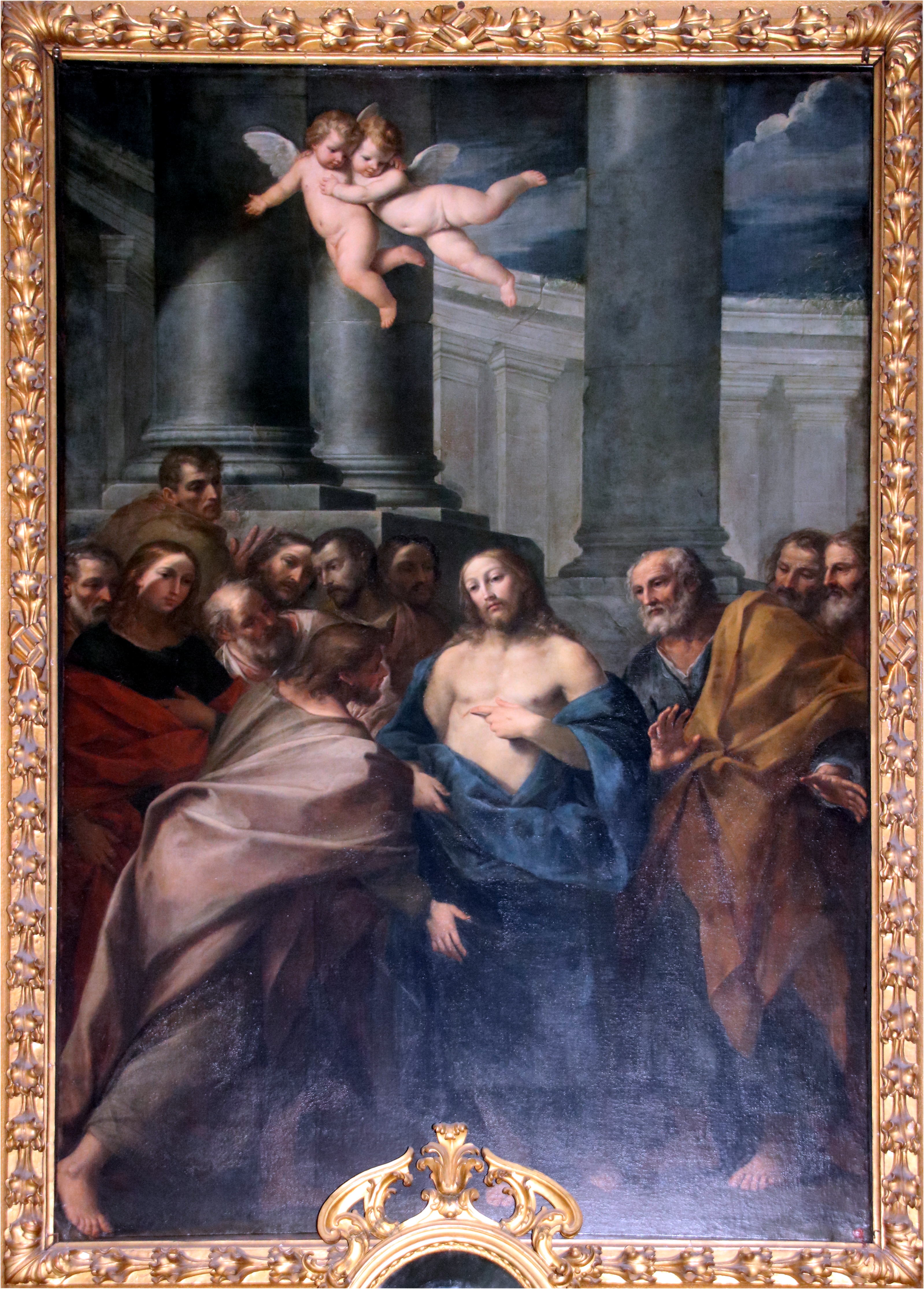
The Profession of Faith of St. Thomas the Apostle, Church of San Filippo Neri (Bologna)

Angiola Moratori was born in Bologna, the daughter of a Bolognese physician, and married Tomaso Scanabecchi Monetta. She studied instrumental performance, singing and painting and composed oratorios, the scores of which have been lost. Her paintings are housed in churches, Santo Stefano in Bologna, San Giovanni in Monte in Bologna, Madonna di Galliera in Bologna, and San Domenico in Ferrara. Scanabecchi died in Bologna and is buried in Madonna di Galliera beneath her painting of St. Tommaso.

== Works ==
Selected musical works, each with libretto by Giancomo Antonio Bergamori, include:

- Il martirio di Santa Colomba (1689)
- Li giochi di Sansone (1694)
- L'Esterre (1695)
- Cristo morto (1696)
