= Antonio Vallisneri =

Italian medical scientist, physician and naturalist

Doctor of Medicine Antonio Vallisneri FRS
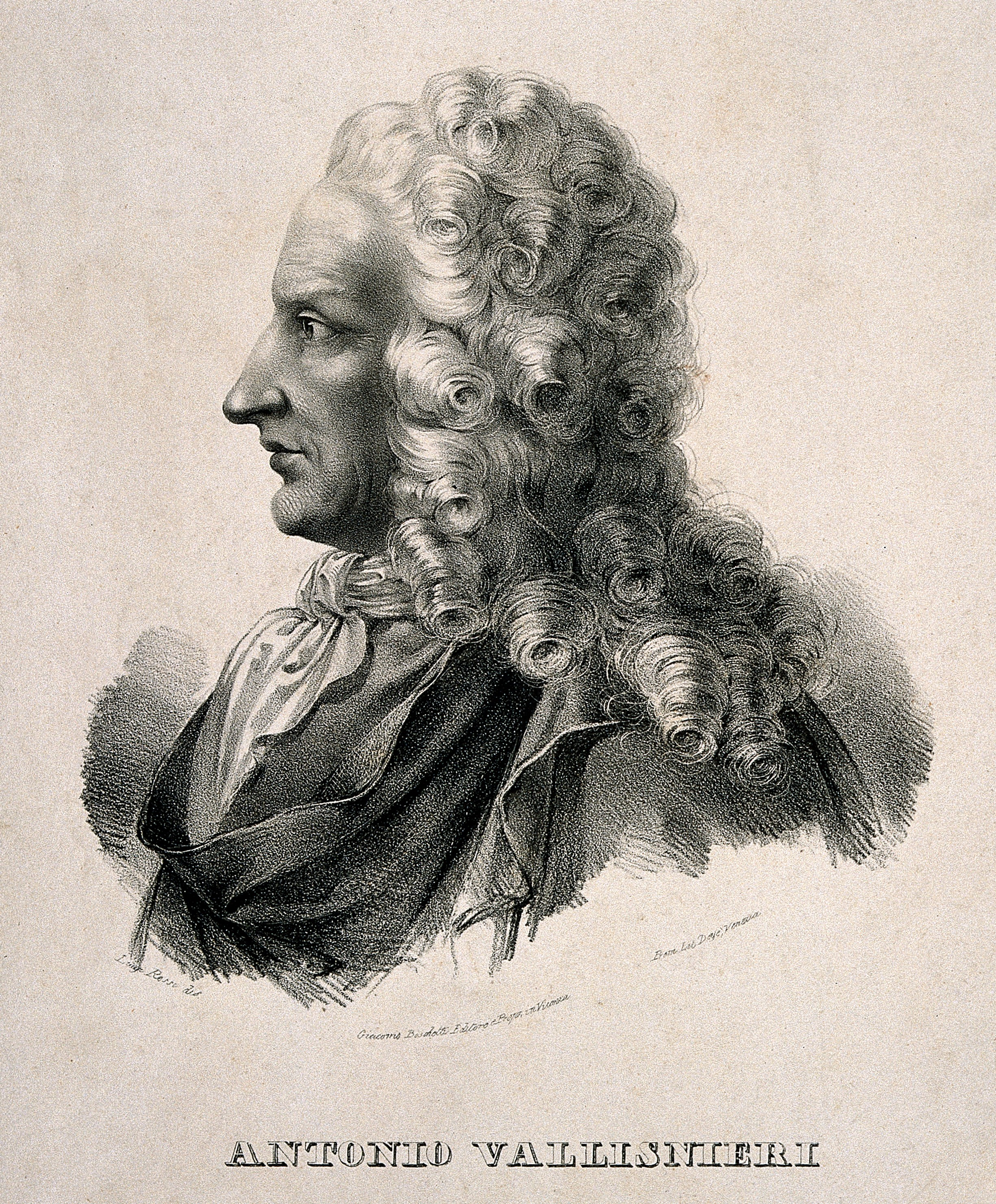
- Antonio Vallisnieri
- Born: 3 May 1661; Trassilico, Duchy of Modena and Reggio
- Died: 18 January 1730 (aged 68); Padua, Republic of Venice
- Burial place: Santa Caterina d'Alessandria, Padua
- Occupations: Physician; Naturalist
- Spouse: Laura Mattacodi (m. 1695)
- Parent(s): Lorenzo Vallisneri and Lucrezia Vallisneri (née Dacini)

Academic background
- Education: University of Bologna
- Academic advisor: Marcello Malpighi

Academic work
- Era: Scientific Revolution
- Institutions: University of Padua
- Notable students: Carlo Francesco Cogrossi

Signature
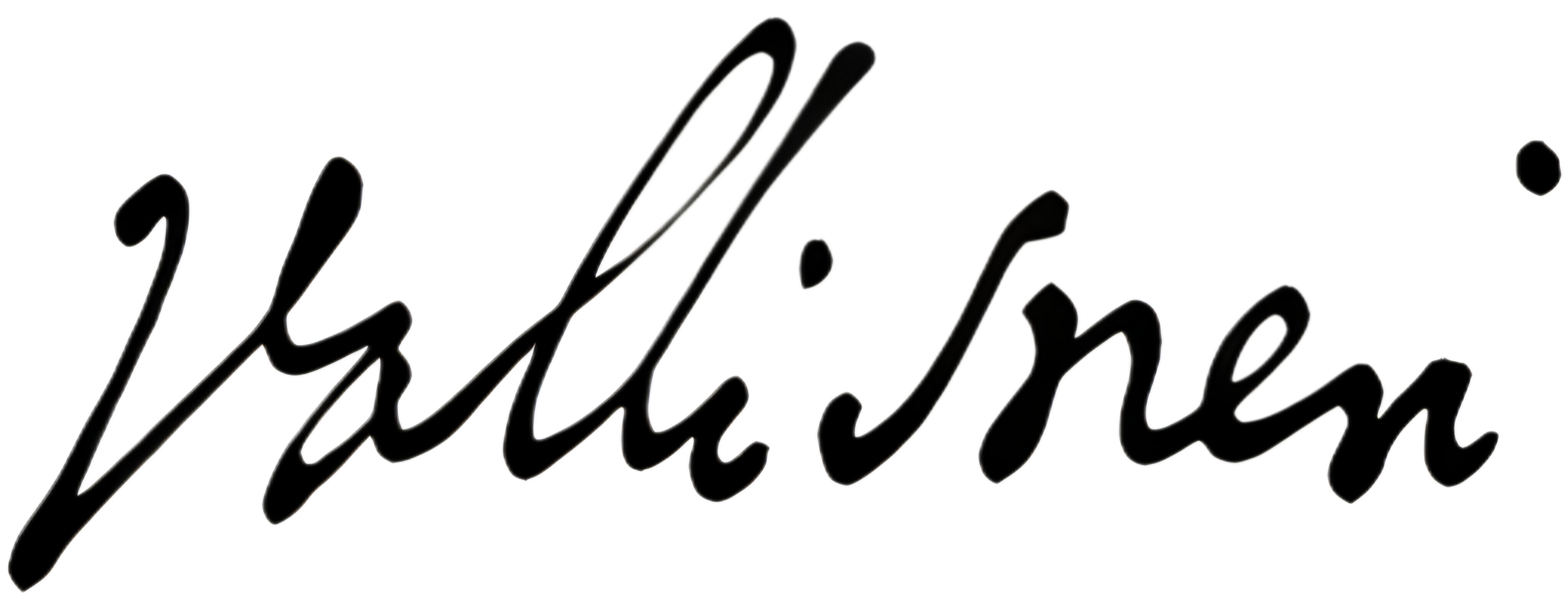

Antonio Vallisneri FRS (3 May 1661 – 18 January 1730), also rendered as Antonio Vallisnieri, was an Italian medical scientist, physician and naturalist. He played a significant role in the early history of both biology and anatomy. Vallisneri is regarded as one of the fathers of modern geology and his work was highly valued by Charles Lyell.

== Life ==
=== Early life and education ===
Vallisneri was born at Trassilico in the duchy of Modena on 3 May 1661. His father, Lorenzo Vallisneri, a doctor of laws, was governor of the district of Garfagnana; his mother was Maria Lucrezia Dacini. A grand-uncle was the physician Cesare Magati. After preliminary schooling in Scandiano, Modena, and Reggio, in 1682 he went to Bologna, where he studied medicine under the guidance of Marcello Malpighi. In 1683, Vallisneri was elected prior of the students at Bologna. He remained there through 1684, gaining practical experience under the guidance of Paolo Salani, whom Malpighi, since he was himself seeing few if any patients, recommended as a suitable mentor. It is remarkable that although Vallisneri admired the learning of Malpighi's adversary, Giovanni Girolamo Sbaraglia, whose lectures he often attended, his relations with Malpighi remained most cordial, his attitude reverential.

=== Career ===
In 1685, Vallisneri was obliged by ducal decree to return to Reggio to obtain the doctorate in philosophy and medicine. In 1692, he married Laura Mattacodi. In 1695, he became medico condotto of Luzzara and held this post until 1698, when he accepted a similar one at Castelnovo di Sotto. In 1700, he was called to the University of Padua as lecturer on practical medicine, the beginning of his career of thirty years as a lecturer on medicine there.

Meanwhile, in the midst of a busy practice, Vallisneri had begun the observations and experiments that resulted in his first extensive publication, his Dialoghi sopra la curiosa origine di molti insetti, which appeared at Venice in 1700. In 1696 and 1697, brief summaries from a manuscript of it had been published in the scientific journal Galleria di Minerva (I, 245; II, 293-296, 353-355). The work, devoted to the thesis that insects arise from eggs laid by females of the same species, is a tribute to the author's revered master, presented as it is in the form of a dialogue between Malpighi and Pliny.

Vallisneri worked in biology, botany, veterinary medicine, hydrology and the newly born science geology. In the years of his tenure at the university, he made many contributions to the Galleria di Minerva, and, after its demise, to the Giornale dei Letterati d'Italia, two literary and academic journals published in Venice. He also wrote a number of books on reproduction and the generation of life (especially insects), natural history, and curious objects that came to his attention.

Vallisneri's work attracted the attention of scholars both inside and outside of Italy; Giacinto Gimma, Giovanni Battista Morgagni, Louis Bourguet, Nicolas Andry, and many others were aware of Vallisneri's work, even if they disagreed with his conclusions. Along with his colleagues Giovanni Morgagni and Domenico Guglielmini, Vallisneri helped Padua overtake Bologna as the premier location for experimental philosophy in Italy, especially in the fields of medicine and the natural sciences.

Vallisneri died in Padua in 1730. He was buried in Santa Caterina d'Alessandria. In 1733, Vallisneri's son, Antonio Junior, donated his father's collection of natural finds and scientific instruments to the University of Padua.

== Importance ==
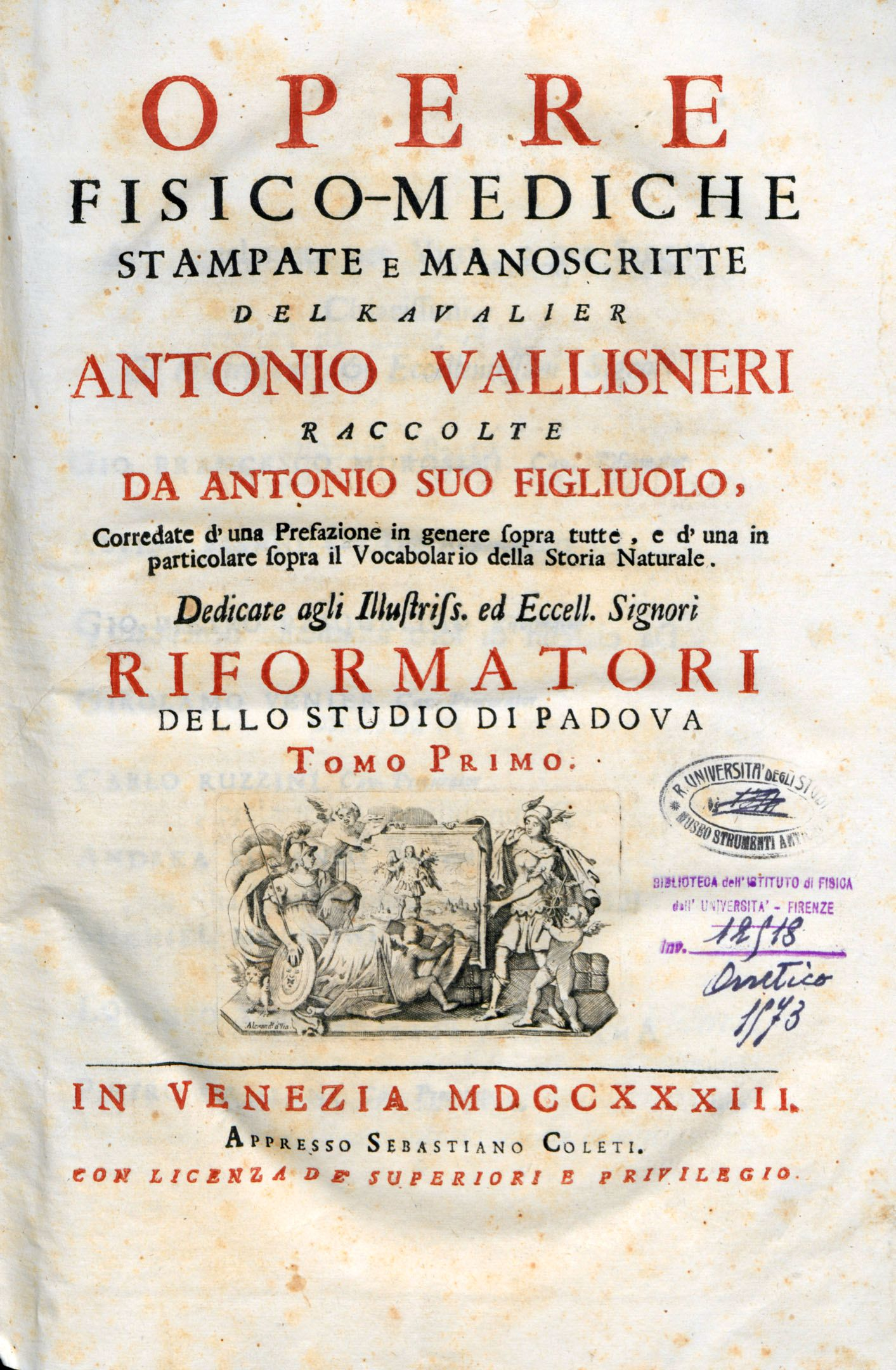
Opere fisico-mediche, 1733

Vallisneri belonged to the Galilean school of experimental scientists and was deeply influenced by rationalist thinkers such as Leibniz and Conti. He is known for being one of the first researchers in medicine to have proposed abandoning the Aristotelian theories for an experimental approach based on the scientific principles suggested by Galileo Galilei. Vallisneri stated that scientific knowledge is best acquired through experience and reasoning. This principle was followed in his anatomical dissections and carefully drawn descriptions of insects. For this reason, his medical career was at the centre of heated controversy, as many of his contemporaries could not abandon prevailing medieval theories, even in the face of glaring experimental evidence.

Vallisneri was keenly interested in the natural sciences, and over his lifetime collected numerous specimens of animals, minerals and other natural objects. Particularly notable are his contributions to geology. In his treatise De' Corpi Marini (1721), Vallisneri challenged the popular theory that the Universal Deluge was the origin of all known fossil specimens. He summarised the main diluvial theories and rejected them. He proposed a theory involving multiple localised floods and emergences to explain fossil distribution, and restricted the direct action of God to the biblical deluge. Vallisneri's geological theories deeply influenced Anton Moro, the father of plutonism.

Vallisneri wrote in a direct and precise style. In 1709, he joined Francesco Scipione Maffei and Apostolo Zeno to edit a literary journal, Giornale de' Letterati d'Italia. As editor of the medical and naturalistic sections of this journal, he used the platform to promote Galilean experimental legacy in Italy and all over Europe. Vallisneri's contribution to the use of language makes him one of the most admired science writers, in the tradition of Galilei, Francesco Redi and Lorenzo Magalotti. Vallisneri also followed Galilei's tracks in electing Italian as the language of choice for writing his treatises rather than Latin which was considered the “language of knowledge” in that era.

== Works ==
- Antonio Vallisnieri (1721), Istoria della generazione dell'uomo, e degli animali, se sia da' vermicelli spermatici, o dalle uova, Venice: Appresso Giovanni Gabbriel Hertz, OL 2668866M
- Antonio Vallisnieri (1726), Lezione accademica intorno l'origine delle fontane, Venice: Appresso Pietro Poletti, all'Eloquenza in Merceria di S. Salvatore, OCLC 23450508, OL 24980319M
- Antonio Vallisnieri (1728), De' corpi marini che su' Monti si trovano; della loro origine, e dello stato del mondo avanti il Diluvio, nel Diluvio, e dopo il Diluvio: Lettere Critiche. (2nd edition, first published 1721, On Marine (fossil) Life to be Found on Mountains ed.), Venice: Domenico Lovisa
- Vallisneri, Antonio (1733). Opere fisico-mediche (in Italian). Vol. 1. Venezia: Sebastiano Coleti.

Title	Year	Description
Perennial Springs	1715	On the origin of rivers, based on an exploration in the Tuscan-Emilian Apennine chain
Dialoghi sopra la curiosa origine di molti Insetti	1700	"Dialogues on the curious origin of several insects"

== Legacy ==
The freshwater plant genus Vallisneria commemorates him.

== Bibliography ==
- Montalenti, Giuseppe (1970). "Vallisnieri (or Vallisneri), Antonio". In Charles Coulston Gillispie (ed.). Dictionary of Scientific Biography. Vol. 13. New York: Charles Scribner's Sons. pp. 562–5.
- Generali, Dario (2013). "Vallisneri, Antonio". Il Contributo italiano alla storia del Pensiero: Scienze. Rome: Istituto dell'Enciclopedia Italiana.
- Barnett, Lydia (2015). "Strategies of Toleration: Talking Across Confessions in the Alpine Republic of Letters". Eighteenth-Century Studies. 48 (2): 141–157. JSTOR 24690323.
- Generali, Dario (2020). "VALLISNERI, Antonio". Dizionario Biografico degli Italiani (in Italian). Vol. 98: Valeriani–Verra. Rome: Istituto dell'Enciclopedia Italiana. ISBN 978-88-12-00032-6.
- Luzzini, Francesco (2022). "(Re-)Shaping a Method: Field Research and Experimental Legacy in Vallisneri's Primi Itineris Specimen (1705)". In Simona Boscani Leoni; Sarah Baumgartner; Meike Knittel (eds.). Connecting Territories: Exploring People and Nature, 1700–1850. Leiden and Boston: Brill. pp. 54–74. ISBN 978-90-04-41246-0. JSTOR 10.1163/j.ctv2gjwn16.7.
