= The Beaneater =

Painting by Annibale Carracci

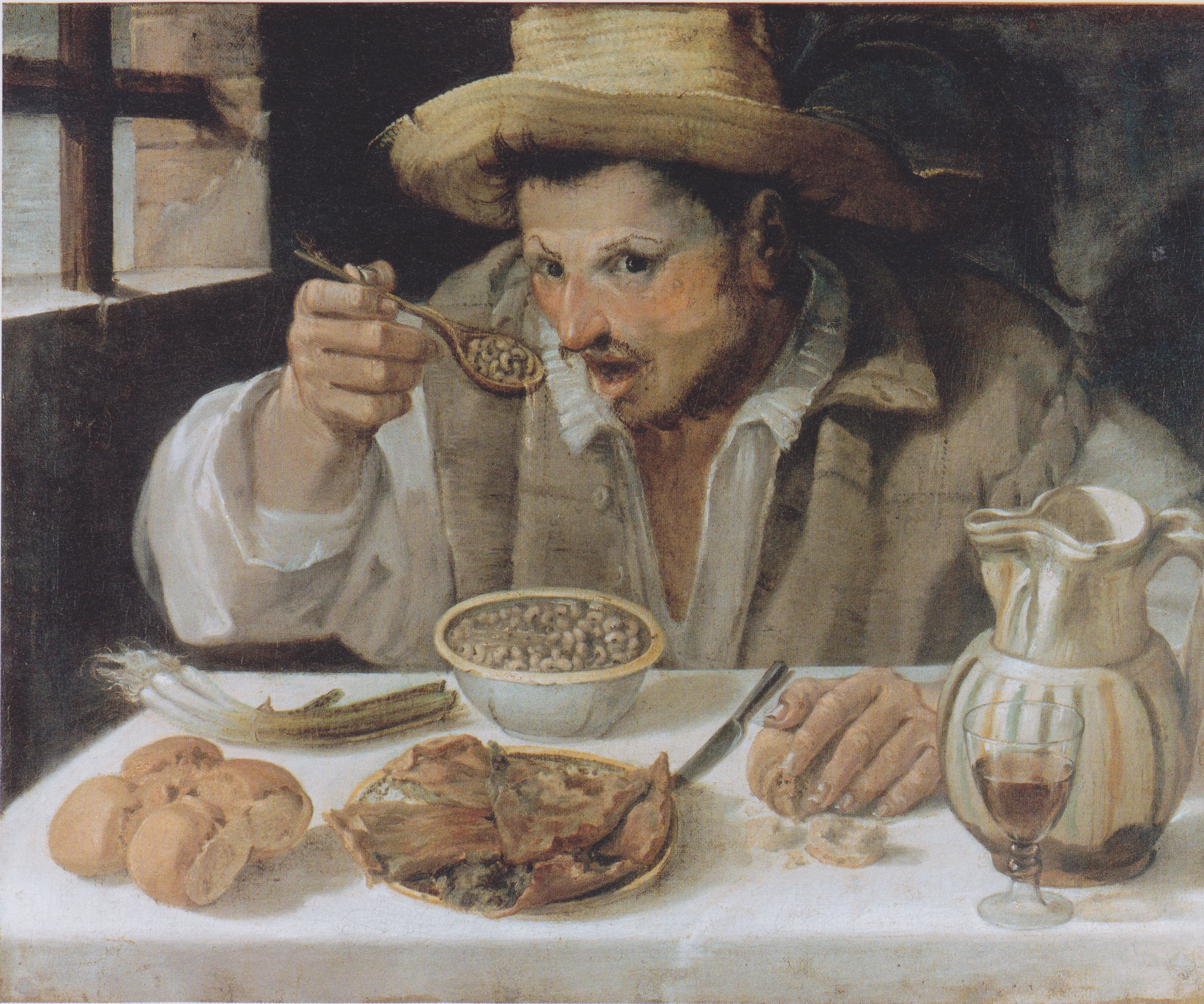
- Artist: Annibale Carracci
- Year: 1580–1590
- Medium: Oil on canvas
- Dimensions: 57 cm × 68 cm (22 in × 27 in)
- Location: Palazzo Colonna; Rome

The Beaneater (Italian: Mangiafagioli) is a painting by the Italian Baroque painter Annibale Carracci. Dating from 1580 to 1590 (probably 1583–1584), it is housed in the gallery of Palazzo Colonna of Rome.

== Description ==
A peasant or laborer eats at a table with a wooden spoon. He eats white beans from a bowl. On the table is a spread of food: onions, bread, a vegetable pie, a half-empty glass of wine, and an earthenware jug decorated with bright stripes. This painting is a synthesis of a still life and portrait combined, uncommon during this artistic period.

== Analysis ==
The painting is connected to the contemporary Butcher's Shop (now at Oxford), for it shares the same depiction of everyday people. Painted in Bologna, it is a broadly and realistically painted still life, which owes much to Flanders and Holland.

Carracci was also influenced in the depiction of everyday life subjects by Vincenzo Campi and Bartolomeo Passarotti. Manifest is Carracci's capability to adapt his style, making it "lower" when concerning "lower" subjects like the Mangiafagioli, while in his more academic works (such as the broadly contemporary Assumption of the Virgin) he was able to use a more classicist composure with the same ease.

== Elsewhere ==
- Page at artonline.it (in Italian)
