= Magati =

Magati could refer to:

- Cesare Magati (1579-1647), Italian physician
- An alternative name for the language Persian Romani
- The Australian language Magati Ke
- A village at the base of the Usambara Mountains
