= Carlo Fracassati =

Italian anatomist (c. 1630–1672)

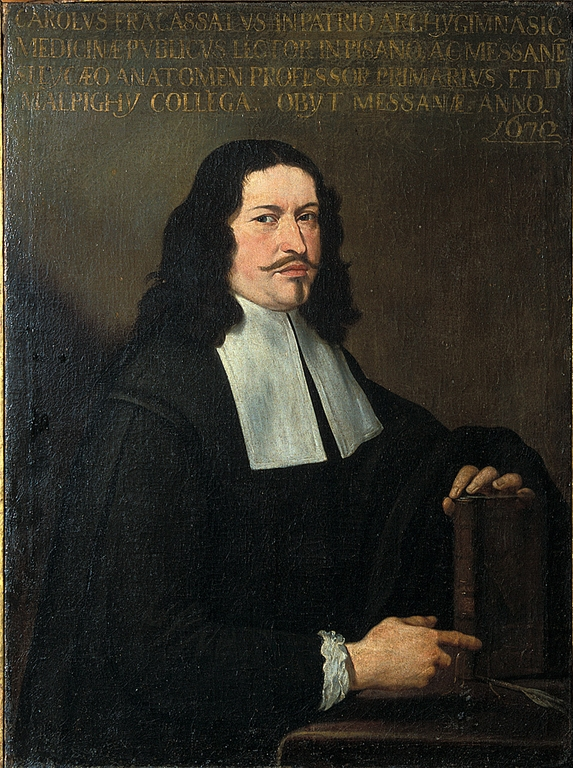
- Portrait from the Museo di San Domenico, Bologna
- Born: c. 1630; Bologna, Papal States
- Died: 12 October 1672 (aged 41–42); Messina, Kingdom of Sicily
- Education: University of Bologna
- Scientific career
- Fields: Medicine, anatomy
- Workplaces: University of Bologna; University of Pisa

Carlo Fracassati Latinized as Carolus Fracassatus (c. 1630 – 12 October 1672) was an Italian anatomist and professor. He was a colleague and collaborator of Marcello Malphigi.

== Life and work ==
Fracassati was born in Bologna in a family that came from Budrio. He joined university where his contemporaries included Marcello Malphigi, Giambattista Capponi and C. Golfieri. As a student of Bartolomeo Massari, he was part of a circle of nine anatomists called the "chorus anatomicus" who met regularly at the home of the professor. They conducted dissections and vivisection experiments on animals. One of the experiments they conducted was on the circulation of blood. These meetings ended when Massari died in 1655. He graduated in philosophy and medicine in 1656 and then taught logic for three years. He then taught medical theory at Bologna from 1659 and worked under the chair of surgery from 1660 and taught medical practice from 1662 to 1664. He published Hecatombe physioiatrica in 1656 and Praelectio medica in 1659. In 1663 he moved to Pisa but continued to work with colleagues in Bologna. At Pisa he worked with Giovanni Borelli, Lorenzo Bellini, Nicolas Steno and others. Among the work was on the papillary structures in the tongue involved in taste sensation. In 1670 he went to teach at the University of Messina where he died two years later.

== Bibliography ==
- Belloni Speciale, Gabriella (1997). "FRACASSATI, Carlo". Dizionario Biografico degli Italiani (in Italian). Vol. 49: Forino–Francesco da Serino. Rome: Istituto dell'Enciclopedia Italiana. ISBN 978-88-12-00032-6.
