= Enrico Alleva =

Italian ethologist (born 1953)

- Born: 16 August 1953 (age 72); Rome, Italy
- Education: Sapienza University of Rome
- Scientific career
- Fields: Ethology, neurosciences, biology

Enrico Alleva (born 16 August 1953 in Rome, Italy) is an Italian ethologist. He has been president of the Società Italiana di Etologia (Italian Ethological Society) since 2008.

After obtaining his degree in biological sciences at the Sapienza University of Rome (1975) with geneticist Giuseppe Montalenti, Alleva specialized in animal behaviour at the Scuola Normale Superiore di Pisa (tutored by Floriano Papi). Alleva is a member of the scientific councils of Agenzia per la protezione dell'ambiente e per i servizi tecnici, World Wide Fund for Nature, Legambiente, Stazione Zoologica Anton Dohrn, Istituto della Enciclopedia Italiana "Giovanni Treccani", Italian Space Agency, CNR Department "Scienze della vita", and the Commissione Antartide. He is a corresponding member of the Accademia dei Lincei, Accademia Medica di Roma, and the Academy of Sciences of the Institute of Bologna. Alleva was awarded the "G. B. Grassi" prize of the Accademia dei Lincei and the Anokhin Medal of the Russian Academy of Medical Sciences.

From 1990 until 2017 Alleva was the director of the Section of Behavioural Neurosciences of the Istituto Superiore di Sanità (Rome), from 2017 to 2018 he directed the Reference Centre for Behavioural Sciences and Mental Health (Istituto Superiore di Sanità). The Web of Science lists over 300 articles in peer-reviewed journals . He is the editor-in-chief of the Annali dell'Istituto Superiore di Sanità. From 2022 he is the Vicepresident of the (Italian) Consiglio Superiore di Sanità.

Alleva is also a well known scientific populariser, who has written Il tacchino termostatico (Theoria, 1990), Consigli a un giovane etologo (Theoria, 1994, with Nicoletta Tiliacos), and La mente animale (Einaudi, 2008) and is often invited to radio and television shows.
