= Butcher's Shop =

Paintings by Annibale Carracci, c.1583

The Butcher's Shop
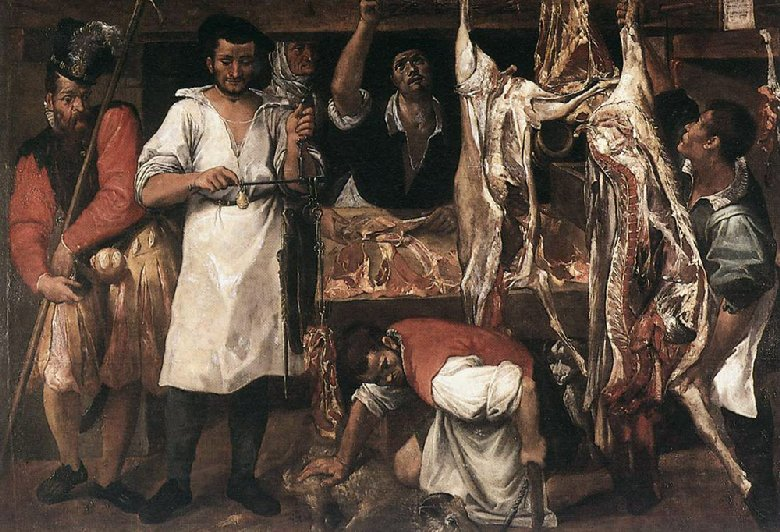
- Artist: Annibale Carracci
- Year: c. 1583
- Medium: Oil on canvas
- Dimensions: 185 cm × 266 cm (73 in × 105 in)
- Location: Christ Church Picture Gallery, Oxford

Butcher's Shop is the title of two paintings by the Italian Baroque painter Annibale Carracci, both dating from the early 1580s. They are now in the collections of Christ Church Picture Gallery, Oxford, and the Kimbell Art Museum in Fort Worth, Texas.

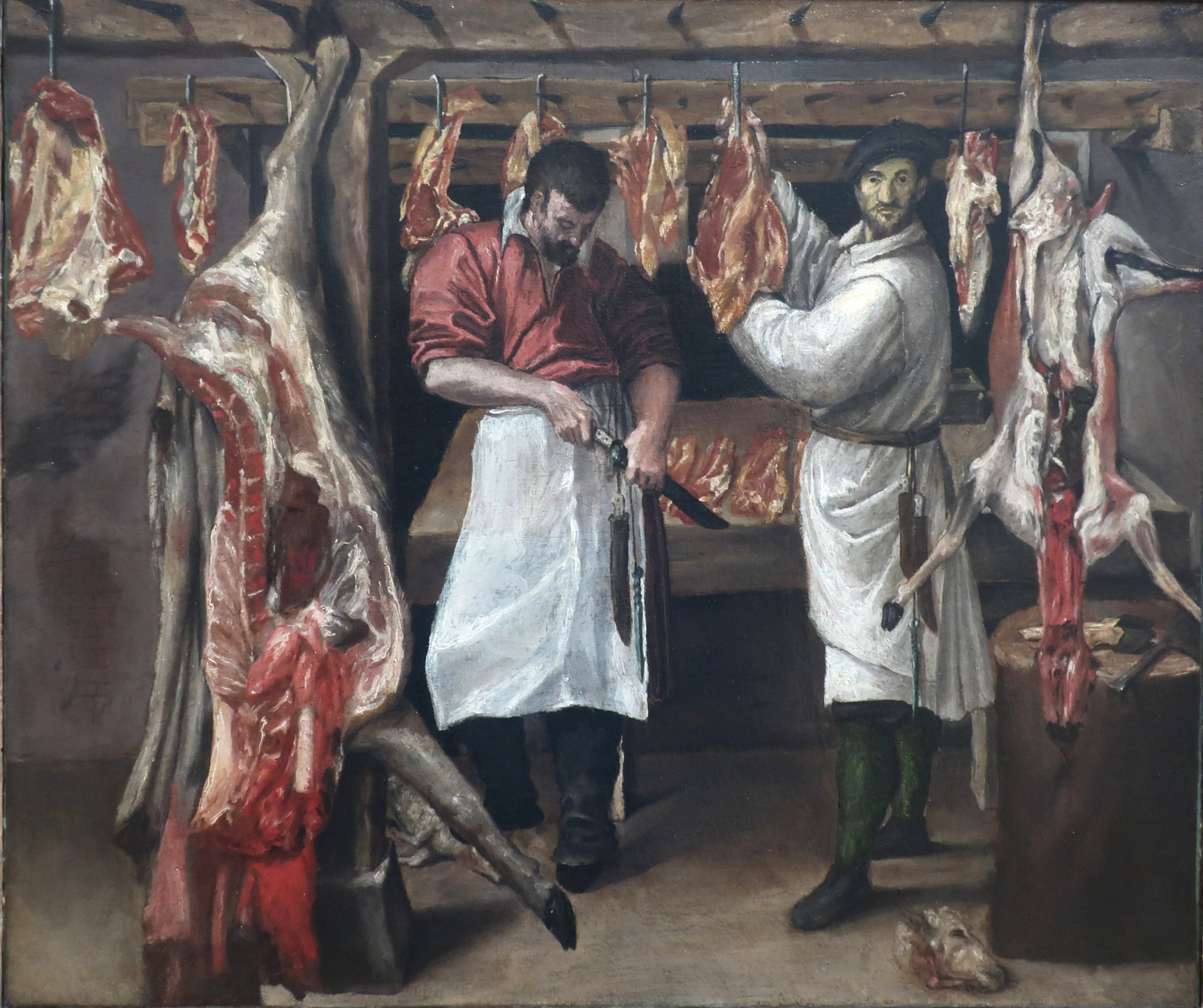
Annibale Carracci, The Butcher's Shop, early 1580s, Kimbell Art Museum, 23 1/2 × 27 15/16 in. (59.7 × 71 cm)

The paintings are connected to the contemporary Beaneater (Galleria Colonna), as they are very early examples of Italian genre painting. The large size of the Christ Church painting is exceptional for such a subject at this date, and it has been suggested they were commissioned by a butcher's guild, or for use as a sign. Carracci was influenced in his depiction of everyday life subjects by Vincenzo Campi and Bartolomeo Passarotti, whom the Butcher's Shop was originally attributed to. Carracci's ability to adapt his style is demonstrated, making it "lower" when concerning "lower", quasi-satirical subjects like the Mangiafagioli and the Butcher's Shop, while in his more academic works (such as the roughly contemporary Assumption of the Virgin) he was able to use a more finished manner with the same ease.

Significant alterations to some figures are revealed by X-rays, and the hand on the edge of the table, now apparently belonging to the old woman, though not in proportion with the rest of her, may have originally belonged to the butcher to the right of her.

The Christ Church painting was in the collections of the Gonzaga Dukes of Mantua and Charles I of England; after reaching Christ Church it was hung for a long time in the college kitchen, before being recognised for what it was in the 20th century.
