= Bartolomeo Massari =

Italian painter, astrological doctor, and anatomist (c. 1596–1655)

Bartolomeo Massari (c. 1596 – 18 February 1655) was an Italian painter turned astrological doctor and anatomist. He was the tutor of Marcello Malphigi and Carlo Fracassati.

Massari was born in Bologna the son of the artist Lucio Massari (1569–1633). He took an interest in art at a young age but was told that making a living from art was difficult. A painting that he made in the Church of St. Martino Maggiore in Bologna in 1625 is titled "St. Martin and the poor man". He became an astrological doctor, prescribing based on horoscopes and then headed the Accademia de Notomia, a private academy in Bologna where he built up a group of nine students known as the 'Coro anatomico' ("anatomical choir") in 1650 who met and conducted anatomical studies. This group included Marcello Malphigi and Carlo Fracassati. They dissected bodies and made vivisection experiments on animals. His daughter Francesca married Marcello Malphigi but died shortly after.

Massari died in Bologna and was buried in the church of St. Tommaso del Mercato which no longer exists.
