= Lucio Massari =

Italian painter (1569–1633)

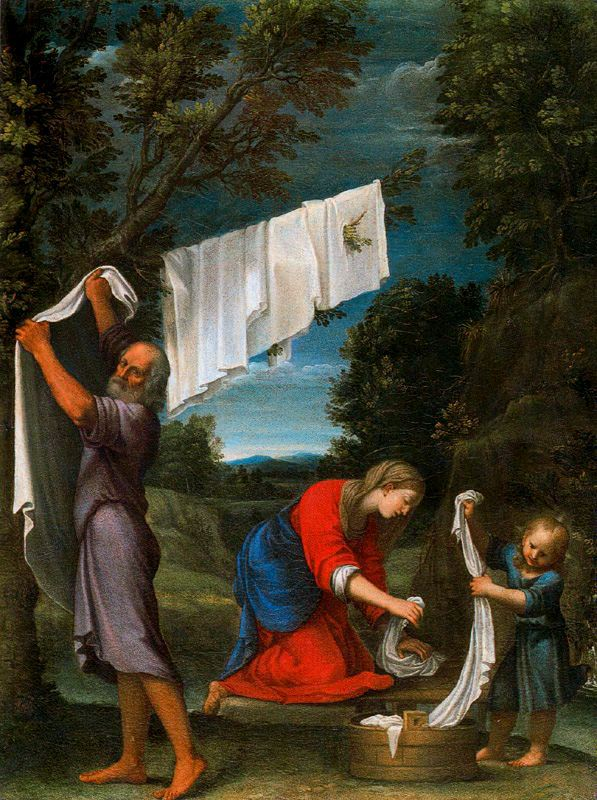
- The Holy Family
- Born: 22 January 1569; Bologna
- Died: 3 November 1633 (aged 64)
- Known for: Painting
- Movement: Mannerism and Baroque

Lucio Massari (22 January 1569 – 3 November 1633) was an Italian painter of the School of Bologna. He was active during the Mannerist and early-Baroque periods.

== Life and work ==
Massari was born in Bologna, where he initially apprenticed with an unknown painter by the name of Spinelli, the Mannerist painter Bartolomeo Passarotti, but also worked with Bartolomeo Cesi. In 1592, he joined the Carracci studio or the Academy of the Incamminati, and remained attached to Ludovico Carracci for many years. In 1604, he worked with Ludovico to fresco Stories of San Mauro, San Benedetto and others in the cloister of San Michele in Bosco. In 1607, he collaborated with Lionello Spada and Francesco Brizio in frescoes for the Palazzo Bonfioli, in Bologna. In 1610, he visited Rome, remaining under the patronage of Cardinal Facchinetti, and befriended Domenichino. In 1612, he completed the frescoes left unfinished by Bernardino Poccetti in a chapel of the Certosa di Galluzzo, near Florence. He painted the main altarpiece for the church of Santa Maria in Guadi in San Giovanni in Persiceto.

He returned to Bologna in 1614, and soon traveled with Francesco Albani to work in Mantua. He is said to have spent so much time in hunting, fishing, and the delights of the countryside, that he neglected painting, though his biography shows him to be exceedingly prolific in altarpieces. Among his pupils were Sebastiano Brunetti, Antonio Randa, and Fra Bonaventura Bisi.

His son Bartolomeo Massari became a noted anatomist.
