= Sebastiano Brunetti =

Italian painter

- Born: Bologna
- Died: 1649
- Education: Lucio Massari, Guido Reni

Sebastiano Brunetti (died 1649) was an Italian painter active in his native Bologna. He first trained with Lucio Massari, then Guido Reni. He painted a Guardian Angel for the church of Santa Maria Maggiore at Bologna, and a Holy Family for the church of San Giuseppe Sposo, and for Santa Margherita, a Mary Magdalen praying in the Desert.

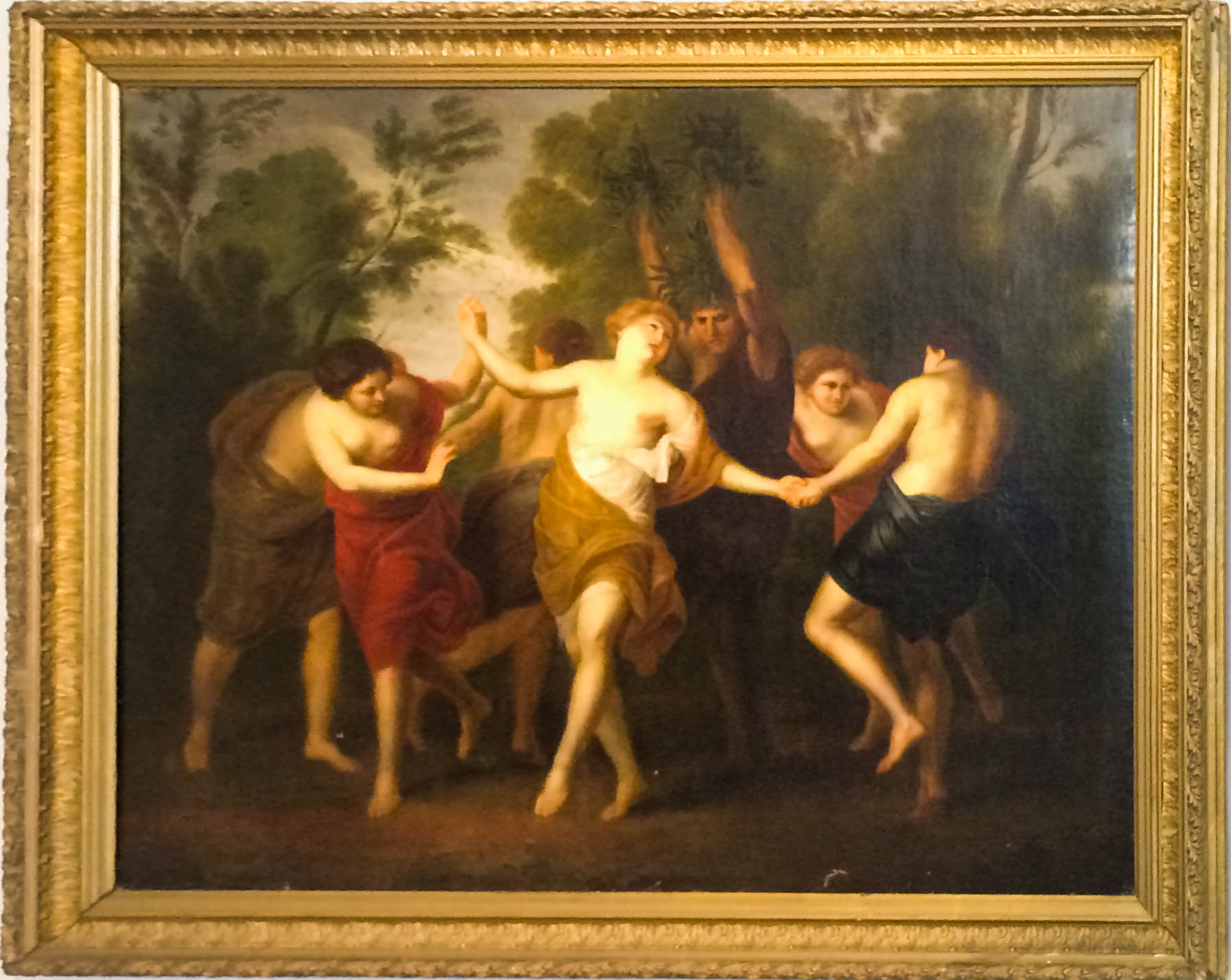
Vacchanalia, painted by Sebastiano Brunetti in the 17th century
