= Giovanni Girolamo Sbaraglia =

Italian physician and writer (1641–1710)

Doctor of Medicine Giovanni Girolamo Sbaraglia
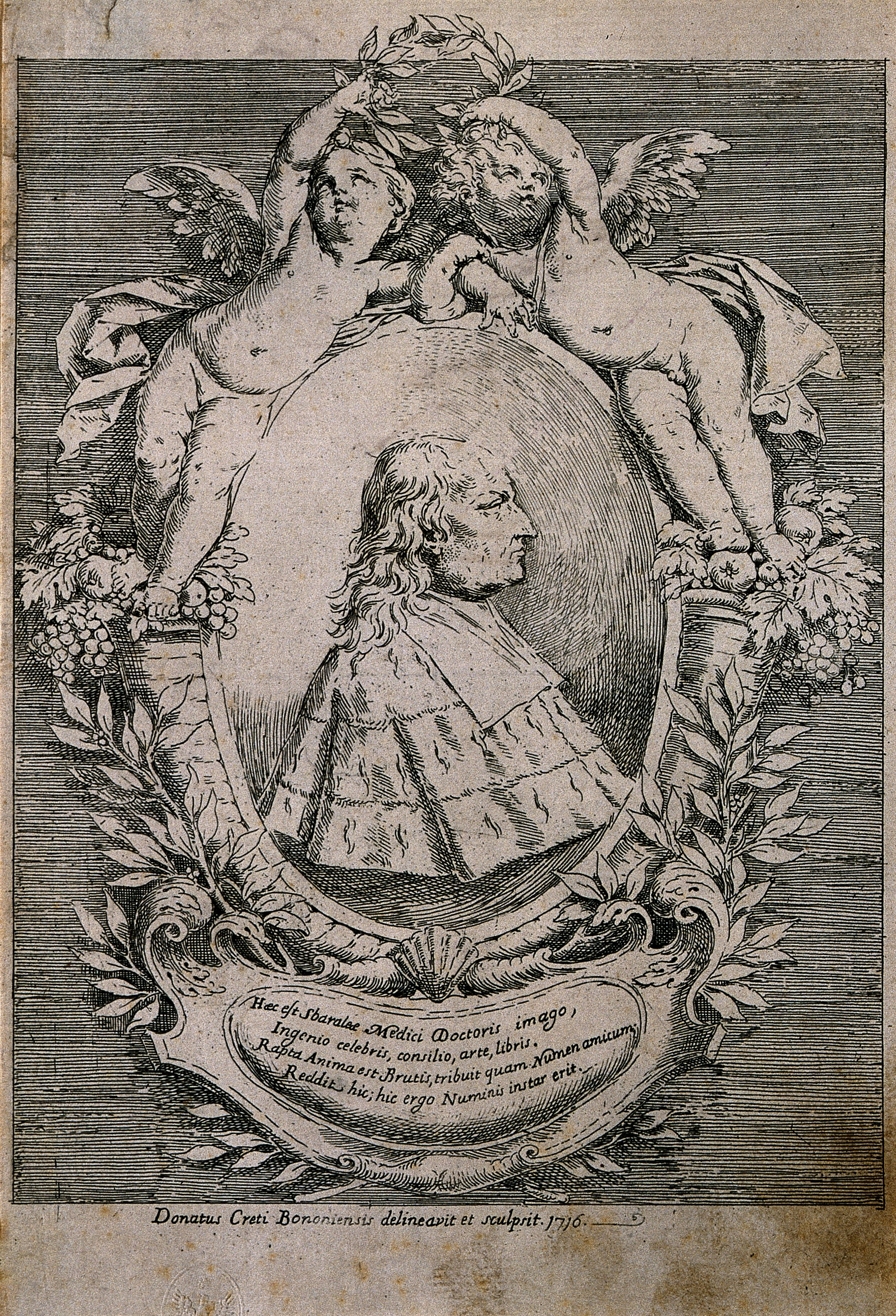
- Posthumous etching depicting Sbaraglia by Donato Creti
- Born: October 28, 1641; Bologna, Papal States
- Died: June 1710 (aged 68); Bologna, Papal States
- Occupation: Physician
- Known for: Criticism of the work of Marcello Malpighi
- Parent(s): Girolamo Sbaraglia and Bartolomea Sbaraglia (née Giuliani)

Academic background
- Education: University of Bologna
- Influences: Galen; Giovanni Agostino Cucchi

Academic work
- Institutions: University of Bologna
- Notable students: Antonio Vallisneri

Giovanni Girolamo Sbaraglia (28 October 1641 – June 1710) was an Italian physician and writer. He was a determined critic of the famous anatomist Marcello Malpighi.

== Biography ==
He was born in Bologna, and obtained a doctorate in philosophy and medicine at the University of Bologna. He gained academic positions, teaching both logic and practical medicine, and later theoretic medicine, at the university. He taught at the latter position for nearly four decades. He became a much revered clinical physician in Bologna, and was the main doctor for the Jesuit and Dominican orders in Bologna.

While he lived mainly in Bologna, his family had an estate in Crevalcore that bordered with the Malpighi property in that town. On December 14, 1659, the brother of Giovanni, Tommaso Sbaraglia, entered into an argument with the brother of Marcello Malpighi. In the course of the argument, Malpighi slayed Tommaso.

However Giovanni Sbaraglia's opposition to Malpighi was also a reactionary refusal to entertain the new methods and studies that were informing anatomy, physiology, and medicine, including the use of microscopes and the comparative study of plants and animals, specially the use of the latter in physiology studies. He published his main attack in a Latin text published pseudonymously: De recentiorum medicorum studio dissertatio epistolaris ad amicum (Göttingen, 1684). Sbaraglia argued that animal models or the microanatomic information did little to advance practical medicine, which he stated was more properly derived from classic sources such as Galen and direct clinical experience.

The dispute with Malpighi was harsh, and Malpighi, while also holding an appointment at the University of Bologna, faced opposition in obtaining the professorship of Anatomy at the University of Bologna. Sbaraglia continued his attacks on the Malphighian ideas in De vivipara generatione scepsis (Bologna 1696) and Oculorum et mentis vigiliae (Bologna 1704). In Bologna, others that supported Sbaraglia included Paolo Mini, Giovanni Battista Trionfetti, and Felice Marsigli. But Malpighi also had his prominent protectors including Bartolomeo Massari, professor of medicine at the university, and the cardinal Antonio Pignatelli, the future Pope Innocent XII. In the late 1650s, Malpighi accepted an offer to be a professor of Theoretical Medicine at the University of Pisa. Ultimately in the 18th-century, the students favored the line of study of Malpighi.

A monument to Sbaraglia is found in the Archiginnasio of the university, not far from the monument to Malpighi.

== Sources ==
- Bresadola, Marco (2018). "SBARAGLIA, Giovanni Girolamo". Dizionario Biografico degli Italiani (in Italian). Vol. 91: Savoia–Semeria. Rome: Istituto dell'Enciclopedia Italiana. ISBN 978-88-12-00032-6.
