= Carlo Francesco Cogrossi =

Italian physician (1682–1769)

Carlo Francesco Cogrossi (5 July 1682 – 13 January 1769) was an Italian physician who was among the first to suggest the theory of contagium vivum that minute invisible parasitic living organisms were a cause of disease. His suggestion was based on his examination of a rinderpest epidemic which he published in a letter Nuova idea del male contagioso dei buoi (New theory of the contagious disease of the oxen) published in 1714.

== Biography ==
Cogrossi was born in Crema, son of Marcantonio of Caravaggio, and studied medicine at the University of Padua where he was influenced by Domenico Guglielmini. After graduating in 1701 he practiced for a while in Padua while also studying under Bernardino Ramazzini and Antonio Vallisneri and then in Venice before returning to Crema in 1710. While in Venice he was part of a group called the Accademia degli Spassionato. He went to Padua University to teach medicine in 1720 and succeeded Antonio Vallisneri in 1730. Poor health forced him to return to Crema in 1733.

Cogrossi's most noted contribution was his Nuova idea del male contagioso dei buoi which was communicated to Antonio Vallisneri who agreed on the idea of contagium vivum. He had been influenced by microscopic examinations, historical knowledge of mange and mites involved which made him suggest that there might be smaller parasites that could cause disease. Vallisneri however did not accept living microbes as a sole cause of the rinderpest and also suggested that there were poisonous substances or toxins involved. Cogrossi also wrote De praxi medica promovenda (1714) dealing with medical theories and Nuova giunta al Trattato della china-china (1718) on the action of cinchona bark on blood.
