= Bartolomeo Passarotti =

Italian painter (1529–1592)

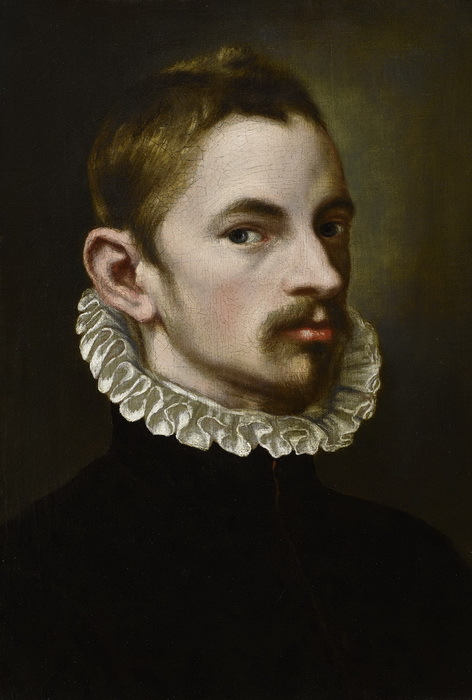
- Self-portrait (c. 1560)
- Born: 1529; Bologna
- Died: 1592 (aged 62–63)
- Known for: Painting
- Movement: Mannerism

Bartolomeo Passarotti or Passerotti (1529–1592) was an Italian painter of the mannerist period, who worked mainly in his native Bologna. His family name is also spelt Passerotti or Passarotto.

== Life and work ==
From approximately 1550 to 1555, he lived in Rome, where he worked under Giacomo Barozzi da Vignola and Taddeo Zuccari. Upon returning to Bologna, he established a large studio and, from 1564 to 1565, was engaged in painting a large altarpiece for the Basilica of San Giacomo Maggiore. In his later work, he turned to Tuscan models, such as Giorgio Vasari and Prospero Fontana. His last known work was The Presentation of Mary in the Temple, from 1583, now at the Pinacoteca Nazionale di Bologna.

He influenced many Bolognese who would later play a role in the rise of the Baroque. Annibale Carracci (whose brother Agostino studied with Passerotti) was influenced by Passerotti's genre scenes in a select set of paintings (such as The Beaneater and The Butcher's Shop, the latter being originally attributed to Passerotti). Lucio Massari and Francesco Brizzi were among his pupils. Three of Passerotti's sons, including Ventura (1566–1618), Aurelio (1560–1609) and Tiburzio, were painters.

== Selected works ==
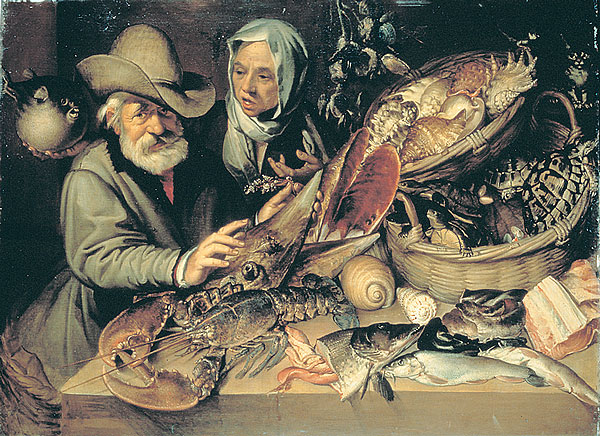
The Fish Stall

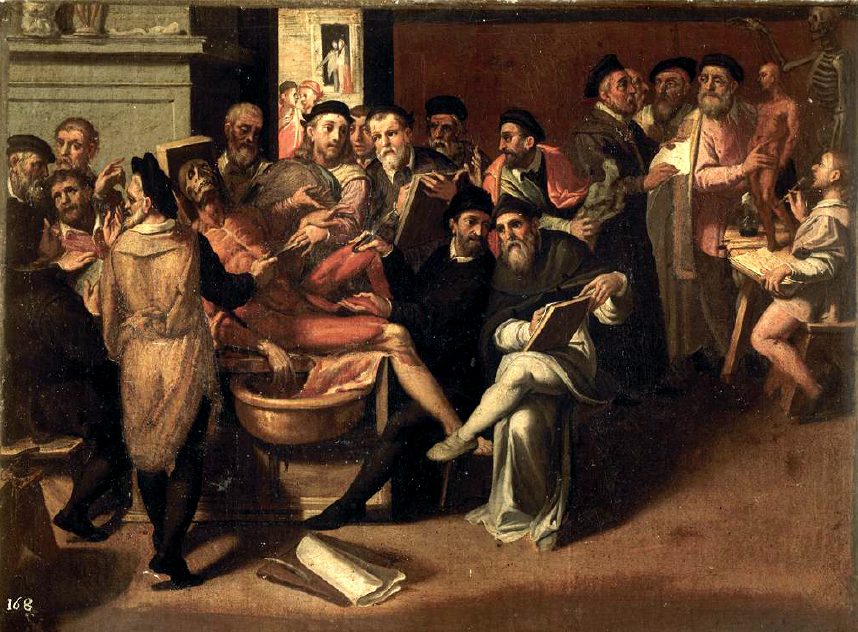
Anatomy Lesson

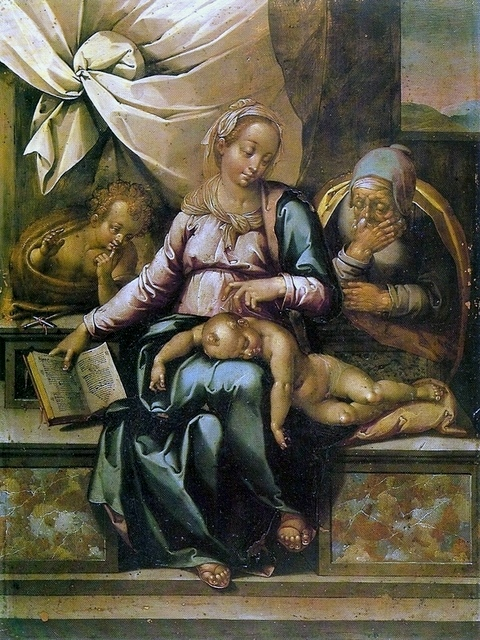
The Madonna of Silence

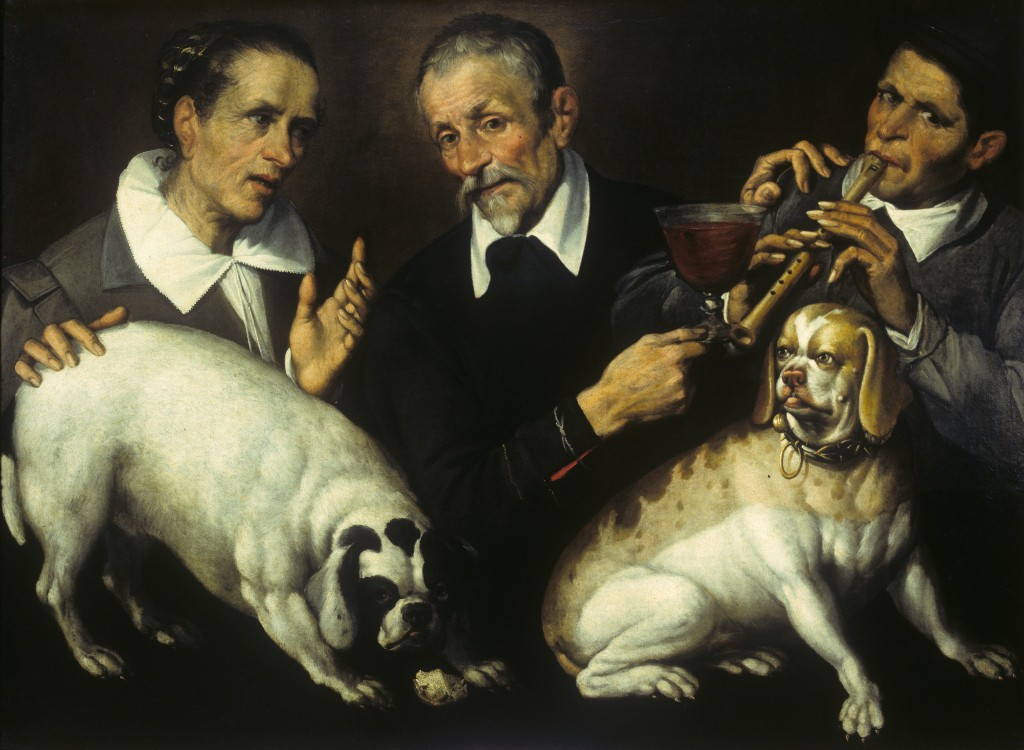
Three Men and Two Dogs, 1529

== Homer's Riddle ==
Homer's Riddle has a well-documented early history followed by centuries of obscurity. The painting was described in detail by Raffaello Borghini in 1584, who saw it in the collection of the Florentine scholar Giovanni Battista Deti. By 1677, it was recorded in the family palace of Senator Carlo Torrigiani, though the observer, Giovanni Cinelli Calvoli, misidentified the subject as Orpheus.

After this 17th-century sighting, all traces of the painting were lost, and it was marked as such in modern art historical studies.

The recent recovery was not a discovery at a public auction, but the result of dedicated scholarly research. The Uffizi Gallery successfully tracked down the painting to the descendants of the Torrigiani family, in whose possession it had remained, unrecognized, for centuries. The work was then acquired by the museum and, following its re-identification, is slated for display.

The story told in the painting is that of Homer inquiring of fishermen arriving on shore whether they had brought in a good catch, and the fishermen, "who had caught nothing and were busy delousing themselves", replied with a riddle: "What we caught, we threw away, what we didn't catch, we kept" (ὅσσ’ ἕλομεν λιπόμεσθ’, / ὅσσ’ ούχ ἔλομεν φερόμεσθα), in reference to the lice.

== Sources ==
- Angela Ghirardi, Bartolomeo Passerotti. Pittore (1529-1592) Catalogo generale, Rimini, Luisè Editore, 1990, ISBN 88-8505-053-0
- Angela Ghirardi, "PASSEROTTI, Bartolomeo", in, Dizionario biografico degli italiani, vol. 81, Roma, Istituto dell'Enciclopedia Italiana, 2014
- Corinna Höper, Bartolomeo Passarotti (1529-1592), 2 vols., Worms 1987
- Jürgen Müller, Das Geheimnis der unsichtbaren Schwelle. Bartolomeo Passerottis Allegra compagnia als Gemeinschaft von Toren, in: Kunstchronik 75/4 (2022), pp. 182–199, https://doi.org/10.11588/kc.2022.4.102832.
- Jürgen Müller, Der Künstler als komischer Held. Anmerkungen zur Genremalerei Bartolomeo Passerottis, in: Helen Boeßenecker, Gernot Mayer, Wolfgang Alberth (Eds.): Sinn und Sinnlichkeit in der Kunst. Festschrift für Roland Kanz, Petersberg 2023, pp. 36–47.
