= Tiburzio Passarotti =

Italian painter

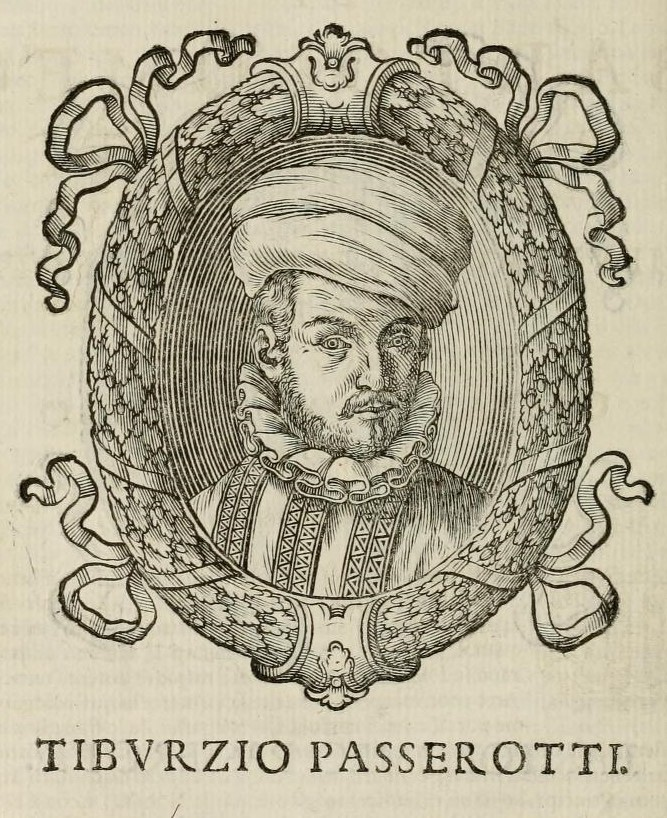

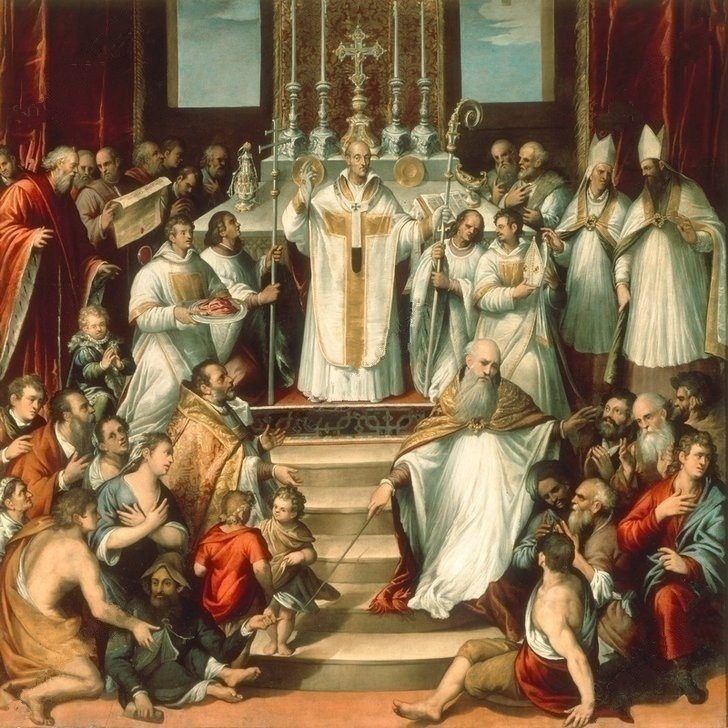
The Election of Giustiniani as Patriarch of Venice

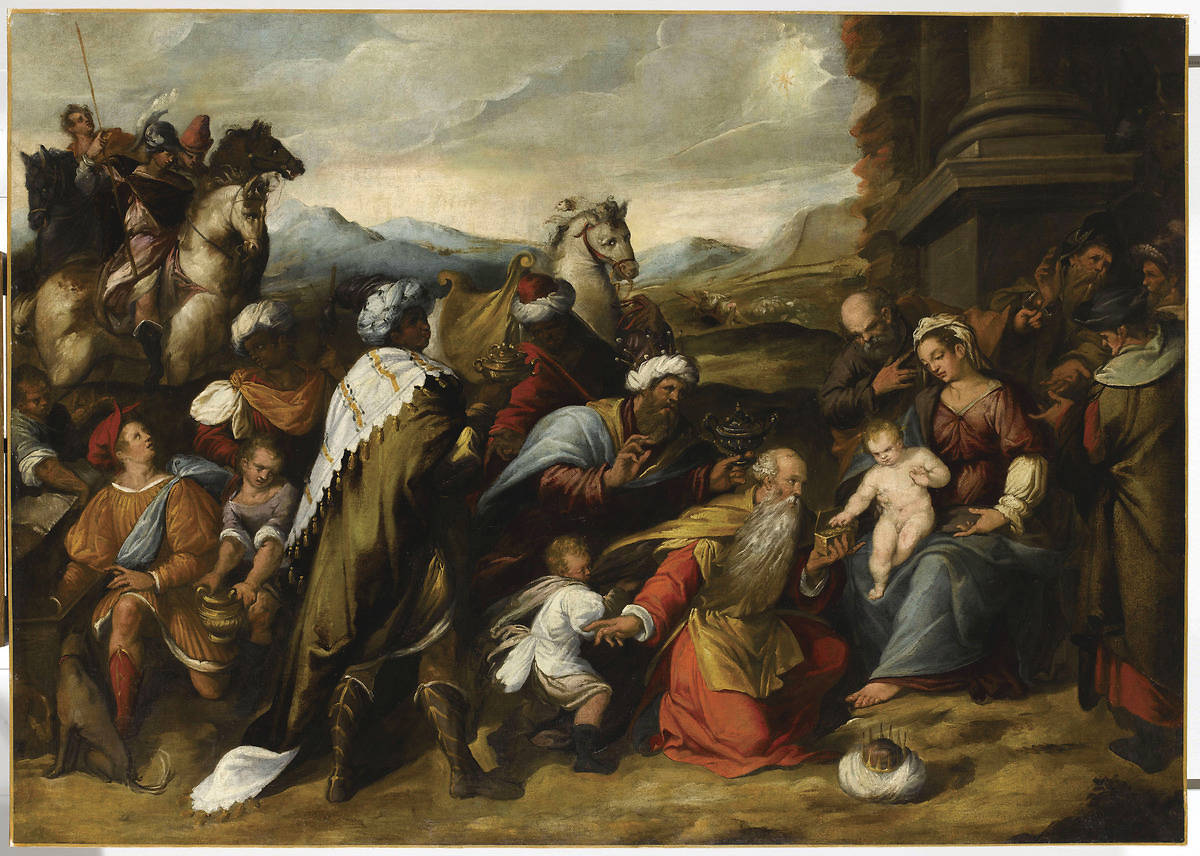
Adoration of the Magi

Tiburzio Passarotti or Passerotti (1553 – 22 November 1612) was an Italian painter, primarily of religious subjects.

== Biography ==
Passarotti was born in Bologna. He was the eldest son of the painter Bartolomeo Passarotti. At the age of eighteen, he joined the "Compagnia dei pittori" and, with the help of his father, participated in creating the altarpiece at the Basilica of San Giacomo Maggiore. At that time he was already moving away from a naturalistic style into mannerism. Shortly after, he left home to marry Taddea Gaggi, with whom he had two children, Gasparo and Arcangelo, who also became painters.

In 1580, he moved to Venice. There, in 1587, he was commissioned to paint a large canvas depicting the election of Lorenzo Giustiniani as the first Patriarch; now preserved at the Doge's Palace. He also engaged in other decorative work there, to repair damage that had been caused by two major fires in the 1570s. He also painted a "Last Supper", which is now at the Musei Civici di Padova, and a "Life of the Virgin", now at the Pinacoteca metropolitana di Bari.

He returned to Bologna in 1592, replacing his father on the governing board of the Compagnia dei pittori, where he also held the position of Steward from 1593 to 1603. During these years he executed numerous altarpieces; notably one showing the Madonna with Saints John the Evangelist and James at San Petronio Basilica.

He also painted a well known portrait of the surgeon, Gaspare Tagliacozzi, and a scene of the Crucifixion, with a kneeling Saint Francis. Several other works are in scattered places; an Adoration of the Magi (Ajaccio), an Annunciation (Cesena), and a Judith (Galleria Estense, Modena).

According to Malvasia, his first biographer, he was able to retire by selling a collection of drawings, by himself and his father, to Cardinal Benedetto Giustiniani, for what was then the immense sum of 6,000 lire. Passarotti died in Bologna on 22 November 1612.
