= Gaspare Tagliacozzi =

Italian surgeon (1545–1599)

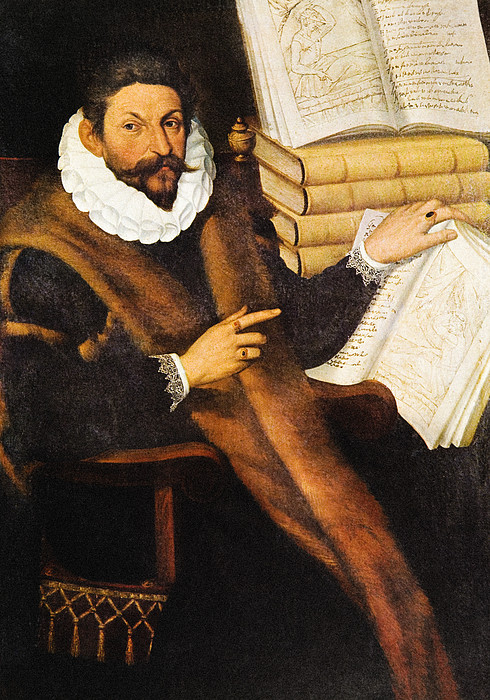
Gaspare Tagliacozzi; portrait by Tiburzio Passarotti

Gaspare Tagliacozzi (his last name has also been spelled Taliacotius, Tagliacoze or Tagliacozzio; Bologna, March 1545 – Bologna, 7 November 1599) was an Italian surgeon, pioneer of plastic and reconstructive surgery.

== Biography ==
Tagliacozzi was born in Bologna.

Tagliacozzi began his medical studies in 1565. He studied at the University of Bologna under Gerolamo Cardano for medicine, Ulisse Aldrovandi for natural sciences and Julius Caesar Aranzi for anatomy. At the age of twenty-four, he earned his degree in philosophy and medicine.

== Career ==
He was then appointed professor of surgery and later was appointed professor of anatomy. He taught at the Archiginnasio of Bologna. The amphitheater in which Tagliacozzi taught was severely damaged by American bombing during World War II. The theater was rebuilt and currently houses a wooden statue of Tagliacozzi. It is in this room that Tagliacozzi taught until 1595.

In 1568, two years before graduating, Tagliacozzi began practicing in the Hospital of Death, which was a sort of clinic for students since it was near the Archiginnasio. The hospital was run by a "Brotherhood of Death" whose job was to visit prisons and comfort those condemned to death. Through this brotherhood Tagliacozzi procured the bodies of executed prisoners for use in dissections. In his will, Tagliacozzi gave the responsibility of his burial to the brotherhood.

He improved on the work of the Sicilian Surgeon Gustavo Branca and his son Antonio (who lived in Catania in the 15th century) and developed the so-called "Italian method" of nasal reconstruction. His principal work is entitled De Curtorum Chirurgia per Insitionem (1597) ("On the Surgery of Mutilation by Grafting"). In this book, he described in great detail the procedures that had been carried out empirically by the Branca and Vianeo families of Sicily since the 15th century AD. The work has bestowed upon him the honor of being one of the first plastic surgeons and a quote from the book has become synonymous with plastic surgery. "We restore, rebuild, and make whole those parts which nature hath given, but which fortune has taken away. Not so much that it may delight the eye, but that it might buoy up the spirit, and help the mind of the afflicted."

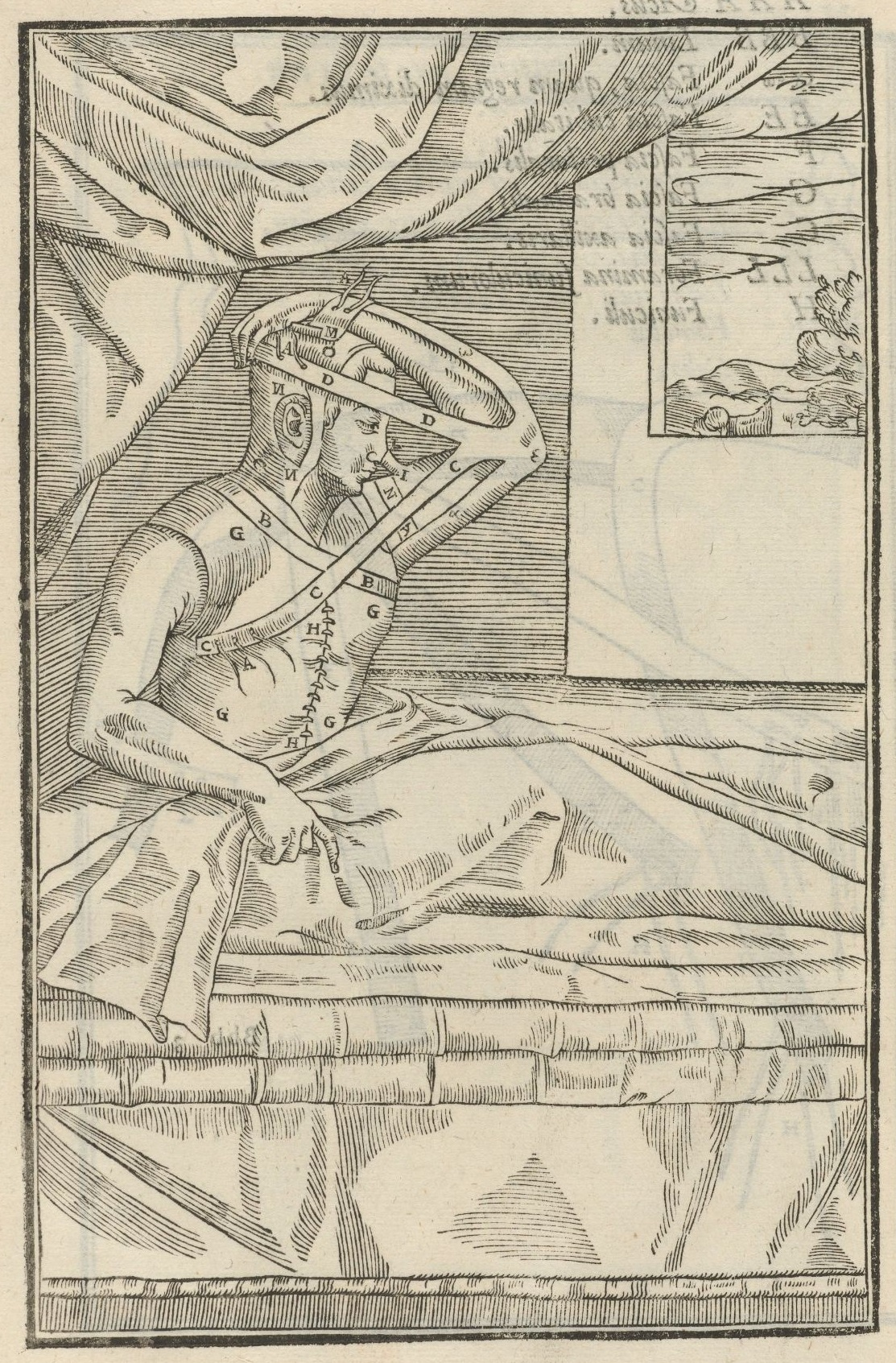
Original illustration of the now-called "Italian method".

== Death and memorial service ==
Tagliacozzi died in Bologna on 7 November 1599 and was buried in the church of the nuns of St. John the Baptist as he had ordered in his will. On the 26th of the same month a solemn mass was held in the same church in his honour which was attended by all doctors collegiate. During the ceremony Muzio Piacentini, a colleague of Tagliacozzi, gave the funeral oration, while some of the other participants recited rhymes of praise

== Brief history of the Italian method ==
This operation for nasal reconstruction (rhinoplasty) was developed in Italy due to the popularity of duelling with rapier in the fifteenth, sixteenth and seventeenth centuries. The inventors of the method are believed to be surgeons Gustavo Branca and his son Antonio, who lived c. 1400 in Catania. Branca de Branca (the senior) used a skin flap from the cheek and years later, his son Antonio Branca used a flap raised from the arm. It has been suggested that reconstructive surgical methods described in the Sushruta Samhita, which was translated into Arabic in the 8th century, traveled further to Italy and was incorporated into the methods described by Branca. The technique was then taken up in Calabria during the sixteenth century by two brothers, surgeons Peter and Paul Boiano (also called Vianeo). This process was described by the great anatomist Andreas Vesalius (1514–1564) but, he wrongly advised using the muscle and the skin of the arm to reconstruct the nose. The Italian method was criticized by Gabriele Fallopio (1523–1562) as such a procedure could force the patient to remain with the arm immobilized for many months, and the result was not guaranteed as the skin would often detach. Tagliacozzi probably knew the method of Boiano through the description of Leonardo Fioravanti. Tagliacozzi's method was practiced by Fortunio Liceti, who mentions it in his De monstruorum nature causis et differentiis of 1616; by Henricus Moinichen in Observationes Medical chirurgicae of 1691; and by Thomas Feyens, surgeon to the University of Louvain, who had studied in Bologna with Tagliacozzi, in his work De praecipuis Artis Chirurgicae controversiis which was published posthumously in 1669. Use of this surgical innovation declined during the seventeenth century throughout Europe and the method of Tagliacozzi was actually forgotten, until it was rediscovered and applied in 1800 by the German surgeon Karl Ferdinand von Graefe, whereupon it was used right up to the early twentieth century.
