= Annali dell'Istituto Superiore di Sanità =

- Discipline: Health sciences
- Language: English
- Edited by: Enrico Alleva

Publication details
- History: 1965-present
- Publisher: Istituto Superiore di Sanità (Italy)
- Frequency: Quarterly
- Open access: Yes
- Impact factor: 1.663 (2020)

Standard abbreviations
- ISO 4: Ann. Ist. Super. Sanità

Indexing
- CODEN: AISSAW
- ISSN: 0021-2571
- LCCN: 71419690
- OCLC no.: 476359621

Links
- Journal homepage; Online archive

The Annali dell'Istituto Superiore di Sanità is a quarterly peer-reviewed open access scientific journal covering biomedicine, the health sciences, and translational research. It is published by the Istituto Superiore di Sanità (ISS) and was established in 1965. It was the successor to the Rendiconti Istituto Superiore di Sanità, which were established in 1938 and published until 1962. The editor-in-chief is Enrico Alleva (ISS).

== Abstracting and indexing ==
The journal is abstracted and indexed in Index Medicus/MEDLINE/PubMed, EMBASE/Excerpta Medica, SCIELO, Science Citation Index Expanded, and The Zoological Record. According to the Journal Citation Reports, the journal has a 2020 impact factor of 1.663.
