= Fra Bonaventura Bisi =

Italian painter (1601–1659)

Bonaventura Bisi
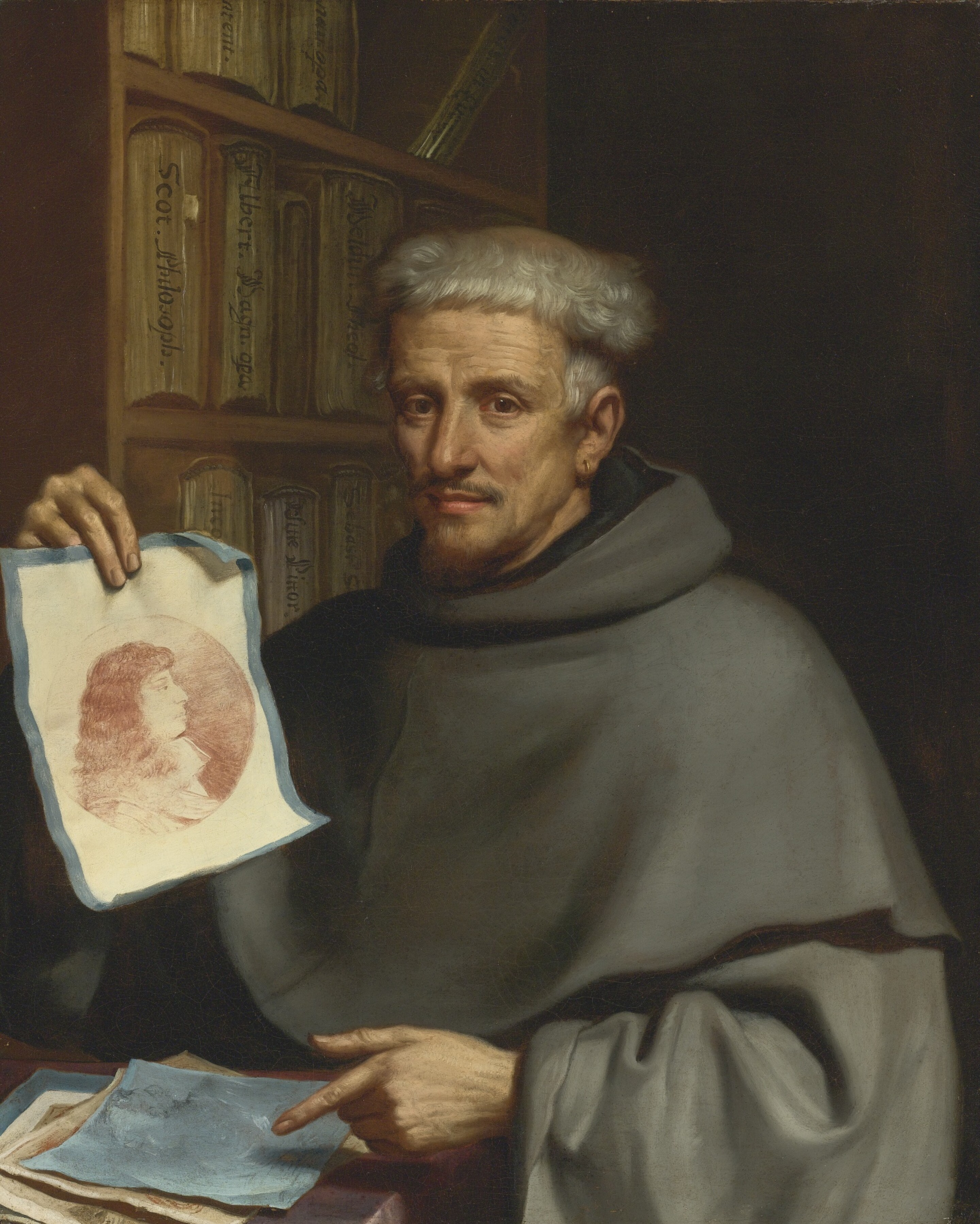
- Bonaventura Bisi
- Born: 9 October 1601; Bologna, Italy
- Died: 5 December 1659 (aged 58); Bologna, Italy
- Other names: Il Pittorino, Padre Pittorini
- Occupation: painter
- Known for: engraver and miniature painter

Fra' Bonaventura Bisi (9 October 1601 – 5 December 1659) was an Italian painter of the Baroque period. He was also called Il Pittorino or Padre Pittorini, as a Franciscan friar in the convent of S. Francesco in Bologna.

== Life and work ==
He was a pupil of Lucio Massari, and made miniature copies from the works of Correggio, Titian, and Guido Reni among others, which were collected in the cabinet of his patron, Alfonso IV of Modena. He also etched a few plates after Parmigianino, Reni, and an original Holy Family, with St. John and St. Elisabeth, (1631). He died at Bologna.
