= Cesare Magati =

Italian physician and professor of medicine

Doctor Cesare Magati
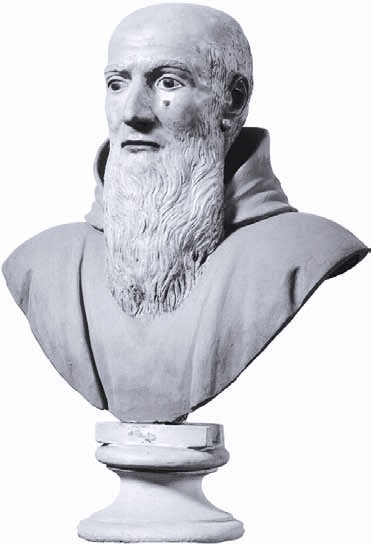
- Born: Cesare Camillo Magati; February 27, 1552; Scandiano, Duchy of Modena
- Died: 12 September 1633 (aged 81); Bologna, Papal States
- Other name: Liberato da Scandiano
- Education: University of Padua; University of Bologna
- Occupations: Physician, surgeon, friar
- Known for: promoting the idea of natural processes in wound healing
- Parent(s): Giorgio Magati and Claudia Magati (née Mattacoda)
- Scientific career
- Fields: Surgery
- Workplaces: Ospedale di Santa Maria della Consolazione; University of Ferrara

Cesare Magati or Caesar Magatus (14 July 1577 – 9 September 1647) was an Italian physician and professor of medicine. He is known chiefly from his book De rara medicatione Vulnerum (1616) where he promoted the idea of natural processes in wound healing. In 1618 he joined the Capuchin Order and the next year he took on the name of Padre Liberato da Scandiano.

== Life and work ==
Magati was born in Scandiano, Reggio Emilia, in the landed family of Giorgio and Laura Mattacoda. A brother, Giovanni Battista, became a physician while a sister became the grandmother of Antonio Vallisneri. He studied at Pauda and from 1596, medicine at the University of Bologna. Graduating in 1597 he worked at the Hospital of Santa Maria della Consolazione in Rome. He was influenced by the teachings of Flaminio Rota, Giulio Cesare Claudini, and Giovanni Battista Cortese. He then took the exam of the College of Physicians and became a surgeon at the Hospital of Santa Anna. He then returned to Scandiano and around 1612, through the influence of Marquis Enzio Bentivoglio, he became a lecturer in surgery at Ferrara. In 1618 he became very ill and gave up teaching. He joined the Capuchin order as a lay brother in 1618 and took his vows in Ravenna the next year, and going by the name of Padre Liberato da Scandiano. He continued to practice medicine for the House of Este.

In 1647 Magati was operated on for gall-stones at Bologna but he died three days after the surgery.

Magati's major contribution was in wound hygiene and healing. He went against the contemporary practice of frequent change in dressing and the use of ointments. He instead suggested that natural processed played a key role in healing and that these processes needed to be aided. For this he is remembered as a fundamental reformer of surgery. The principles outlined by Magati in his De rara medicatione vulnerum excited a great deal of debate: they were confirmed by the renowned physician Ludovico Settala (1552–1633) but were challenged mostly by Daniel Sennert.

== Main works ==
- De rara medicatione vulnerum, 2 voll., Venice, apud Ambrosium, & Bartholomaeum Dei, fratres, 1616.
- Considerationes medicae, Bologna, 1637.

== Bibliography ==
- Capoccia, Anna Rita (2006). "MAGATI, Cesare". Dizionario Biografico degli Italiani (in Italian). Vol. 67: Macchi–Malaspina. Rome: Istituto dell'Enciclopedia Italiana. ISBN 978-88-12-00032-6.
- Capparoni, Pietro (1932). "Cesare Magati (Padre Liberato da Scandiano dei Minori Cappuccini)". Profili Bio-bibliografici di Medici e Naturalisti Celebri Italiani Dal Secolo XV al Secolo XVIII. Rome: 70–75.
- Cesare Magati entry (in Italian) by Agostino Palmerini in the Enciclopedia Treccani, 1934
- Putti, Vittorio (1941). "Cesare Magati (1579– 1647)". Biografie di Chirurghi Dal XVI a XIX Secolo. Bologna: 9–16.
- Premuda, Loris (1970). "Magati, Cesare". In Charles Coulston Gillispie (ed.). Dictionary of Scientific Biography. Vol. 9. New York: Charles Scribner's Sons. pp. 4–5.
