= Santa Caterina d'Alessandria, Padua =

Church building in Padua, Italy

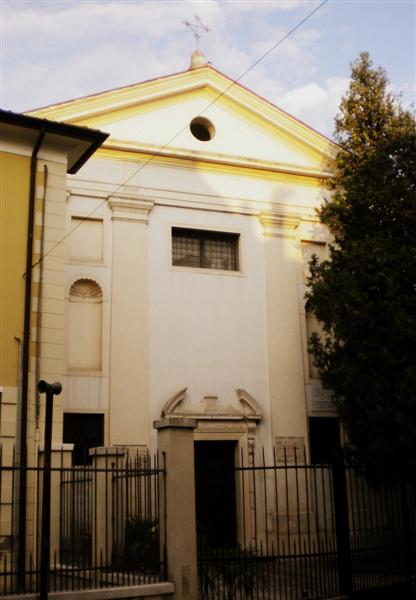
Chiesa di Santa Caterina a Padova, facciata

Santa Caterina d'Alessandria is a small, Baroque-style, Roman Catholic church and convent located on via Cesare Battisti #245 in the city of Padua in the region of Veneto, Italy.

== History ==
A church was present here by the 13th century. Catherine of Alexandria was considered one of the patron saints of the University of Padua. By the 14th century, a student college was founded here. A nobleman of Padua, Jacopo D'Arqua, endowed the construction in 1594.

The parish was suppressed in 1610 and the college converted into an Augustinian monastery for nuns who tended to poor women who lived on the margins of society. Built with the typical layout of a thirteenth-century oratory, in the 17th century it was renovated and decorated in Baroque style. A baptismal font used to baptize Livia and Gianvincenzo, children of Galileo Galilei was moved to Santa Sofia, Padua.

The altar has polychrome marble with columns and a tympanum surmounted by sculptures, completed by a sculptor of the Bonazza family, as well as Giordano and Damini. The main altarpiece in the 19th century depicted the Mystical Marriage of St Catherine by Marcantonio Bonaccorsi. The church also had a canvas depicting the Annunciation (1718) by Bartolomeo Moro. The frescoes on the walls date back to the previous structure and date from the 13th to the 16th century.

The violinist Giuseppe Tartini was buried here in 1770.

Severely damaged by an earthquake in 1976, the church was restored by 2016. The organ dates back to the mid-18th century. It was moved here in 1844 from the Church of San Paolo near the Ponte Molino. It was restored in 2005.

The church is used by the University of Padua for various celebrations in conjunction with the Catholic student center.

== See also ==
- Catholic Church in Italy
