= Marcello Malpighi =

Italian biologist and physician

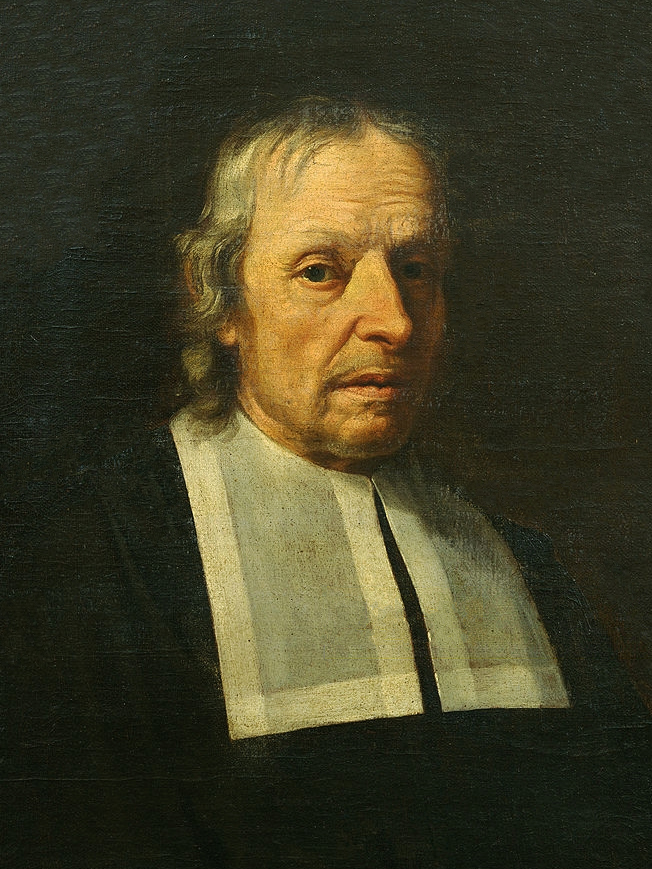
- Marcello Malpighi, a portrait from life by Carlo Cignani
- Born: 10 March 1628; Crevalcore, Papal States
- Died: 30 November 1694 (aged 66); Rome, Papal States
- Education: University of Bologna
- Scientific career
- Fields: Anatomy, histology, physiology, embryology, medicine
- Workplaces: University of Bologna; University of Pisa; University of Messina
- Doctoral advisor: Giovanni Alfonso Borelli
- Doctoral students: Antonio Maria Valsalva

Marcello Malpighi (10 March 1628 – 30 November 1694) was an Italian biologist and physician, who is referred to as the "founder of microscopical anatomy, histology and father of physiology and embryology". Malpighi's name is borne by several physiological features related to the biological excretory system, such as the Malpighian corpuscles and Malpighian pyramids of the kidneys and the Malpighian tubule system of insects. The splenic lymphoid nodules are often called the "Malpighian bodies of the spleen" or Malpighian corpuscles. The botanical family Malpighiaceae is also named after him. He was the first person to see capillaries in animals, and he discovered the link between arteries and veins that had eluded William Harvey. Malpighi was one of the earliest people to observe red blood cells under a microscope, after Jan Swammerdam. His treatise De polypo cordis (1666) was important for understanding blood composition, as well as how blood clots. In it, Malpighi described how the form of a blood clot differed in the right against the left sides of the heart.

The use of the microscope enabled Malpighi to discover that insects do not use lungs to breathe, but small holes in their skin called tracheae. Malpighi also studied the anatomy of the brain and concluded this organ is a gland. In terms of modern endocrinology, this deduction is correct because the hypothalamus of the brain has long been recognized for its hormone-secreting capacity.

Because Malpighi had a wide knowledge of both plants and animals, he made contributions to the scientific study of both. The Royal Society of London published two volumes of his botanical and zoological works in 1675 and 1679. Another edition followed in 1687, and a supplementary volume in 1697. In his autobiography, Malpighi speaks of his Anatome Plantarum, decorated with the engravings of Robert White, as "the most elegant format in the whole literate world."

His study of plants led him to conclude that plants had tubules similar to those he saw in insects like the silkworm (using his microscope, he probably saw the stomata, through which plants exchange carbon dioxide with oxygen). Malpighi observed that when a ring-like portion of bark was removed on a trunk a swelling occurred in the tissues above the ring, and he correctly interpreted this as growth stimulated by food coming down from the leaves, and being blocked above the ring.

== Early years ==
Malpighi was born on 10 March 1628 at Crevalcore near Bologna, Italy. The son of well-to-do parents, Malpighi was educated in his native city, entering the University of Bologna at the age of 17. In a posthumous work delivered and dedicated to the Royal Society in London in 1697, Malpighi says he completed his grammatical studies in 1645, at which point he began to apply himself to the study of peripatetic philosophy. He completed these studies in about 1649, where at the persuasion of his mother Frances Natalis, he began to study physics. When his parents and grandmother became ill, he returned to his family home near Bologna to care for them. Malpighi studied Aristotelian philosophy at the University of Bologna while he was very young. He joined the school of anatomy under Bartolomeo Massari and was one of nine students who met at the home of the master to conduct dissections. He married Francesca the daughter of Massari but it was short-lived as she died shortly after. Despite opposition from the university authorities because he was non-Bolognese by birth, in 1653 he was granted doctorates in both medicine and philosophy. He later graduated as a medical doctor at the age of 25. Subsequently, he was appointed as a teacher, whereupon he immediately dedicated himself to further study in anatomy and medicine. For most of his career, Malpighi combined an intense interest in scientific research with a fond love of teaching. He was invited to correspond with the Royal Society in 1667 by Henry Oldenburg, and became a fellow of the society the next year.

In 1656, Ferdinand II of Tuscany invited him to the professorship of theoretical medicine at the University of Pisa. There Malpighi began his lifelong friendship with Giovanni Borelli, mathematician and naturalist, who was a prominent supporter of the Accademia del Cimento, one of the first scientific societies. Malpighi questioned the prevailing medical teachings at Pisa, tried experiments on colour changes in blood, and attempted to recast anatomical, physiological, and medical problems of the day. Family responsibilities and poor health prompted Malpighi's return in 1659 to the University of Bologna, where he continued to teach and do research with his microscopes. In 1661 he identified and described the pulmonary and capillary network connecting small arteries with small veins. Malpighi's views evoked increasing controversy and dissent, mainly from envy and lack of understanding on the part of his colleagues.

== Career ==
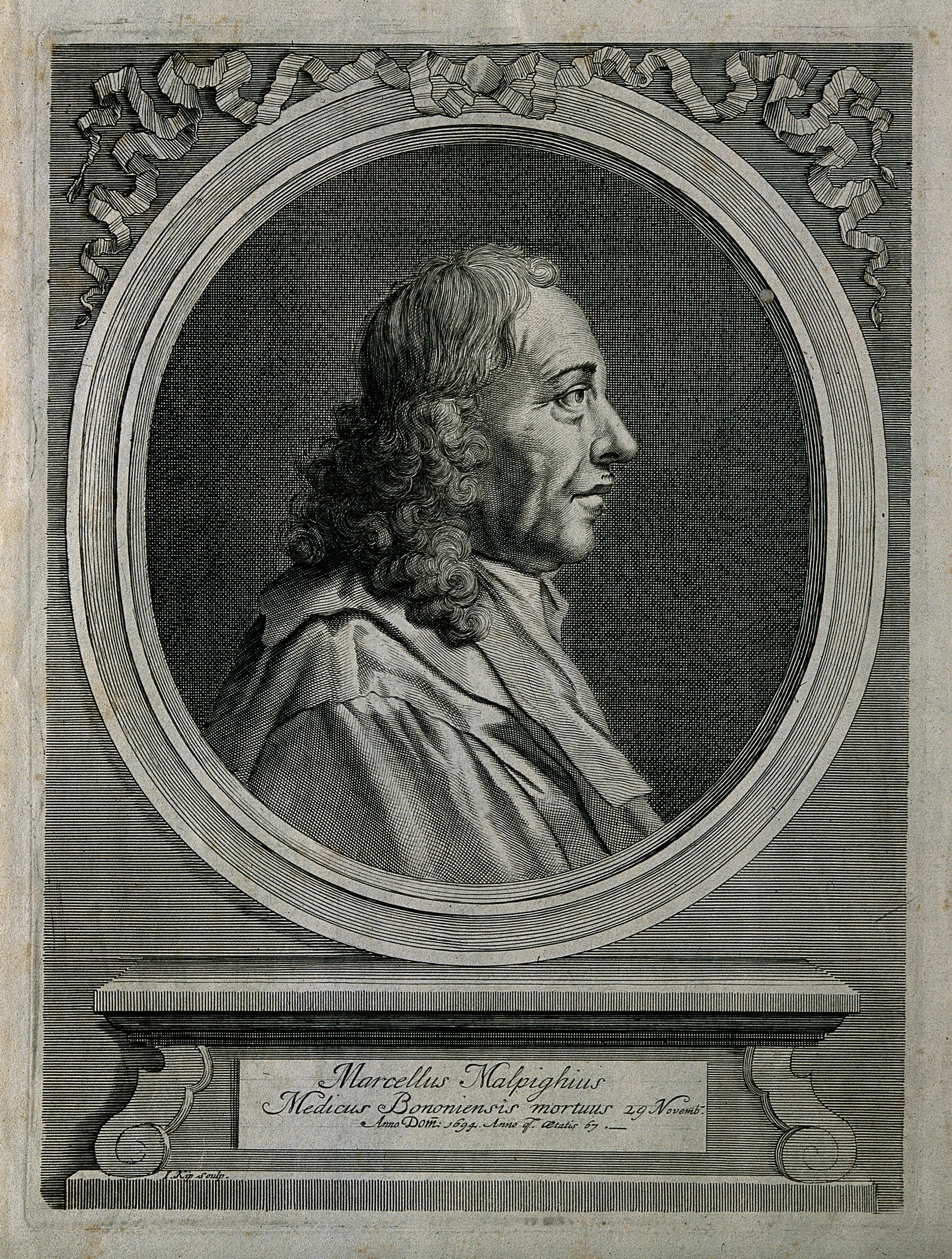
Portrait of Marcello Malpighi in Opera Posthuma, London 1696

In 1653, his father, mother, and grandmother being dead, Malpighi left his family villa and returned to the University of Bologna to study anatomy. In 1656, he was made a reader at Bologna, and then a professor of physics at Pisa, where he began to abandon the disputative method of learning and apply himself to a more experimental method of research. Based on this research, he wrote some Dialogues against the Peripatetics and Galenists (those who followed the precepts of Galen and were spearheaded at the University Bologna by fellow physician but inveterate foe Giovanni Girolamo Sbaraglia), which were destroyed when his house burned down. Weary of philosophical disputation, in 1660, Malpighi returned to Bologna and dedicated himself to the study of anatomy. He subsequently discovered a new structure of the lungs which led him to several disputes with the learned medical men of the times. In 1662, he was made a professor of physics at the Academy of Messina.

Retiring from university life to his villa in the country near Bologna in 1663, he worked as a physician while continuing to conduct experiments on the plants and insects he found on his estate. There he made discoveries of the structure of plants which he published in his Observations. At the end of 1666, Malpighi was invited to return to the public academy at Messina, which he did in 1667. Although he accepted temporary chairs at the universities of Pisa and Messina, throughout his life he continuously returned to Bologna to practice medicine, a city that repaid him by erecting a monument in his memory after his death.

As a physician, Malpighi's medical consultations with his patients, which were mostly those belonging to social elite classes, proved useful in better understanding the links between the human anatomy, disease pathology, and treatments for said diseases. Furthermore, Malpighi conducted his consultations not only by bedside, but also by post, using letters to request and conduct them for various patients. These letters served as social connections for the medical practices he performed, allowing his ideas to reach the public even in the face of criticism. These connections that Malpighi created in his practice became even more widespread due to the fact that he practised in various countries. However, long distances complicated consults for some of his patients. The manner in which Malpighi practised medicine also reveals that it was customary in his time for Italian patients to have multiple attending physicians as well as consulting physicians. One of Malpighi's principles of medical practice was that he did not rely on anecdotes or experiences concerning remedies for various illnesses. Rather, he used his knowledge of human anatomy and disease pathology to practice what he denoted as "rational" medicine ("rational" medicine was in contrast to "empirics"). Malpighi did not abandon traditional substances or treatments, but he did not employ their use simply based on past experiences that did not draw from the nature of the underlying anatomy and disease process. Specifically in his treatments, Malpighi's goal was to reset fluid imbalances by coaxing the body to correct them on its own. For example, fluid imbalances should be fixed over time by urination and not by artificial methods such as purgatives and vesicants. In addition to Malpighi's "rational" approaches, he also believed in so-called "miraculous," or "supernatural" healing. For this to occur, though, he argued that the body could not have attempted to expel any malignant matter, such as vomit. Cases in which this did occur, when healing could not be considered miraculous, were known as "crises."

In 1668, Malpighi received a letter from Mr. Oldenburg of the Royal Society in London, inviting him to correspond. Malpighi wrote his history of the silkworm in 1668, and sent the manuscript to Mr. Oldenburg. As a result, Malpighi was made a member of the Royal Society in 1669. In 1671, Malpighi's Anatomy of Plants was published in London by the Royal Society, and he simultaneously wrote to Mr. Oldenburg, telling him of his recent discoveries regarding the lungs, fibres of the spleen and testicles, and several other discoveries involving the brain and sensory organs. He also shared more information regarding his research on plants. At that time, he related his disputes with some younger physicians who were strenuous supporters of the Galenic principles and opposed all new discoveries. Following many other discoveries and publications, in 1691, Malpighi was invited to Rome by Pope Innocent XII to become a papal physician and professor of medicine at the Papal Medical School. He remained in Rome until his death.

Marcello Malpighi is buried in the church of Santi Gregorio e Siro, in Bologna, where nowadays can be seen a marble monument to the scientist with an inscription in Latin remembering – among other things – his "SUMMUM INGENIUM / INTEGERRIMAM VITAM / FORTEM STRENUAMQUE MENTEM / AUDACEM SALUTARIS ARTIS AMOREM" (great genius, honest life, strong and tough mind, daring love for the medical art).

== Research ==
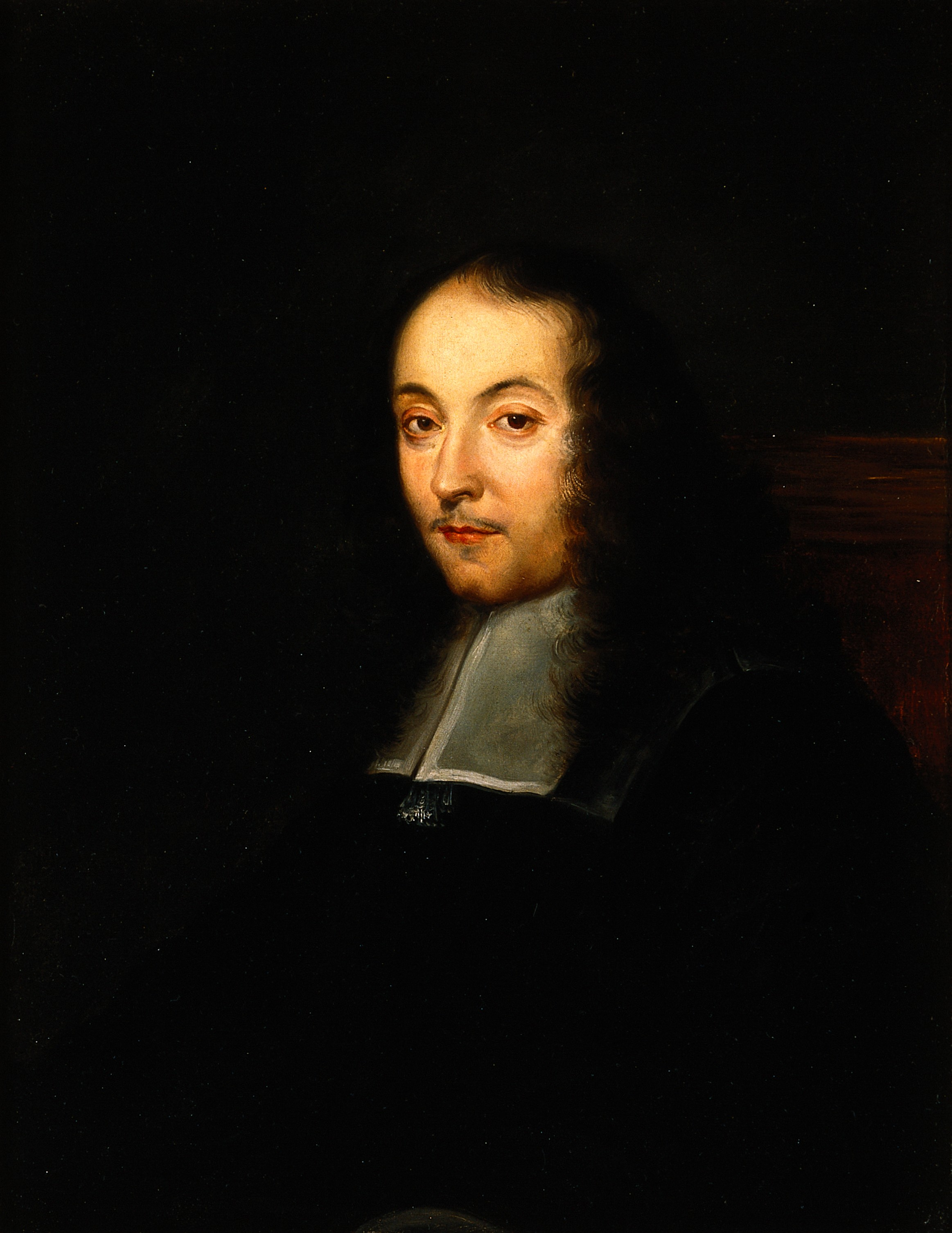
Portrait of Marcello Malpighi

Around the age of 38, and with a remarkable academic career behind him, Malpighi decided to dedicate his free time to anatomical studies. Although he conducted some of his studies using vivisection and others through the dissection of corpses, his most illustrative efforts appear to have been based on the use of the microscope. Because of this work, many microscopic anatomical structures are named after Malpighi, including a skin layer (Malpighi layer) and two different Malpighian corpuscles in the kidneys and the spleen, as well as the Malpighian tubules in the excretory system of insects.

Although a Dutch spectacle maker created the compound lens and inserted it in a microscope around the turn of the 17th century, and Galileo had applied the principle of the compound lens to the making of his microscope patented in 1609, its possibilities as a microscope had remained unexploited for half a century, until Robert Hooke improved the instrument. Following this, Marcello Malpighi, Hooke, and two other early investigators associated with the Royal Society, Nehemiah Grew and Antoine van Leeuwenhoek were fortunate to have a virtually untried tool in their hands as they began their investigations.

In 1661, Malpighi observed capillary structures in frog lungs. Malpighi's first attempt at examining circulation in the lungs was in September 1660, with the dissection of sheep and other mammals where he would inject black ink into the pulmonary artery. Tracing the inks distribution through the artery to the veins in the animal's lungs however, the chosen sheep/mammal's large size was limiting for his observation of capillaries as they were too small for magnification. Malpighi's frog dissection in 1661, proved to be a suitable size that could be magnified to display the capillary network not seen in the larger animals. In discovering and observing the capillaries in the frog's lungs, Malpighi studied the movement of the blood in a contained system. This contrasted the previous view of an open circulatory system in which blood would come from the liver/spleen and pool into open spaces in the body. This discovery of capillaries also contributed to William Harvey's theory of blood circulation, with capillaries acting as the connection from veins to arteries and confirming a closed system of circulation in animals.

Furthering his analysis of the lungs, Malpighi identified the airways branched into thin membraned spherical cavities which he likened to honeycomb holes surrounded by capillary vessels, in his 1661 work "De pulmonibus observationes anatomicae". These lung structures now known as alveoli he used to describe the air pathway as continuous inhalation and exhalation with the alveoli at the ends of the pathway acting as a "imperfect sponge" for the air to enter the body. Extrapolating to humans, he offered an explanation for how air and blood mix in the lungs. Malpighi also used the microscope for his studies of the skin, kidneys, and liver.

In the years 1663–1667, at the University of Messina where his research focus was on studying the human nervous system where he identified and described nerve endings in the body, structure of the brain, and optic nerve. All of his work in 1665 surrounding the nervous system he published in 3 separate works published in the same year titled, De Lingua about taste and the tongue, De Cerebro about the brain and De Externo Tactus Organo about feeling/touch sensation. In regards to his work on the tongue he discovered small muscle bumps, taste buds, which he called "papillae" and when examining them he described a linked connection to nerve endings that gave the taste sensation when eating. Furthermore, in 1686 through studying a bovine tongue Malpighi dividing the tongue papillae into separate "patches" on the tongues length. When studying the brain, he was one of the first to try to map the grey and white tissue and hypothesized a connection between the brain and spinal cord through nerve endings.

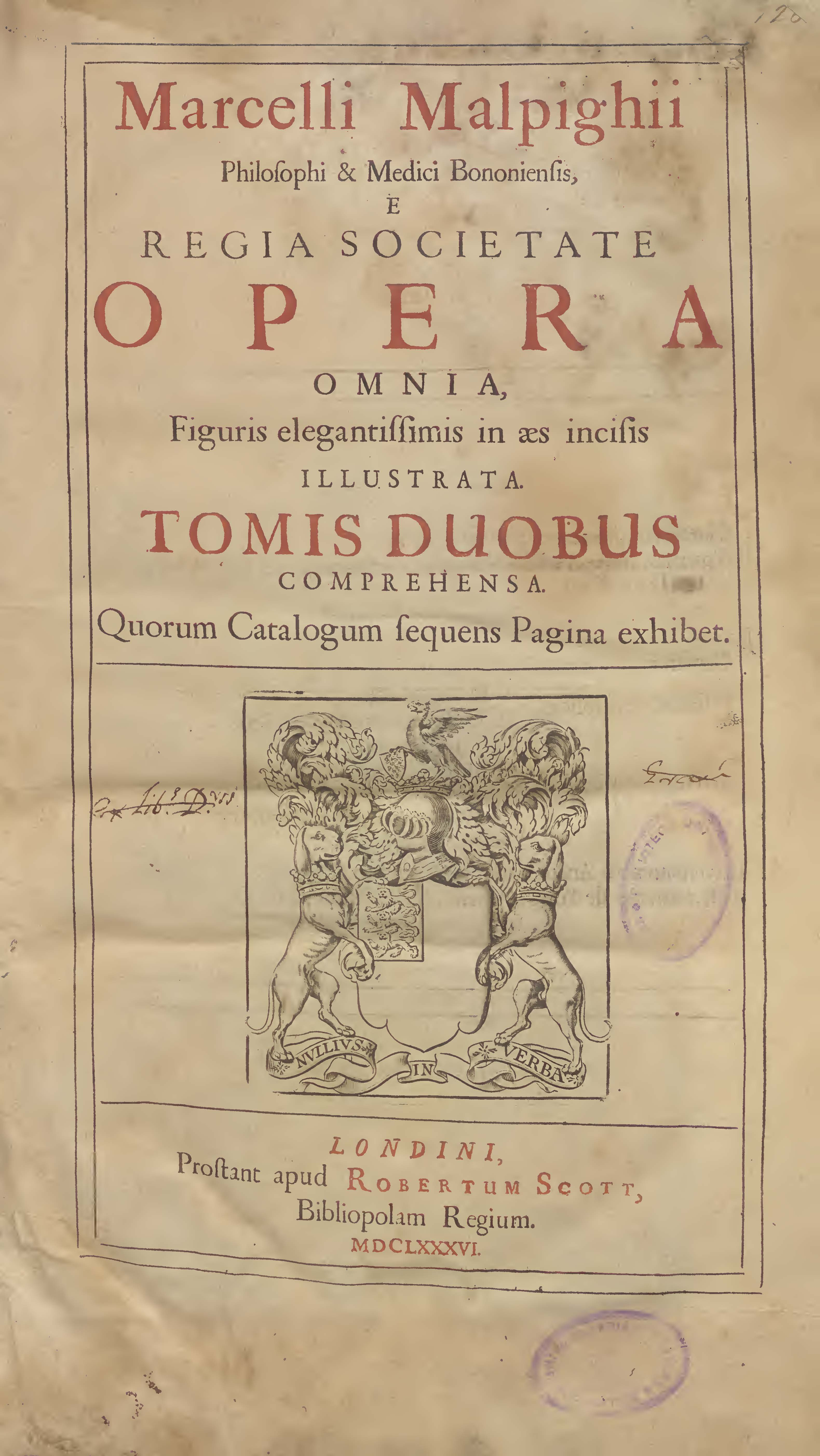
Opera Omnia (Complete Works), London 1686

Malpighi's work on plant anatomy was inspired in Messina when visiting his patron Visconte Ruffo's garden where a chestnut tree's split branch had a structure that intrigued him, this structure in modern literature being xylem. He examined the structure in different plants and noted the arrangement of xylem was in either a ring shape or in scattered groupings in the stem. This distinction was later used by biologists to separate the two major families of plants.

A talented sketch artist, Malpighi seems to have been the first author to have made detailed drawings of individual organs of flowers. In his Anatome plantarum is a longitudinal section of a flower of Nigella (his Melanthi, literally honey-flower) with details of the nectariferous organs. He adds that it is strange that nature has produced on the leaves of the flower shell-like organs in which honey is produced.

Malpighi had success in tracing the ontogeny of plant organs, and the serial development of the shoot owing to his instinct shaped in the sphere of animal embryology. He specialized in seedling development, and in 1679, he published a volume containing a series of exquisitely drawn and engraved images of the stages of development of Leguminosae (beans) and Cucurbitaceae (squash, melons). Later, he published material depicting the development of the date palm. The great Swedish botanist Linnaeus named the genus Malpighia in honour of Malpighi's work with plants; Malpighia is the type genus for the Malpighiaceae, a family of tropical and subtropical flowering plants.

Because Malpighi was concerned with teratology (the scientific study of the visible conditions caused by the interruption or alteration of normal development) he expressed grave misgivings about the view of his contemporaries that the galls of trees and herbs gave birth to insects. He conjectured (correctly) that the creatures in question arose from eggs previously laid in the plant tissue.

Malpighi's investigations of the lifecycle of plants and animals led him to the topic of reproduction. He created detailed drawings of his studies of chick embryo development, starting from 2–3 days after fertilization with these drawings of embryos having a focus on the developmental timing of the limbs and organs. Additionally, seed development in plants (such as the lemon tree), and the transformation of caterpillars into insects. Malpighi also postulated about the embryotic growth of humans, written in a letter to Girolamo Correr, a patron of scientists, Malphighi suggested that all the components of the circulatory system would have been developed at the same time in embryo. His discoveries helped to illuminate philosophical arguments surrounding the topics of emboîtment, pre-existence, preformation, epigenesis, and metamorphosis.

== Years in Rome ==
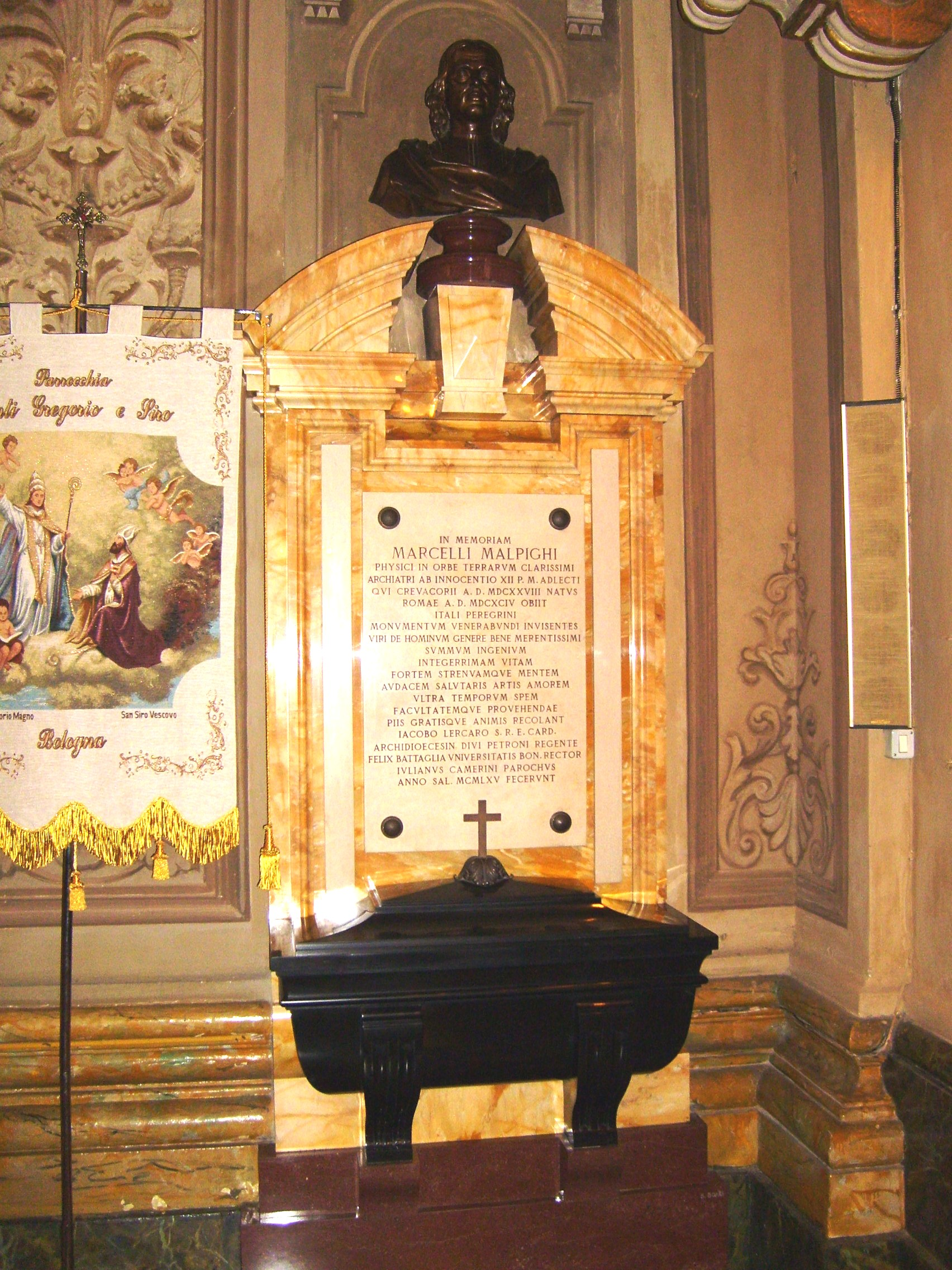
Malpighi's tomb in Bologna

In 1691 Pope Innocent XII invited him to Rome as papal physician. He taught medicine in the Papal Medical School and wrote a long treatise about his studies which he donated to the Royal Society of London.

Marcello Malpighi died of apoplexy (an old-fashioned term for a stroke or stroke-like symptoms) in Rome on 30 November 1694, at the age of 66. In accordance with his wishes, an autopsy was performed. The Royal Society published his studies in 1696. Asteroid 11121 Malpighi is named in his honour.

== Works ==
- Anatome Plantarum, two volumes published in 1675 and 1679, an exhaustive study of botany published by the Royal Society
- De viscerum structura exercitatio
- De pulmonis epistolae
- De polypo cordis, 1666
- Dissertatio epistolica de formatione pulli in ovo, 1673

Online editions

- Malpighi, Marcello (1685). De Externo Tactus Organo Anatomica Observatio. Naples: Aegidium Longum.
- Malpighi, Marcello (1675). Anatome plantarum: Cui subjungitur appendix, iteratas & auctas ejusdem authoris de ovo incubato observationes continens (in Latin). London: Johannis Martyn.
- Malpighi, Marcello (1679). Anatome plantarum: Pars altera (in Latin). London: Johannis Martyn.
- Malpighi, Marcello (2008). Redfern, Margaret; Cameron, Alexander J.; Down, Kevin (eds.). De Gallis – On Galls. Ray Society. Vol. 170. ISBN 9780903874410.

== Sources ==
- Adelmann, Howard (1966). Marcello Malpighi and the Evolution of Embryology 5 vol., Cornell University Press, Ithaca, N.Y. OCLC 306783
