= Assumption of the Virgin (Annibale Carracci, Madrid) =

Painting by Annibale Carracci

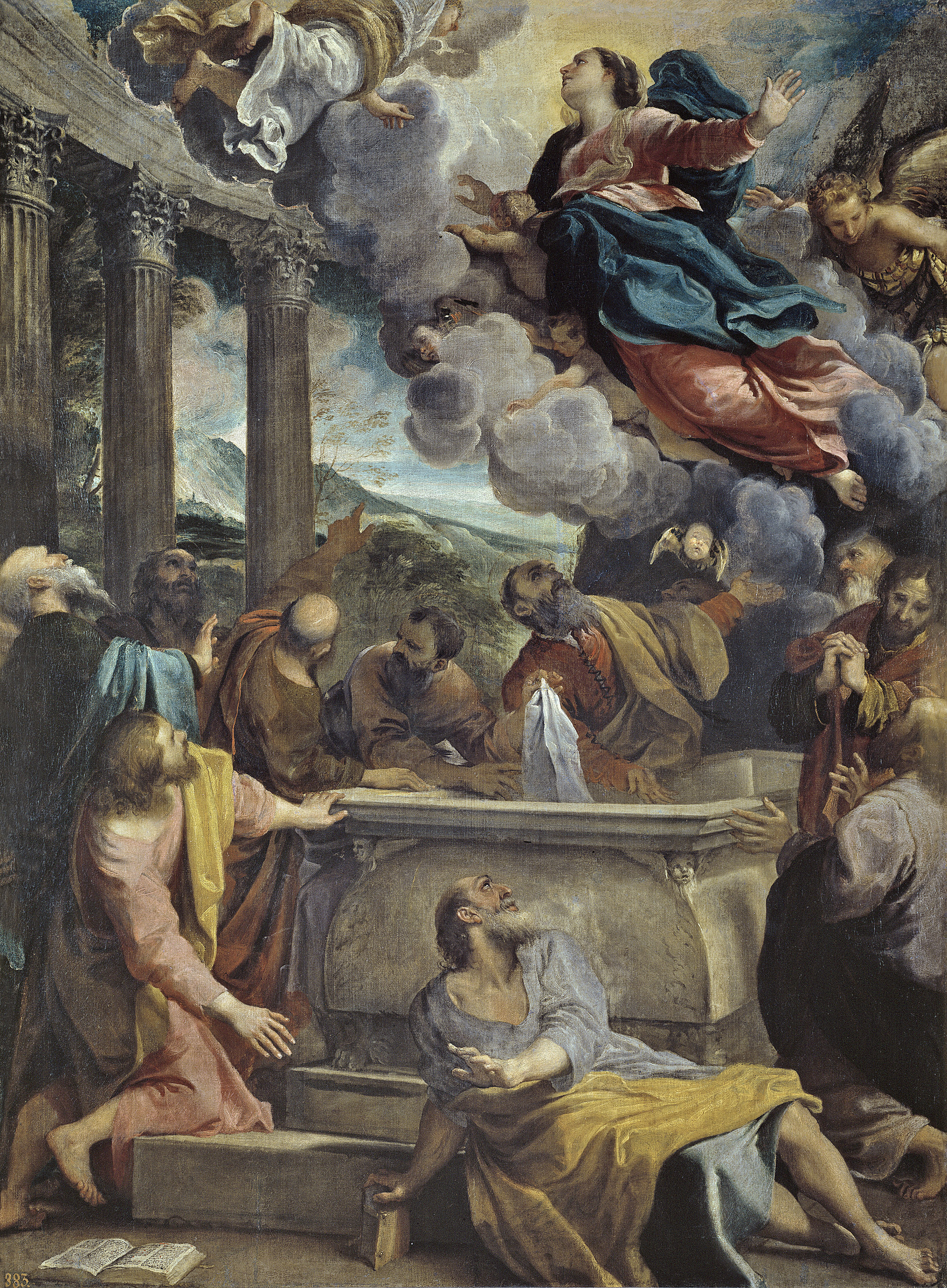
- Artist: Annibale Carracci
- Year: 1590
- Medium: Oil on canvas
- Dimensions: 130 cm × 97 cm (51 in × 38 in)
- Location: Museo del Prado; Madrid

The Assumption of the Virgin is a painting by the Italian Baroque artist Annibale Carracci which was completed in 1587 and is now in the Museo del Prado in Madrid. The same subject was depicted by Carracci on the altarpiece of the famous Cerasi Chapel in Rome.

== See also ==
- Marian art in the Catholic Church
- Assumption of the Virgin Mary in art
