= Giuseppe Montalenti =

Italian geneticist and zoologist (1904–1990)

- Born: 13 December 1904
- Died: 2 July 1990 (aged 85)

Giuseppe Montalenti (13 December 1904 - 2 July 1990) was an Italian geneticist and zoologist. He was a genetics professor at the University of Naples (since 1940) and at the Sapienza University of Rome (since 1963). He was elected a member of Accademia dei Lincei (1951).

== Biography ==
Montalenti was born in Asti. His father was a jurist and a magistrate, and his grandfather was a naturalist and an entomologist.

After high school, Giuseppe Montalenti entered the University of Turin, but in 1923, his father was promoted and Giuseppe moved with him to Rome, entering Sapienza University of Rome. He graduated at 1926.

In 1937–1939, he was an assistant at the Zoological Institute of the University of Bologna.

In 1939, he became the head of Zoological Department of Stazione Zoologica Anton Dohrn.

Since 1940, he was a genetics professor at the University of Naples.

Since 1963, he was a genetics professor at the Sapienza University of Rome.

In 1958, he became the dean of the Faculty of Sciences at the Sapienza.

He was an editor of Enciclopedia Italiana and Dizionario enciclopedico italiano.

He died in Rome at the age of 85.

== Membership ==
In 1951, he was elected a member of Accademia dei Lincei, and he was its president in 1981 and in 1985.

He was also a member of other Italian academies, namely Accademia dei XL, Accademia Pontaniana and Istituto Lombardo Accademia di Scienze e Lettere.

Moreover, he was a foreign member of Royal Swedish Academy of Sciences, Linnean Society of London, New York Academy of Sciences, and the American Philosophical Society.

== Works ==
Main works:

- Lazzaro Spallanzani (1928);
- Elementi di genetica (1939);
- Problemi di biologia della riproduzione (1945);
- Compendio di embriologia (1945);
- L'evoluzione (1958);
- Storia della biologia e della medicina (1962);
- Introduzione alla genetica (1971);
- Charles Darwin (1982);
- Introduzione alla biologia (1983).
