= Giovanni Battista Ramenghi =

Italian painter

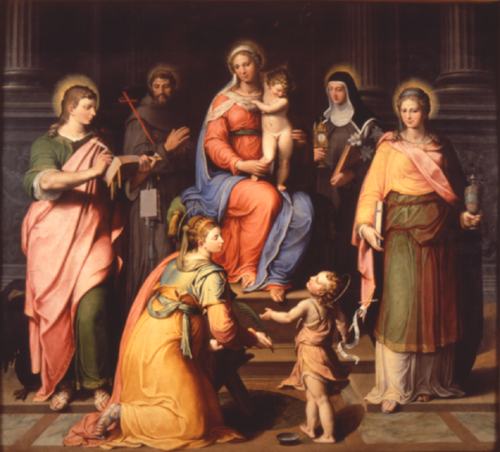
Madonna and Child with Saints. Pinacoteca Nazionale di Bologna

Giovanni Battista Ramenghi (1521, Bologna - 1601, Bologna) was an Italian painter. He is sometimes known as Bagnacavallo junior or Bagnacavallo the Younger to distinguish him from his father Bartolomeo Ramenghi (known as Bagnacavallo).

== Life ==
He trained in his father's studio and accompanied Primaticcio on his trip to France, where he was influenced for a time by the Fontainebleau School. Working to meet the strictures of the Counter-Reformation, Ramenghi was one of the most conservative painters of the Bolognese school of the time, moving on from Raphael but refusing to be influenced by the early work of the young Annibale Carracci

== Works ==
- Incredulity of St Thomas, Chiesa dei San Girolamo, Bagnacavallo
- Rosario Altarpiece, Chiesa del Carmine, Bagnacavallo
- Sacra Conversazione with Saints Dominic and Catherine of Siena, Museo civico delle Capuccine, Bagnacavallo
- Madonna and Child with the Infant St John the Baptist, St Catherine of Alexandria and Saint Dominic, Pinacoteca civica di Forlì
- Madonna and Child with Saints John the Baptist, John the Evangelist, Francis, Clare, Catherine and Mary Magdalene (signed and dated to 1563), Pinacoteca Nazionale di Bologna
- Crucifixion with Saint John the Evangelist, Saint Mary Magdalene and Saint Luke, Civitella di Romagna, Santuario della Madonna della Suasia
- Crucifixion with the Madonna and Three Saints, Bologna, Chiesa di Sant'Isaia
- The Mystic Marriage of St Catherine, Musée Jeanne d'Aboville (La Fère, France)
