= San Barbaziano =

San Barbaziano may refer to:

- San Barbaziano, Bologna, a former church
- San Barbaziano, a frazione of Tribiano
- San Barbaziano, name of Saint Barbatianus in Italian
