= Bombing of Bologna in World War II =

Bombing of Bologna
- Part of World War II
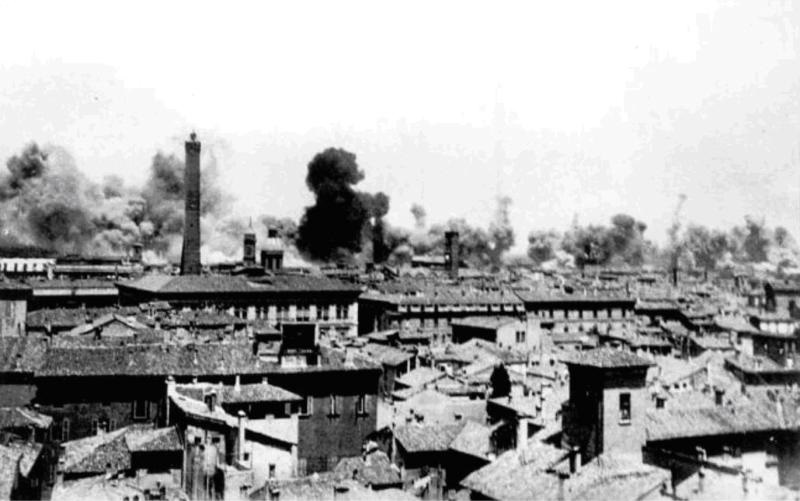
- An air raid on Bologna in 1943
Date	July 1943–April 1945
Location	Bologna, Italy

Belligerents
United Kingdom; United States	Italy; Italian Social Republic (1943–1945); Germany

During World War II the Italian city of Bologna, the regional capital and largest city of Emilia-Romagna, suffered nearly a hundred air raids by the Royal Air Force and the USAAF, mostly aimed at disabling its strategically important marshalling yards, used for the movements of German troops and supplies between Northeastern Italy and central Italy. These raids destroyed or damaged almost half of the city, and caused nearly 2,500 victims among its population.

== History ==
In the summer of 1943 the marshalling yards of Bologna, among the largest in Northern Italy, had been included by British commands in a list of railway objectives that would have been useful to attack in order to hamper the movements of German troops and supplies from the Brenner to Rome and from Udine to Florence, as well as on other secondary lines. The San Donato marshalling yard was the largest railroad freight terminal in Italy, and one of the largest in Europe.

=== 1943 ===
In the first three years of war, Bologna was relatively safe from air attacks, as it was outside of the range of British bombers that operating from Malta attacked cities in Southern Italy, and at the limit of the RAF Bomber Command aircraft that, taking off from England, attacked the three cities of Italy's "industrial triangle" in the north-west. The first air raid on Bologna therefore only took place in the night between 15 and 16 July 1943, less than two months before the Armistice of Cassibile, when a dozen of Avro Lancaster bombers, having taken off from air bases in the Lincolnshire and participating in a shuttle bombing experiment (from England to Algeria and return, after refuelling in North Africa), dropped 19 tons of bombs on the city's power plant, hitting it but causing little damage (thus failing the main objective of this raid, the interruption of the supply of electrical power to the railway). Some bombs also fell on the city, killing ten civilians and wounding twenty.

The second air raid on Bologna, on 24 July 1943, was far heavier; 51 Boeing B-17 Flying Fortress bombers of the 12th Air Force, having taken off from Algeria with additional fuel tanks, dropped 136 tons of bombs on the city's marshalling yards, but many of the bombs also fell on the city itself, destroying completely 85 buildings, destroying partially another 61 and causing damage to a further 259. Civilian casualties were about two hundred, with an equal number of wounded. Another air raid took place on 2 September, by 71 B-17s of the 12th Air Force, which again attacked the marshalling yard and again hit the city as well; 40 buildings were destroyed completely, 40 destroyed partially and 150 damaged, with thirty victims among the population.

The proclamation of the Armistice (8 September 1943) did not change the situation; Bologna was swiftly occupied by German troops, which kept using its marshalling yards for their movements, and thus the city continued being an objective for the Allied air forces. On 25 September 1943 Bologna suffered the bloodiest air raid in the entire war: 71 B-17 bombers of the 12th Air Force, out of 113 that had taken off from Tunisia, dropped 210 tons of bombs against the marshalling yard, but heavy cloud cover resulted in the bombers dropping the bombs over the entire city. The old city centre was among the hardest hit areas, but the suburbs, the Bolognina district and the area around the city's hippodrome also suffered heavy damage. 295 buildings were completely destroyed, 199 partially destroyed and 371 damaged; due to delay in issuing the air raid alarm (the Italian sighting network had ceased to exist with the German occupation, and the Germans had not yet set up a new network) the population was caught off guard, and this, along with the crowding caused by the market day and by the return of many evacuees who had believed that the Armistice meant that the Allied air raids had ended, resulted in a heavy death toll: between 936 and 1,033 people were killed, over a thousand were wounded. Hundreds of people were killed in the collapse of an air raid shelter in Via Leopardi, hit by a bomb.

A further two raids took place in late 1943; on 1 October, three or four bombers of the 12th Air Force, having failed to reach their primary objective at Wiener Neustadt, attacked the marshalling yard of Bologna, but their bombs fell on the city, causing some damage and ten casualties. Four days later, a far heavier attack was carried out by 124 B-17s of the 12th Air Force (out of 139 that had originally taken off), which dropped 365 tons against the marshalling yard. The bombs, besides hitting the objective (the central station was almost completely destroyed), also hit the Cirenaica district (spared by the previous air raids), the Porta San Felice and Porta Lame areas and the headquarters of Resto del Carlino; 144 buildings were completely destroyed, 218 were partially destroyed and 164 damaged, with about eighty victims among the civilians.

By the late autumn of 1943, about 120,000 of Bologna's 318,000 inhabitants had left the city.

=== 1944 ===
The first raid of 1944 took place on 29 January, by thirty-nine B-17s of the 15th Air Force that had taken off from Cerignola; their objective had been Prato, but bad weather forced them to abort this mission, and the Bologna marshalling yards were chosen as secondary target. Many of the 117 tons of bombs dropped in this raid missed the objective and fell on the city, within a radium of two kilometres, destroying completely 105 buildings, destroying partially 154 and causing damage to another 118; 31 people were killed and 47 wounded. The Archiginnasio was partially destroyed.

Another raid was carried out on 22 March by 88 Consolidated B-24 Liberator bombers of the 15th Air Force (out of 134 that had originally taken off), which dropped 224 tons of bombs on Bologna's marshalling yard; once more many bombs fell on the city, destroying completely 70 buildings, destroying partially 130, damaging 300 and causing about two hundred civilian dead (many of whom in the Via Leopardi air aid shelter, hit again by a bomb and partially collapsed like on 25 September) and 110 wounded. On 7 April, 130 or 200 bombers of the 15th Air Force dropped 240 tons of bombs on the San Donato marshalling yard; the target was hit, but many bombs also fell on the outskirts of the city, hitting 100 buildings (30 completely destroyed, 30 partially destroyed, 40 damaged) and causing 51 dead and 52 wounded.

The following three raids caused little damage and a dozen victims: on 30 April, by 100 bombers; on 2 May, by 70 bombers; on 12 May, by a single bomber. On 13 May, instead, Bologna was attacked by 200 bombers of the 15th Air Force (that had taken off from San Giovanni in Fiore), which dropped 380 tons of bombs on the central station and the San Donato and San Ruffillo marshalling yards; again the bombs hit both the targets and the city, causing damage to 105 buildings (31 destroyed completely, 31 partially destroyed, 45 damaged) and causing over a hundred dead and 220 wounded among the civilians.

On 19 May, Bologna's marshalling yard were attacked by a hundred bombers of the 15th Air Force; 34 buildings were hit (16 completely destroyed, 6 partially destroyed, 12 damaged), with 47 dead and 10 wounded. On 5 June 76 American bombers took off from Lecce and dropped 170 tons of bombs on the marshalling yards; this raid was judged as accurate by American reports, but part of the bombs again hit the city, especially Borgo San Pietro, destroying completely 49 buildings, partially another 23, causing damage to a further 28 and causing twelve dead and seven wounded. A B-24 was shot down by the Flak. On 22 June 65 B-17s and B-24s of the 15th Air Force dropped 130 tons of bombs on the marshalling yard, but once again many of the bombs fell on the city (especially the historic centre and the Arcoveggio district) destroying completely 51 buildings, destroying partially 68, causing damage to 79 and killing twenty people.

Minor attacks, which caused light damage, took place on 26 June (22 dead and 23 wounded), 5 July (five dead and one wounded), 21 July (nine wounded), 24 July (three dead), 29 July (three dead and eight wounded), 7 August, 9 August, 16 August, 22 August (three deaths) and 23 August. On 24 August 76 bombers of the Royal Air Force dropped 190 tons of bombs on the marshalling yard; again the bombs hit the city was well, especially the Sant’Orsola and Bolognina districts, leveling 48 buildings, destroying partially 46 and causing damage to 142. Victims were about one hundred. Minor raids followed on 25, 26, 27, 28 and 31 August.

On 1 September 75 RAF bombers dropped 160 tons of bombs on the marshalling yard, hitting both the target and the city, especially the Arcoveggio and Bolognina districts. Seventeen buildings were completely destroyed, 44 were partially destroyed, 52 were damaged; casualties were about one hundred. On 5 September a minor raid caused one death and four wounded, and on the following day 51 British bombers (out of 67 that had taken off; one was shot down) dropped 177 tons of bombs on the marshalling yard, hitting both the objective and the city and causing nine dead and eight wounded. On 12 September 84 RAF bombers dropped 241 tons of bombs on the San Donato marshalling yard, hitting again both the target and the city (one victim, four buildings completely destroyed, six partially destroyed, twenty-one damaged). Two minor air raids took place on 13 and 14 September. In the September raids, the RAF made use of 4,000-lb blockbuster bombs; these attacks also saw the participation of Free French fighter-bombers.

On 16 September, 120 bombers of the 12th Air Force attacked the marshalling yard, but most of the bombs fell on the city, especially the northern suburbs; 72 buildings suffered damage (14 were destroyed completely, 13 destroyed partially, 45 damaged) and 59 civilians lost their lives, with eighteen wounded. On the following day, another attack by thirty bombers caused seven dead, six wounded, the complete destruction of six buildings, the partial destruction of twelve and damag to another six; on 18 September a raid by ten bombers caused one victim. Minor attacks followed on 23, 24 (eight dead and four wounded), 26 and 27 September (three victims) and 3 October; on 4 October, as Allied troops gradually advanced northwards, Bologna was shelled for the first time by American artillery. A “Long Tom” shell struck the Palazzo del Podestà.

On October 11, 123 Martin B-26 Marauder bombers of the 12th Air Force dropped 700 bombs on an ammunition depot located inside the city, hitting both the objective and the city itself; 37 buildings were destroyed totally or partially, 21 citizens were killed and 23 wounded. On the following day, 12 October, Bologna suffered the heaviest raid in the entire war: called “Operation Pancake”, this raid was carried out by 698 B-17, B-24 and B-26 bombers of the 12th and 15th Air Forces, which took off from the Foggia airfields and were escorted by 160 Lockheed P-38 Lightning and Republic P-47 Thunderbolt fighters. They dropped 1,294 tons of bombs (the heaviest bomb tonnage dropped on an Italian city in a single raid during the entire war) on fuel and ammunition dumps, depots and German troop concentrations located in various places in the city, as well as on the Ducati plant – now engaged in munitions production, it was completely knocked out by this raid –, on the Borgo Panigale airfield and on the bridges on the Reno. The purpose of this raid was to weaken German forces in Bologna and its surroundings in order to support the advance by the Fifth Army, aimed at capturing the city before Christmas. Once again, many of the bombs fell on the entire city; this was the most destructive air raid suffered by Bologna, with 402 buildings completely destroyed and 845 partially destroyed. Estimates of civilian losses vary between three hundred and six hundred.

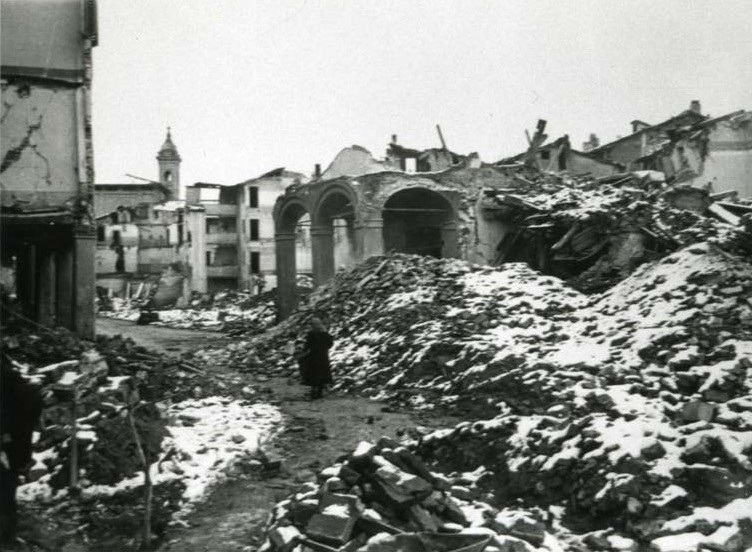
Ruins near Via Lame, one of the most damaged areas of Bologna, in the winter of 1944-1945

After this devastating raid, most of the remaining population left Bologna; future mayor Giuseppe Dozza would describe in his memoirs the Bologna of late 1944 as a dead city: "Bologna strangely appeared as a dead city to the citizen who had been born in it more than forty years earlier. (…) That incredible silence and the absence of men were oppressive and unbearable. The scenes of Wells's novel on the war in the year 2000 came to mind". Tens of thousands of evacuees fled to the surrounding countryside or to the villages on the Bolognese Apennine.

The 12 October raid was the last major raid suffered by Bologna during 1944; in the final months of the year, the city was only subjective to minor raids (on 13, 14, 15, 21, 24 and 30 October, 6, 11 and 22 November, 1, 10, 14, 18, 21, 22, 25, 26, 27, 28, 29, 30 and 31 December). The dwindling intensity of air raids on the city, along with the movement of the frontline, with the Gothic Line turning the Bolognese Apennine into a battlefield, reversed the evacuee situation; most of the people that had left Bologna during the previous months returned to the city (whose historic centre had been declared "Sperrzone", area where military traffic was interdicted, by the German command), and along with them came tens of thousands of inhabitants of the Apennine villages, fleeing the fighting that was now ravaging their valleys. As a consequence of this, in the winter of 1944-1945 the population of Bologna nearly doubled from that of 1940; between residents and Apennine refugees, some 600,000 people were now living in the city. Many of the Apennine farmers brought their livestock with them; the ruins of the Neoclassic Teatro del Corso were turned into stables and haylofts, as were other buildings. In order to house the refugees and the homeless, the Municipal Assistance Authority requisitioned 11,450 apartments and built collective accommodation for 60,000 people, but these measures weren't enough; many camped amid the ruins of destroyed buildings.

=== 1945 ===
On 5 and 12 January, strafing attacks took place; on 16 and 17 January minor night attacks were carried out, causing twenty deaths and six wounded on 17 January. On 22 January another strafing attack took place, followed by further minor attacks on 23 and 25 January. More strafing and minor attacks took place on 4, 5, 6 and 8 February, 2, 8, 10, 21 and 22 March (on 8, 10 and 21 March there were six, two and four victims, respectively), 3 and 8 April. On 15 April, after the beginning of the final Allied offensive, 831 American fighter-bombers and bombers dropped 1,580 tons of bombs, most of them fragmentation bombs, on German positions in the surroundings of Bologna; some of the bombs fell on the city, killing sixteen civilians and wounding fourteen, and destroying totally 28 buildings and partially 26. These tactical attacks, supporting the Allied advance, continued during the following days: on 16 April 101 American bombers dropped 222 tons of bombs, hitting 76 buildings (25 completely destroyed, 51 partially destroyed) and causing 70 deaths and 30 wounded among the civilians; on 17 April, 750 bombers dropped 1,650 tons of bombs on the surroundings of Bologna, which was not directly hit; on 18 April, 474 bombers dropped 1,086 tons of bombs, some of which fell on Bologna causing 42 victims.

On 19 April a minor attack on Pontevecchio, Borgo Panigale, San Luca and San Michele in Bosco caused four victims; on 20 April another minor attack caused the last civilian casualties of the war in Bologna, nine dead and six wounded. On 21 April 1945, Allied troops entered Bologna; on that day and the following day a few German aircraft dropped some bombs on the city, causing little damage and no casualties. The last air raid alarm ended at seven in the morning of 23 April 1945.

== Damage and casualties ==
Bologna suffered the highest death toll of any Northern Italian city from air raids: 2,481 civilians were killed, 2,074 were wounded.

Damage to housing stock was considerable. Out of 13,400 homes that existed in 1940, 1,336 were completely destroyed (9.7%), 1,582 were partially destroyed (11.9%) and 2,964 were damaged (21.6%). Out of 280,000 rooms, 38,500 were completely destroyed, 16,500 were partially destroyed, and 66,000 damaged; altogether, depending on the source, between 43% and 49% of the city was destroyed or damaged. The hardest hit areas were the ones located along the railway and the Casaralta, Bolognina and “Libia” districts, near Via Lame and the Velodrome, where depots and industrial plants were located; the university district also suffered heavy damage, as did Borgo Panigale and San Ruffillo (where destruction reached 95%). Some areas were completely razed, such as the one surrounding Porta Lame, where the medieval gate is today the only pre-war building left standing. Less serious was the damage to the southern districts. After the war and until the early 1950s, many homeless lived in slums built in various parts of the city, amid the ruins of the Teatro del Corso, in the former Littoriale Stadium, below the portici of San Luca, and in schools and monasteries.

Of the city's industries, the Ducati plant (the biggest factory of Bologna, with over 6,000 workers) was largely destroyed, and heavy damage was likewise suffered by the SABIEM foundry, the Manifattura Tabacchi, the SASIB, the Officine di Casaralta, the Officine Minganti and other smaller factories.

Cultural heritage suffered heavy damage; among the destroyed or badly damaged buildings were the Palazzo del Podestà, Palazzo d'Accursio, Palazzo Ghislieri (never rebuilt), Palazzo Malvezzi Campeggi, Palazzo dei Banchi, Palazzo Bolognini Amorini Salina, the Monastery of Corpus Domini, the Basilica of San Francesco, the Archiginnasio, the churches of San Giorgio in Poggiale, of Santa Maria della Mascarella (completely destroyed and never rebuilt), of San Giovanni in Monte, of the Madonna di Galliera, of Santa Maria della Carità, of San Nicolò di San Felice (deconsecrated and never restored), of Santissimo Salvatore, the Oratory of San Filippo Neri; the Neoclassic Teatro del Corso, after suffering heavy damage, was torn down and never rebuilt. The Cathedral suffered light damage.
