= Malvasia (surname) =

Malvasia is an Italian surname. Notable people with the name include:

- Carlo Cesare Malvasia (1616–1693), Italian scholar and art historian
- Cornelio Malvasia (1603–1664), Italian aristocrat, patron of astronomy and military leader
- Diodata Malvasia (c. 1532 – post-1617), Italian nun within the convent of San Mattia in Bologna

== See also ==
- Malvasia
