= San Barbaziano, Bologna =

Church in Bologna, Italy

Coordinates: 44.4923°N 11.3378°E

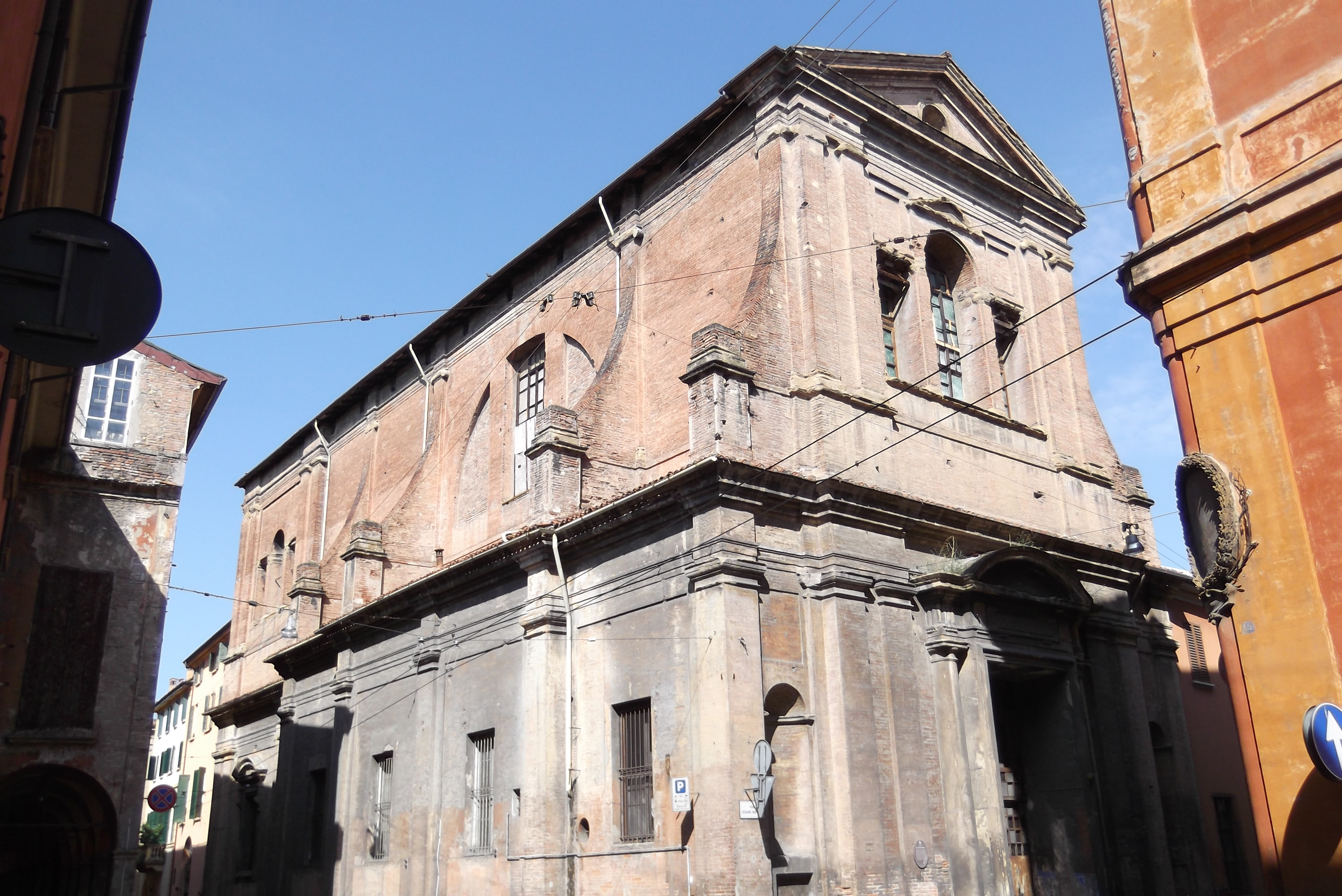
Former church of San Barbaziano, Bologna, Italy

San Barbaziano is a former Mannerist-style, Roman Catholic church located on via Cesare Battisti, 35 in central Bologna, region of Emilia-Romagna, Italy. It was dedicated to Saint Barbatianus.

== History ==
Some sources claim a church at the site since the 5th century. A monastery was present by 1123. Priests from the Order of Canons Regular of the Lateran were officiating by 1480.

Reconstruction was commissioned in the early 17th century by the Girolamini order from the architect Pietro Fiorini, and construction proceeded from 1608 to 1618 for the church and the adjacent convent. The church has a single nave with four chapels. In 1797, the convent was suppressed and in 1806 the church was closed. All the artwork has been removed.

Prior to deconsecration the church had artworks by Errico Fiammingo, Giuseppe Monticelli, Lonardino, Giovanni Pietro Possenti, Giacomo Francia, Alessandro Mari, Girolamo Curti (il Dentone), Giovanni Battista Ruggieri and others. The chapels were sponsored by the Laghi, Palmieri, Banzi Melini, Sacchi, and Zambezzari families.
