= Palazzo Dondini Ghiselli, Bologna =

The Palazzo Dondini Ghiselli is a Neoclassical-style palace located on Via Barberia #23, corner with Via Mario Finzi, in central Bologna, region of Emilia-Romagna, Italy.

== History ==
The palace was designed by Alfonso Torreggiani; with a facade completed in 1753. In 1773, the grand entry staircase was built by Giangiacomo Dotti, with statues by Antonio Schiassi and a fresco of the Aurora by Pietro Fabri. The elevated garden behind the Via Barberia facade, and overlooking the Piazza Malpighi was once a stable built in 1612 by Pietro Fiorini.

The palace once had landscape frescoes by Vincenzo Martinelli and quadratura by Petronio Fancelli.
