= Baldassare Aloisi =

Italian painter

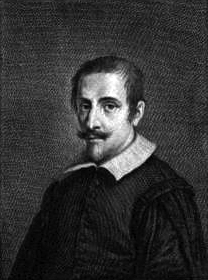
Baldassare Aloisi, Il Galanino.

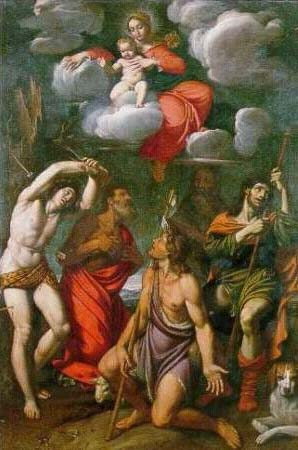
Madonna col Bambino in gloria e i santi Sebastiano, Girolamo, Giovanni Battista, Pietro Eremita e Rocco, 1608.

Baldassare Aloisi, or Baldassare Galanino (12 October 1578 – 1638), was an Italian history and portrait painter and engraver. He was also known as Il Galanino.

Aloisi was born at Bologna, the relative and pupil of Ludovico Carracci.

As his compositions were not meeting with sufficient encouragement, he went to Rome, and gave himself up to portrait painting. His pictures have great vigor and clarity of relief. He also made picturesque engravings, but his works in this manner are carried out with a little too much negligence.

One of his finest pictures is The Visitation, in the first chapel of the church Santa Maria della Carità in Bologna. He was in Rome, and much employed in painting portraits of the most illustrious persons of his time. For the churches he also painted some pictures, the principal one of which was the great altar-piece representing The Coronation of the Virgin, in the Gesù e Maria. Among his engravings are fifty plates from Raphael's works in the Logge Vaticane, in the Vatican.

His mother, Elena Zenzanini, was a cousin of Agostino and Annibale Carracci. Aloisi had two sons, Vito Andrea and Gioseffe Carlo, both painters.

Bartsch et al.'s Le peintre graveur lists over fifty of his works.
