= Sant'Isaia =

Roman Catholic church in Bologna, Italy

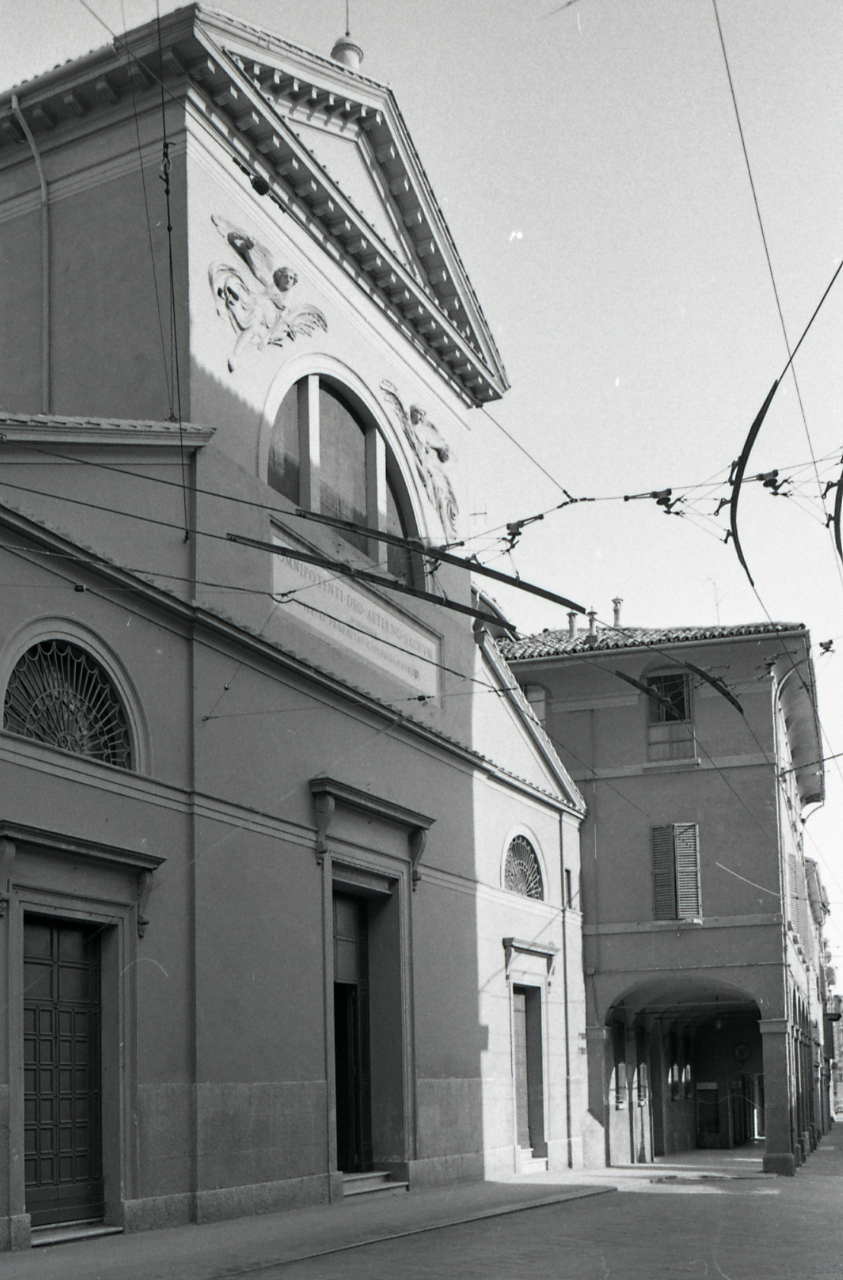
Facade, 1970

Sant'Isaia is a Roman Catholic church located at the intersection of via Sant'Isaia and via De' Marchi in Bologna, region of Emilia-Romagna, Italy. The church is dedicated to the prophet Isaiah.

== History ==
Legend states that it originated in the 1st century, but the first documentary record of it dates to 1088, at which time it was outside the city walls. It became the centre of its district and by 1223 was a gathering-place for musters of soldiers. For a time at the end of the 14th century it housed Dominican nuns after the destruction of their monastery outside the walls - they later built and moved to the nearby San Mattia complex. The church was rebuilt between 1624 and 1633 to designs by Pietro Fiorini, including a side portico and a new internal layout. His son Sebastiano took over the works in 1629 on his father's death.

Luigi Marchesini (1796-1882) radically altered the church, adding two side aisles to the nave, a cupola and a large chapel as well as rebuilding the facade in Neoclassical fashion as a side portico. It reopened for worship on 5 July 1837.

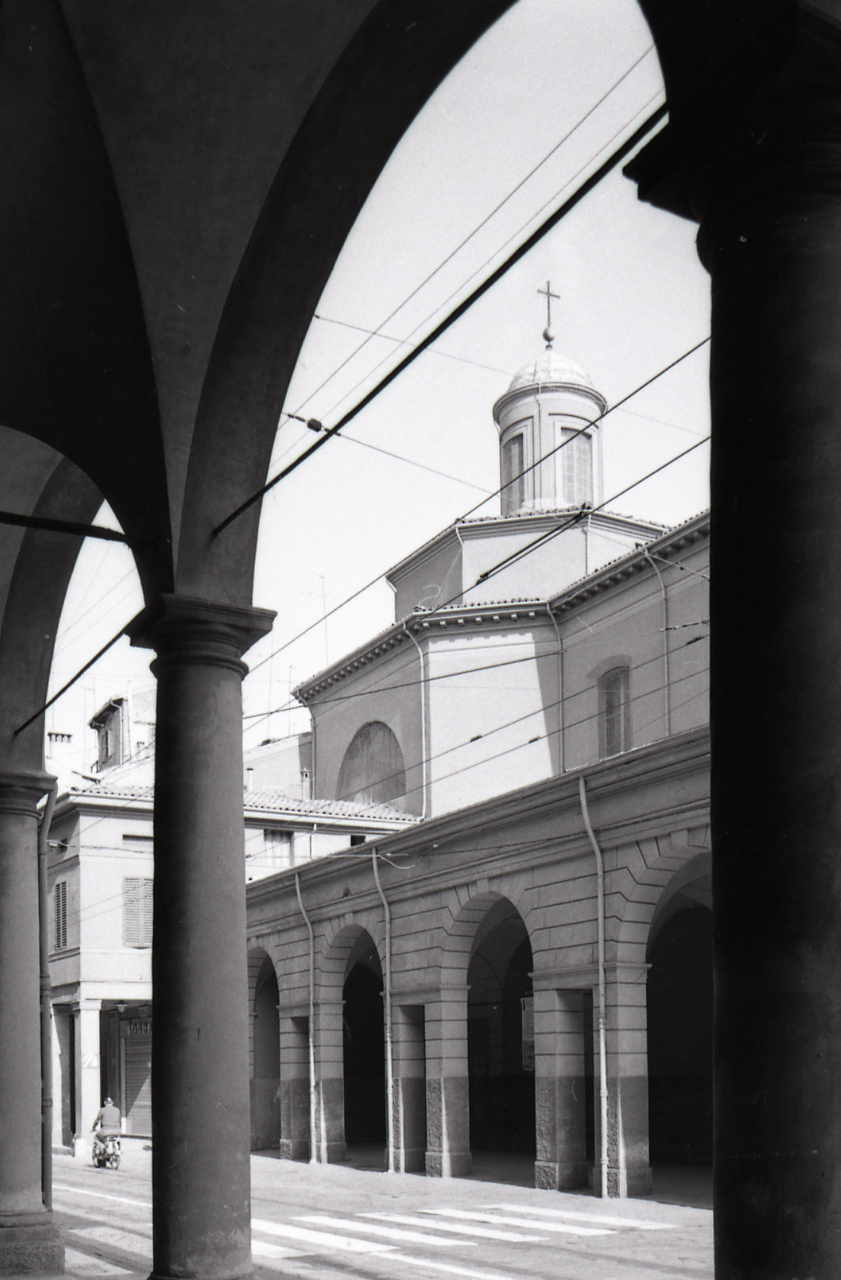
View from the street, 1970.

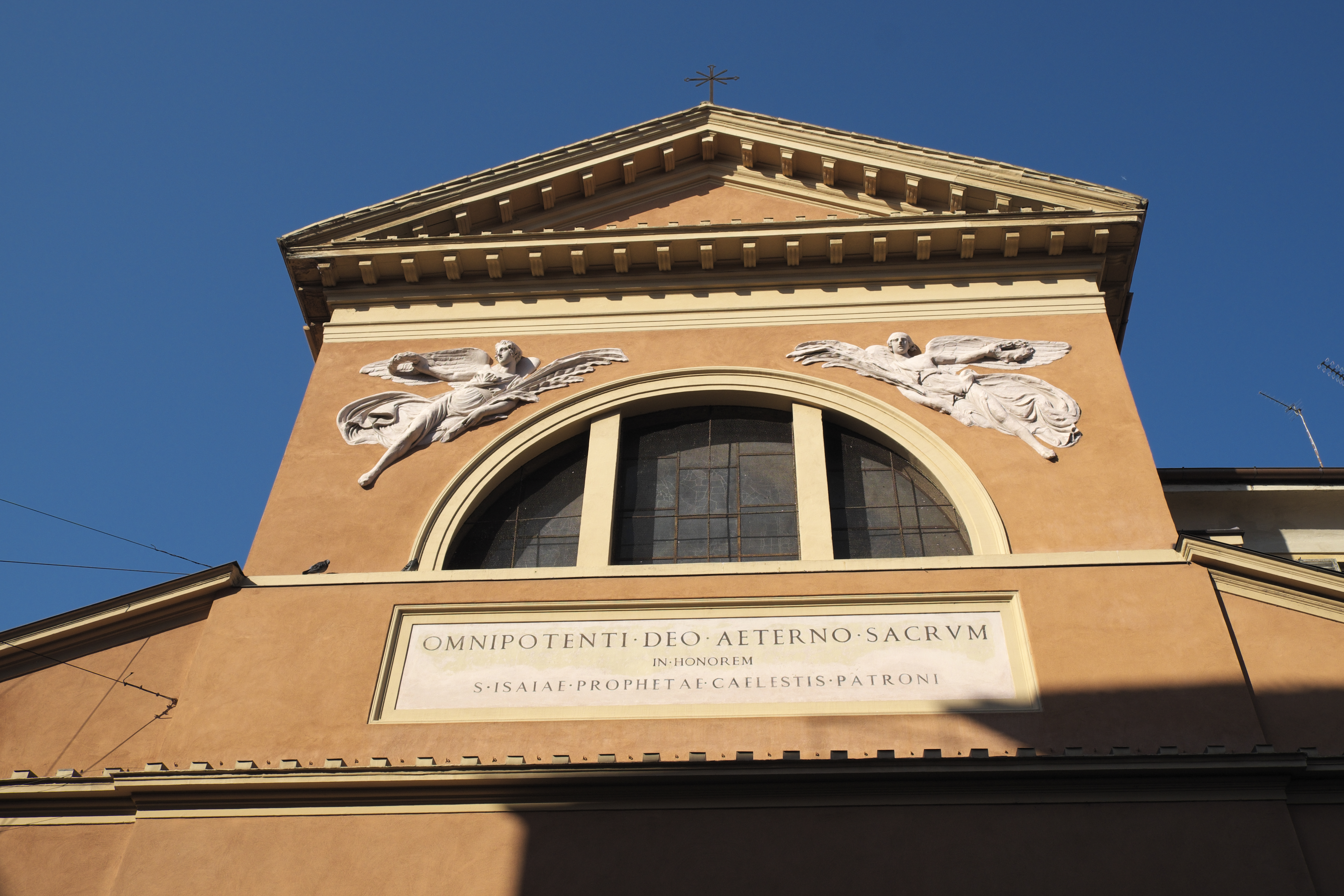
Detail
