= Diodata Malvasia =

Diodata Malvasia (c. 1532 - post-1617) was a nun within the convent of San Mattia in Bologna, Italy. She lived during the period of ecclesiastical reform that arose from the Council of Trent. She is known for being a prolific author, having published Brief Discourse on What Occurred to the Most Reverend Sisters of the Joined Convents of San Mattia and San Luca from the year 1573 (1575) and The Arrival and the Miraculous Workings of the Glorious Image of the Virgin Painted by Saint Luke (1617), and for having been involved in other literary works of her time.

== Early life ==
Diodata Malvasia was born sometime in the early 1530s to Count Annibale Malvasia and Giulia Alamandini, making her from noble lineage and from families well represented in the Bolognese senate. Little else is known about her before she professed and became a nun.

=== San Mattia ===
Malvasia professed at San Mattia in 1547, as it was common for noble families to place daughters in convents. She served as subprioress, an official position below that of prioress, of the convent of San Mattia at the time that she signed the dedicatory of her first known work: Brief Discourse on What Occurred to the Most Reverend Sisters of the Joined Convents of San Mattia and San Luca from the year 1573. She would serve as prioress at San Mattia in 1592, 1606, 1611, and 1613 as well.

=== San Luca ===
San Luca was the sister convent of San Mattia, namesake and home to the Madonna of San Luca, the miraculous icon brought to Bologna in the late twelfth century, the subject of Malvasia’s second piece of work, The Arrival and the Miraculous Workings of the Glorious Image of the Virgin Painted by Saint Luke. During the period following the Council of Trent there was a large movement to dissolve convents across Europe, and both San Mattia and San Luca were threatened with this fate. This threat is what prompted Malvasia to create Brief Discourse, collecting letters from the sisters of San Mattia advocating to protect San Luca from being closed and to allow them to keep the Miraculous Madonna. While Malvasia was writing on what was done to keep convents alive during Tridentine reforms, San Luca took up many boarders following the period of the Council of Trent. Part of the Reformation brought on by the Council of Trent was also a movement for more education, and for both sexes. However, a place to teach girls separate from boys was needed, and here the convents stepped in, finding a way to keep themselves useful to society and to remain open. These boarders likely would eventually carry on the tradition of San Luca and San Mattia, and are certainly part of the audience who Malvasia wrote her works for.

== Works ==
Malvasia is one of only a few of published women in the post-Tridentine era. While some former nuns joined the pamphlet propaganda against convents defending their decisions, Malvasia instead presents the perspective of a woman who chose to remain within the convent and who worked with her sisters to keep their way of life.

Her first piece was entitled A Brief Discourse on What Occurred to the Most Reverend Sisters of the Joined Convents of San Mattia and San Luca from the year 1573. It is a chronicle that recounts the campaign Malvasia waged with her sisters against the enactment of proposed ecclesiastical reform that arose in the period following the Council of Trent: in this case, forced enclosure and seizure of their preternatural Marian icon.

In A Brief Discourse Malvasia gives commentary and provides letters written by nuns to many illustrious officials, including Lord Filippo Guastavillani, and the Pope himself, Pope Gregory XIII. Her introduction to the piece claims that she is writing this and bringing these letters together not only as a historical document, but as a way to instruct nuns in the future should they ever face tribulations, as she states:

“And so that this truth might appear even more clearly, I resolve to put down on paper in readable form all of our actions: not for you, who were present, but for you who will come after us, so that they might see clearly and touch with their hands our travails and our blessings, and the manner in which we helped ourselves.”

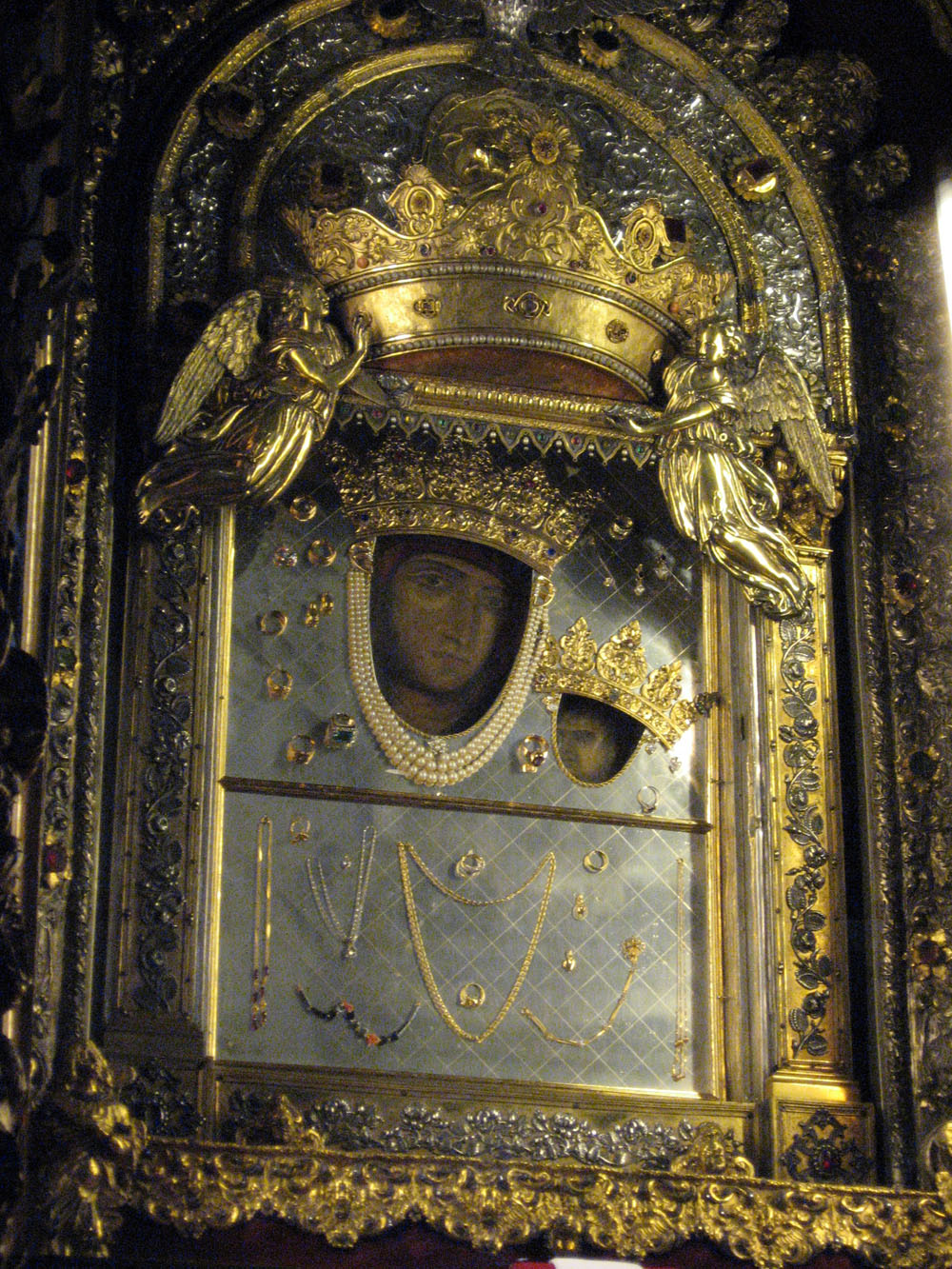
The Madonna of San Luca, subject of The Arrival

The Arrival and the Miraculous Workings of the Glorious Image of the Virgin Painted by Saint Luke: relates the miracles performed by the Madonna of San Luca, a painting attributed to the Evangelist and held in custodianship by the nuns of Malvasia’s convent. Published in 1617, this work is what made Malvasia join a tradition of religious women who had played a role in Italy’s literary canon. In The Arrival Malvasia does not hesitate to directly link her sisters’ own history with that of the Madonna, which can be seen as a way for her to relate the modern day struggles of nuns to the hardships faced by figures in legends and myths of the church. There were many copies of The Arrival found in Italy, which suggests that her published work had a fairly impressive print run and might well have enjoyed a substantial circulation. Within The Arrival there are also examples of Malvasia’s poetry, most of which is Marian verse - verse that exemplified Mary's role and held her up as dignifying womankind - as was common for female poets of this time.

Malvasia is also thought to be involved in the 1579 reprint and expansion of the most famous history of the Madonna of San Luca, L’historia della Madonna San Luca, composed by Leandro Alberti. Published under the title Cronichetta, there is a substantial addition from an unidentified “most reverend religious”. It is thought that this anonymous author may be Malvasia herself. There is also a new dedicatory letter, signed by the prioress and sisters of San Mattia and San Luca. Malvasia may also have been involved in a poetic anthology by the intellectual Ascanip Persio which included Malvasia’s contemporary women writers Chiara Matraini and Lucrezia Marinella. It seems like Malvasia found her way into these projects in an effort to engage them or even reappropriate them for her own purposes in her continued defense of the sisters of San Mattia and San Luca.

In the second edition of Santi Riccetelli’s Chronicle of all that Occurred Regarding the Gloriou Madonna of San Luca of the Monte della Guardia (1574), Malvasia appears again as the text is preceded by a dedicatory letter signed by the sisters of San Mattia and San Luca.

== Bibliography ==
Callegari, Danielle, and Shannon Mchugh. "'Se Fossimo Tante Meretrici': The Rhetoric of Resistance in Diodata Malvasia's Convent Narrative." Italian Studies 66, no. 1 (2011): 21-39.

Cox, Virginia (2011). The Prodigious Muse: Women's Writing in Counter-reformation Italy. Baltimore: Johns Hopkins University Press.

Leonard, Amy (2005). Nails in the Wall. University of Chicago Press. pp. 12–13.

Malvasia, Diodata (2015). Writings on the Sisters of San Luca and Their Miraculous Madonna. Translated by Danielle Callegari and Shannon McHugh. Toronto, Ontario: Iter Academic Press.

Strocchia, Sharon T. "Taken into Custody: Girls and Convent Guardianship in Renaissance Florence." Renaissance Studies 17, no. 2 (2003): 177-200
