= Giardino dei Semplici, Bagnacavallo =

Botanical garden in Italy

Coordinates: 44°25′N 11°59′E

The Giardino dei Semplici is a botanical garden in Bagnacavallo, Province of Ravenna, Emilia-Romagna, central Italy.

The garden was established in 2004 on the former Palazzo Graziani grounds, and currently contains over 300 types of herbs and woody plants. It is divided into four sections and features fruit trees, roses, grasses, legumes, and traditional food plants.

== See also ==
- List of botanical gardens in Italy
