= Flaminio Torri =

Italian painter (1620–1661)

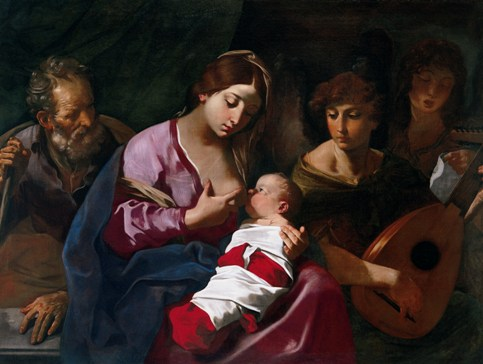
- Flaminio Torri, Holy Family with angel musicians
- Born: 19 May 1620; Bologna, Papal States
- Died: 6 August 1661 (aged 41); Modena, Duchy of Modena and Reggio
- Known for: Painting
- Movement: Bolognese School

Flaminio Torri (19 May 1620 – 6 August 1661) was an Italian Baroque painter of the Bolognese School, active during the Baroque period.

== Biography ==
=== Early life and education ===
He was a pupil of Guido Reni, Giacomo Cavedone, and Simone Cantarini. He inherited the workshop of Contarini in 1648. He was attracted both by the idealizing art of Guido Reni and by the sensual and expressive power that Cantarini had developed. Torri's first works reflect this heritage: they include the Adoration of the Magi (Bologna, San Giuseppe), which in the past has been attributed to Cantarini, the Deposition (Pinacoteca Nazionale di Bologna) and the Vision of St. Anthony in the church of the Osservanza di Imola, both datable to c. 1650. These works are characterized by an emphasis on strong shadows. The altarpiece executed for the Fontana–Bombelli chapel in Santa Maria della Carità, Bologna, has been destroyed, but a vigorous bozzetto survives (Modena, Galleria Estense); the figures are derived from the altarpiece of St. Alo (Pinacoteca Nazionale di Bologna) by Cavedoni, an artist whose originality and modernity Torri admired.

=== Career ===
In 1658 Torri was in Modena, where he worked for Alfonso IV d'Este as superintendent of the Galleria Estense. His curatorial duties included copying the works of other painters, and his study of the art of Mattia Preti, who had worked in Modena (1651–2), encouraged him to develop a weightier naturalism. He also left a considerable number of cabinet paintings, such as the Holy Family and the Ecstasy of St. Francis, which are known in several versions (e.g. Rome, Galleria Pallavicini). Torri died in Modena. Among his pupils were Giulio Cesare Milani, Giovanni Maria Viani, and Alessandro Badile.

== Gallery ==
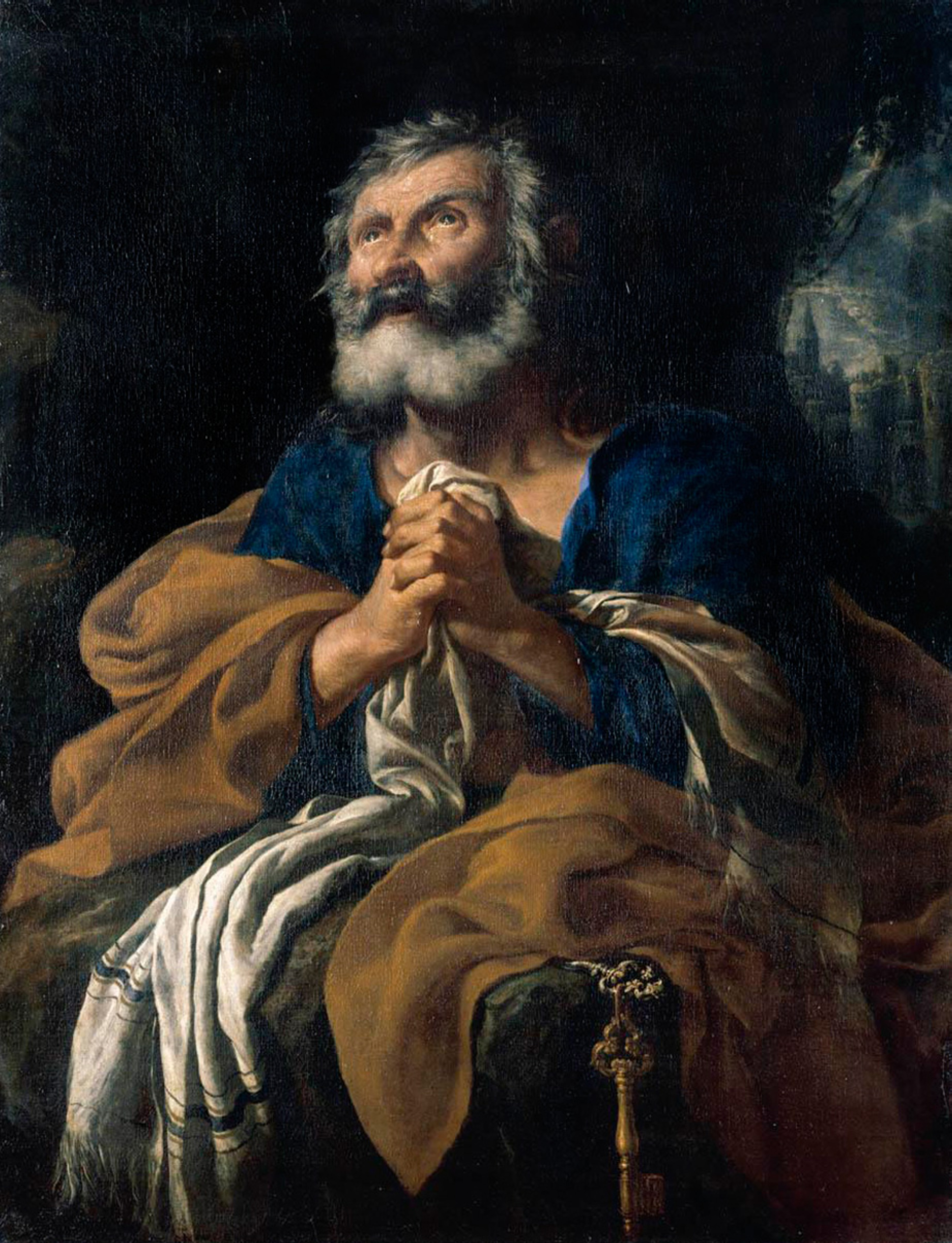
St. Peter in Penitence, Liechtenstein Museum, Vienna

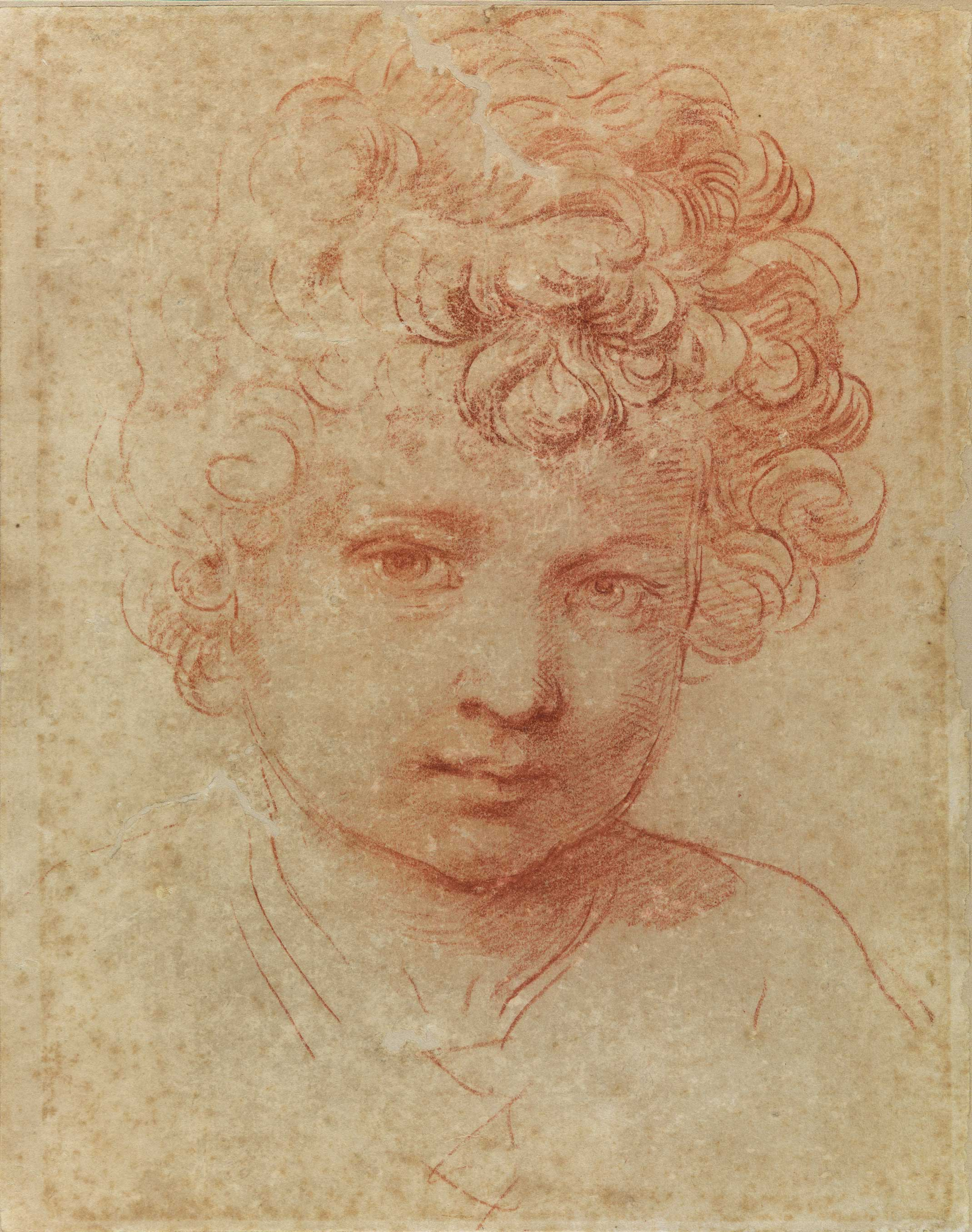
Child's head, National Library of Brazil, Rio de Janeiro

St. Mary Magdalen, Musée des Augustins, Toulouse

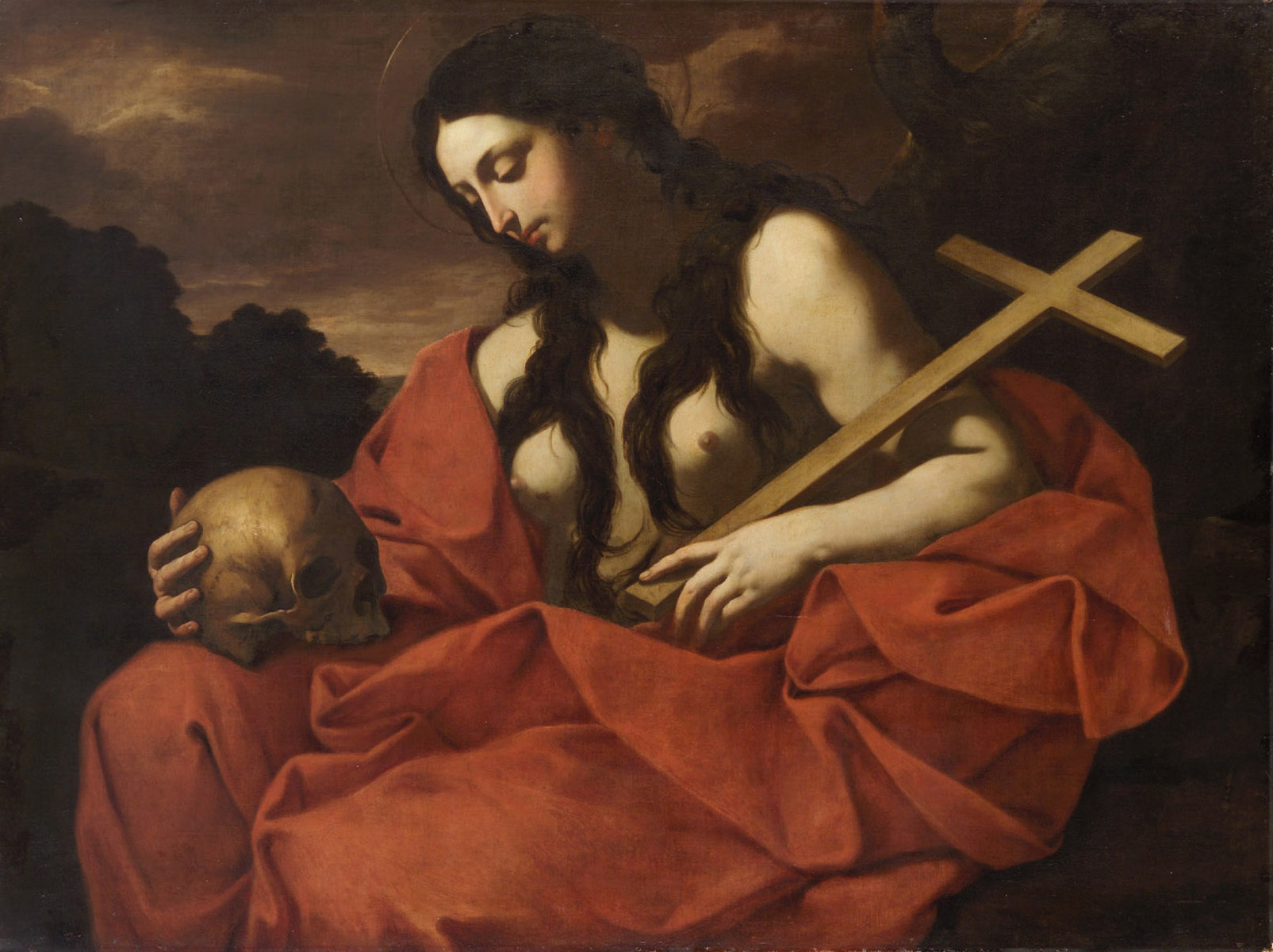
St. Mary Magdalen, Kunsthistorisches Museum, Vienna

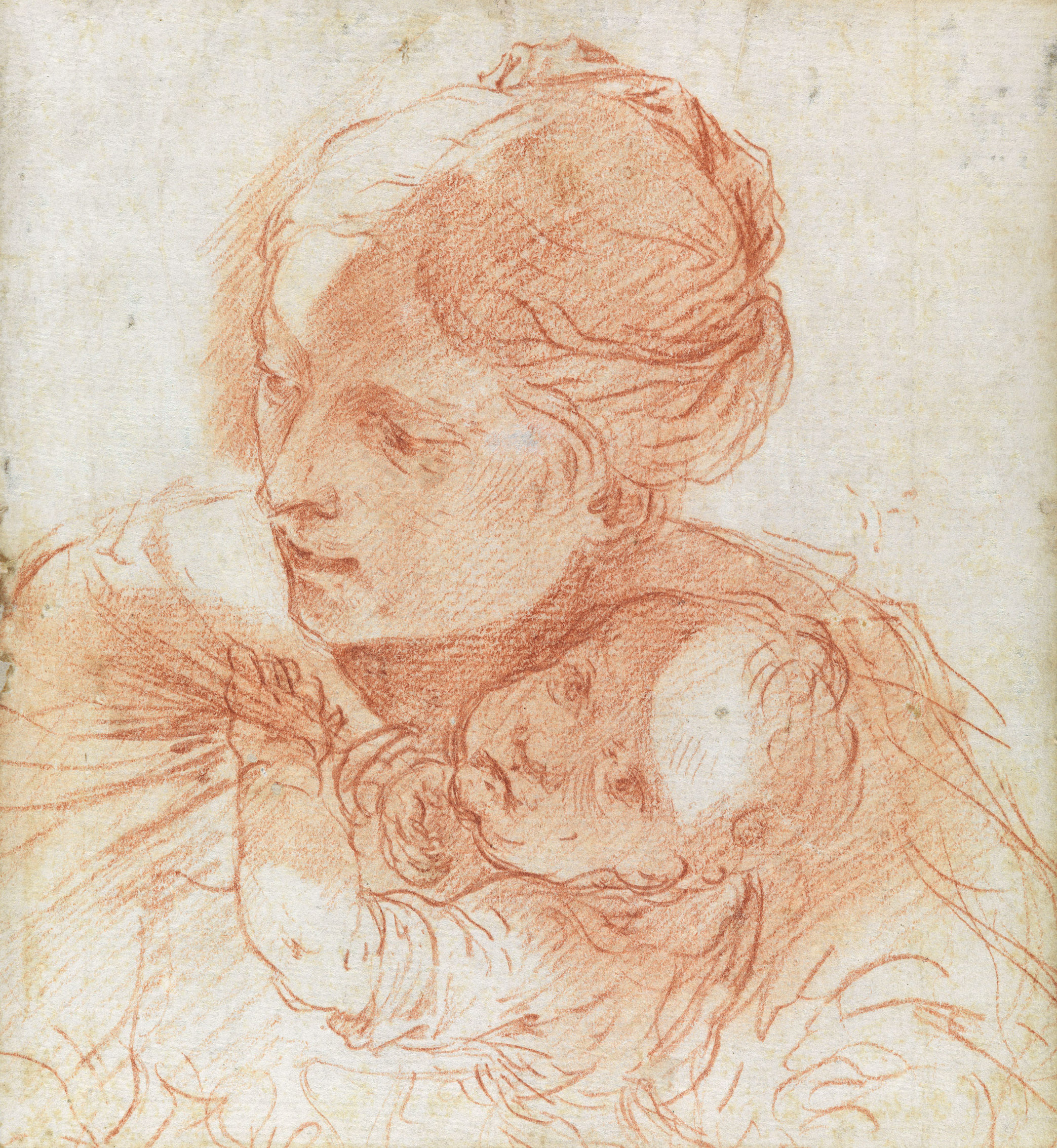
Woman with child on her lap, National Library of Brazil, Rio de Janeiro

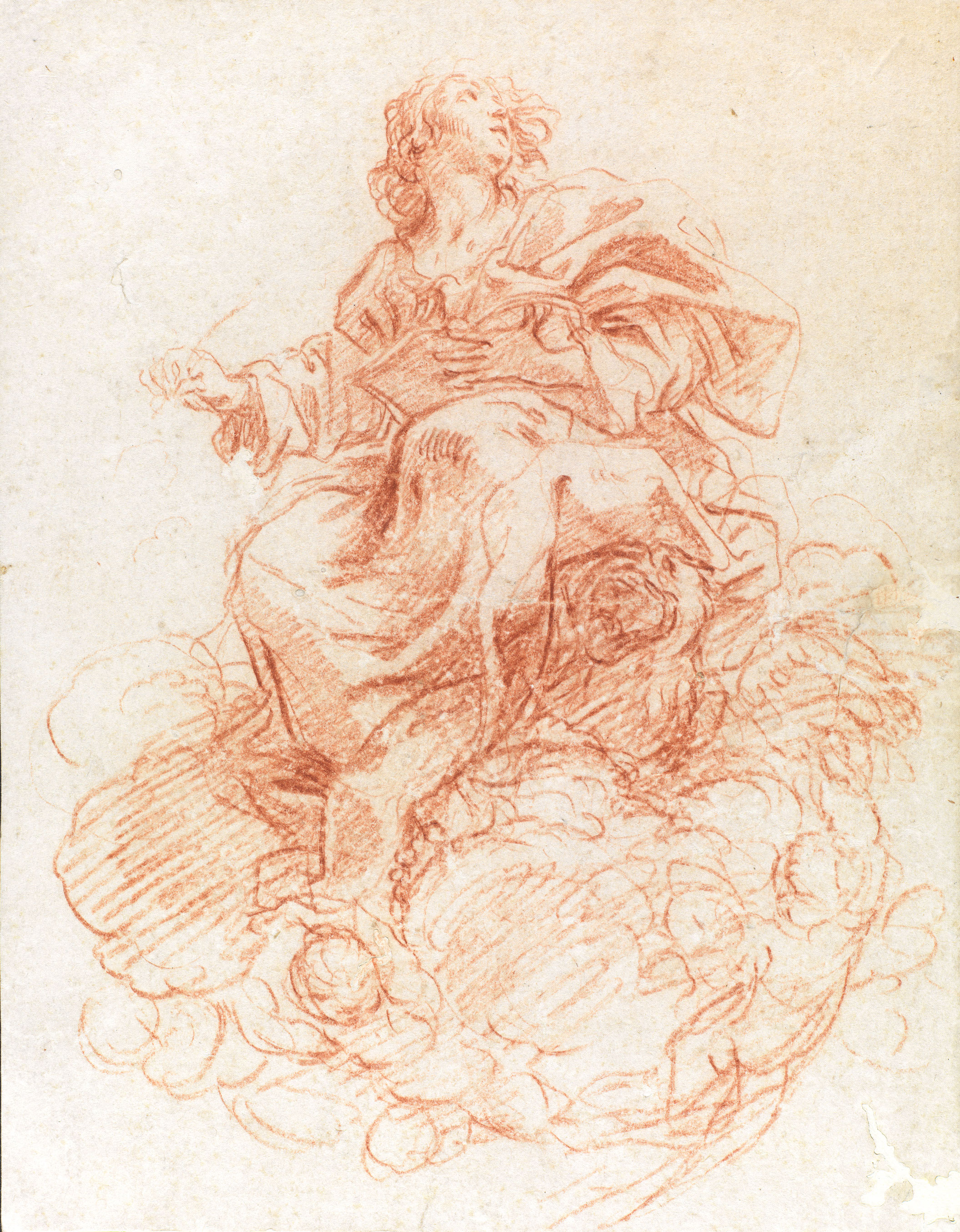
St. John the Evangelist, National Library of Brazil, Rio de Janeiro

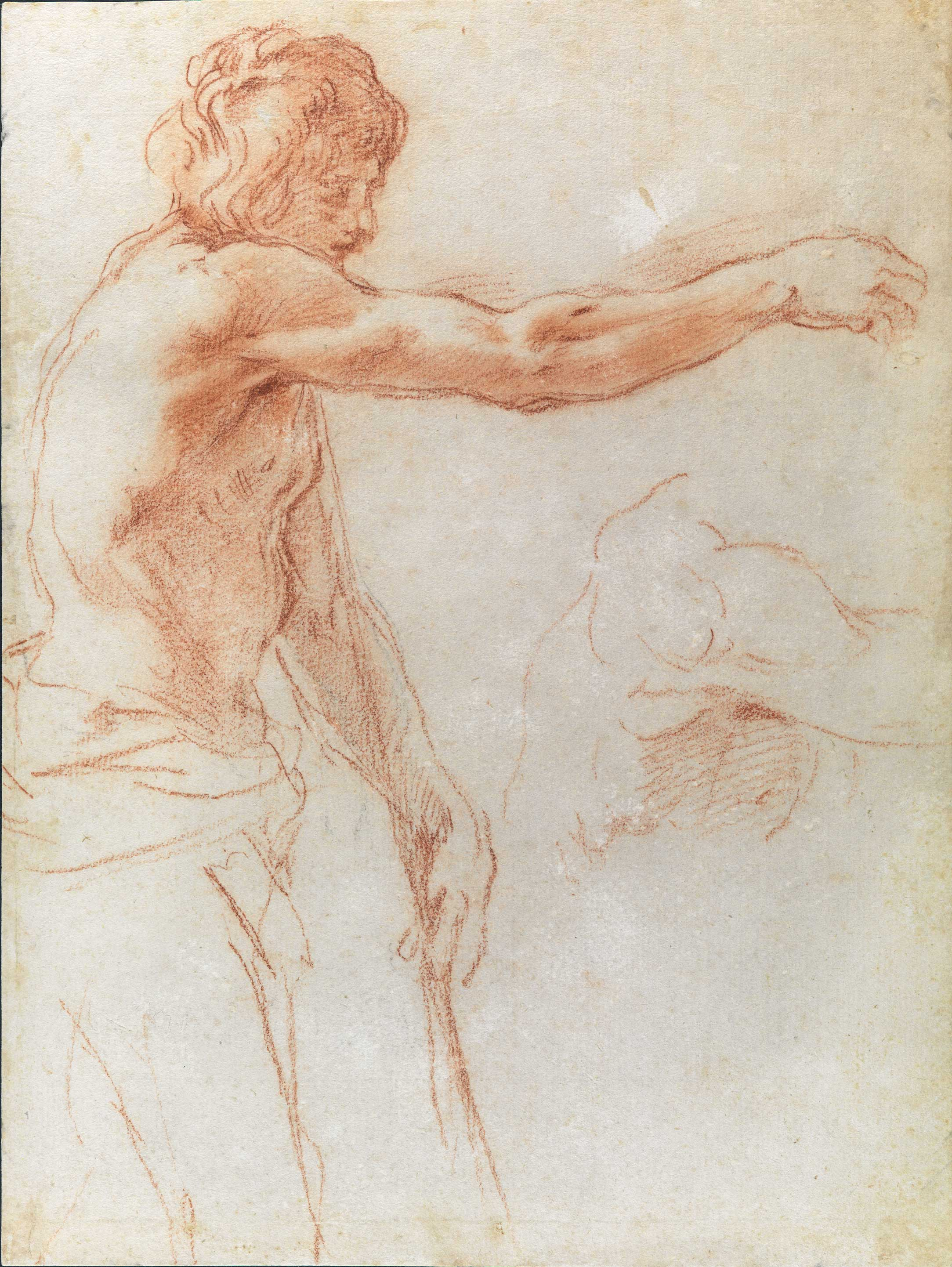
St. John the Baptist, National Library of Brazil, Rio de Janeiro

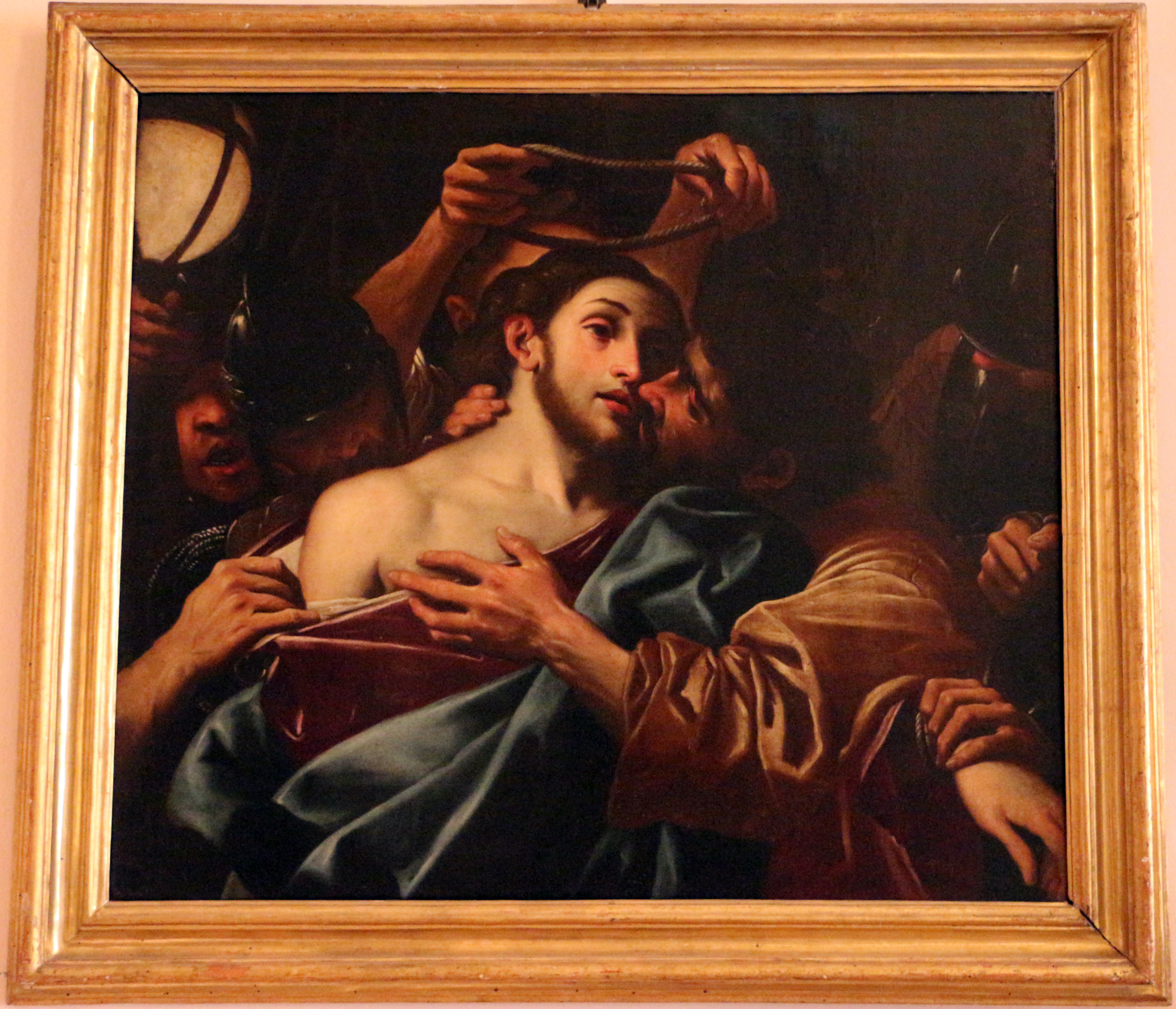
The Taking of Christ, Pinacoteca Nazionale di Bologna

== Bibliography ==
- Ghetti, Enrico (2019). "TORRI, Flaminio". Dizionario Biografico degli Italiani (in Italian). Vol. 96: Toja–Trivelli. Rome: Institute of the Italian Encyclopaedia. ISBN 978-88-12-00032-6.
- Bryan, Michael (1889). Walter Armstrong; Robert Edmund Graves (eds.). Dictionary of Painters and Engravers, Biographical and Critical. Vol. II L-Z. London: George Bell and Sons. p. 580.
