= Alessandro Badiale =

Italian painter (1626–1671)

Alessandro Badiale (1626–1671) was an Italian painter and engraver of the Baroque period, active in Bologna. He was a pupil of Flaminio Torre. Among his etchings are prints of Virgin seated with the Infant Jesus, between St. Philip Neri and St. Anthony of Padua, a Deposition and a Holy Family after Flaminio Torre. He also made a Madonna with Child, who holds a cross and an apple after Cignani.
