= Santa Maria della Carità, Bologna =

Church in Bologna, Italy

Coordinates: 44°29′51″N 11°19′53″E

Santa Maria della Carità is a Renaissance-style Roman Catholic church in central Bologna, Italy.

== History ==
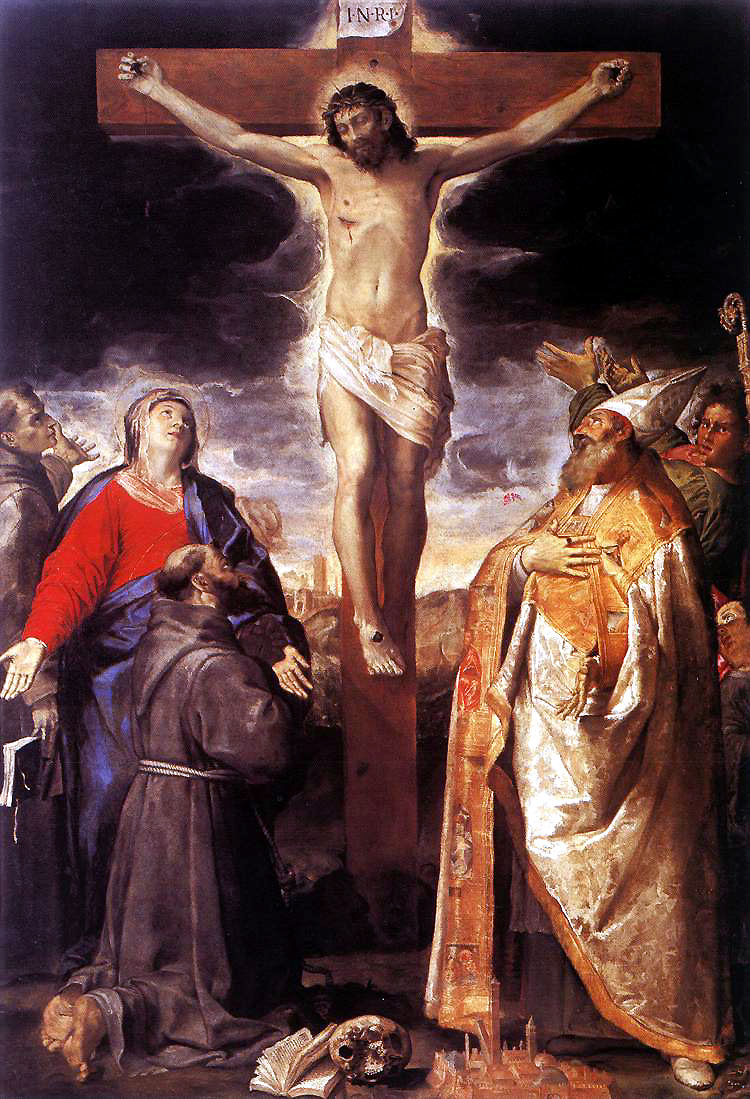
Crucifixion by Annibale Carracci.

By mid-13th century, an administrator under Pope Gregory IX, founded a hospital at an adjacent lot. For a time, it was an orphanage. A chapel, attached to a hospital, existed by 1378. From the 15th to the 18th century, the church and convent were attached to a Franciscan order.

The present layout dates from 1583, by designs of Pietro Fiorini. It was enlarged with the addition of four large chapels in 1680 under the designs of Giovanni Battista Bergonzoni, a Franciscan theologian.

The interior is decorated with paintings by prominent Baroque painters. In the first chapel on the right is a Visitation by Il Galanino. In the 3rd chapel on the right is a Vision of St Elizabeth (1685) by Marc Antonio Franceschini. The third chapel to the left has a Holy Family with St Anthony of Padua(1680) by Felice Cignani. The most prominent work in the church, in the 1st chapel on the left, is the altarpiece depicting the Crucifixion (1583) by a 23-year-old Annibale Carracci. The painting originally was found in the church of San Nicolò di San Felice.

Other artists include Giovanni Valesio; Flaminio Torre (Virgin and Saints); Giovanni Battista Fiorini; Antonio Crespi; Luigi Quaini; and Luigi Crespi. The sacristy, designed also by Bergonzoni, has paintings by Gaetano Gandolfi, Jacopo Alessandro Calvi, and sculptures by Giovanni Francesco Bezzi.
