= San Nicolò di San Felice, Bologna =

Former church in Bologna, Italy

Coordinates: 44°29′48.9″N 11°20′03.0″E

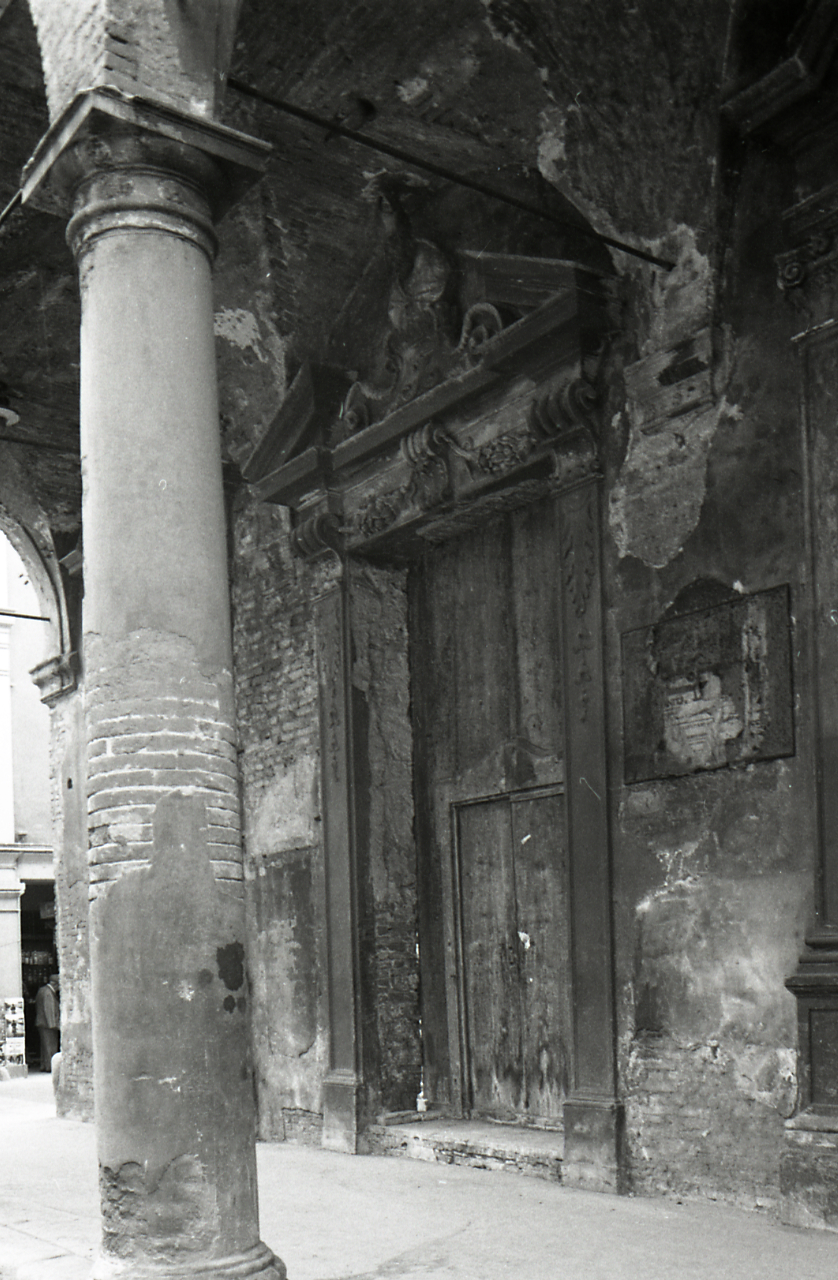
The church portal photographed in 1970 by Paolo Monti

San Nicolò di San Felice is a deconsecrated Roman Catholic church located on via San Felice 41 in Bologna, region of Emilia Romagna, Italy. Bombardment during World War II caused sufficient damage to close the brick walled structure with a front portico.

A church at the site is documented since the 12th century, when it was located outside the city walls. In 1570, the church was refurbished by Pietro Fiorini and included a canvas depicting a Crucifixion by Annibale Carracci, and now displayed at the church of Santa Maria della Carità.

In 1753, a further reconstruction, this time by Carlo Francesco Dotti added an iron cross once located on via San Felice, now also housed in Santa Maria della Carità. The nave has 17th-century stuccos.

== Bibliography ==
- Marcello Fini (2007). Edizioni Pendragon (ed.). Bologna sacra: tutte le chiese in due millenni di storia. Bologna.
