= Bartolomeo Ramenghi =

Italian painter

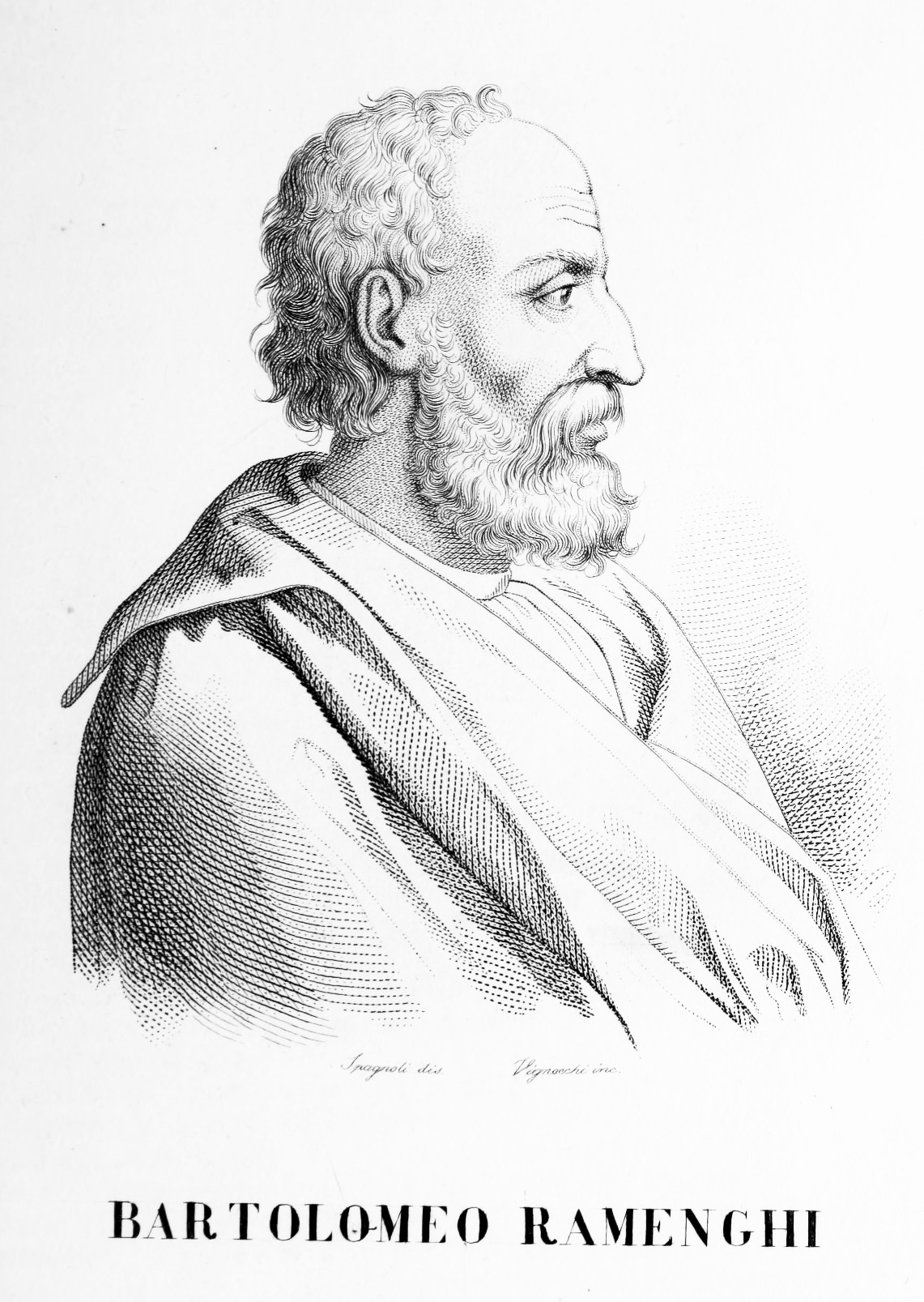

Bartolomeo Ramenghi (1484–1542), also called Bagnacavallo, il Bagnacavallo or il Baruffaldi, was an Italian painter of the Renaissance, active in Emilia-Romagna.

He received the nickname, Bagnacavallo, from the village Bagnacavallo where he was born. He studied first under Francesco Francia and Lorenzo Costa. He then proceeded to Rome, where he became a pupil of Raphael. While studying under him he worked along with many others at the decoration of the gallery in the Vatican, though it is not known which portions are his work.

He became a prominent local artist on his return to Bologna. His works were later highly esteemed by Guido Reni and the Carracci. Among his works made in Bologna were a Dispute of St Augustine and a Madonna and Child.

He died in Bologna. One of his pupils was Cesare Aretusi and another was his own son Giovanni Battista Ramenghi.

== Works ==
- Madonna and Child with Saints Johns the Evangelist and the Baptist; Francis; Clare; Catherine; The Magdalen (1563); The Mystical Marriage of St. Catherine (1543-6) at the Pinacoteca of Bologna.
