= Porta delle Lame, Bologna =

Gate of the former outer medieval walls of Bologna, Italy

Coordinates: 44.50237°N 11.33329°E

Porta delle Lame or Porta Lame was a gate or portal of the former outer medieval walls of the city of Bologna, Italy. It is located at the end of Via Lame, where it meets via Zanardi.

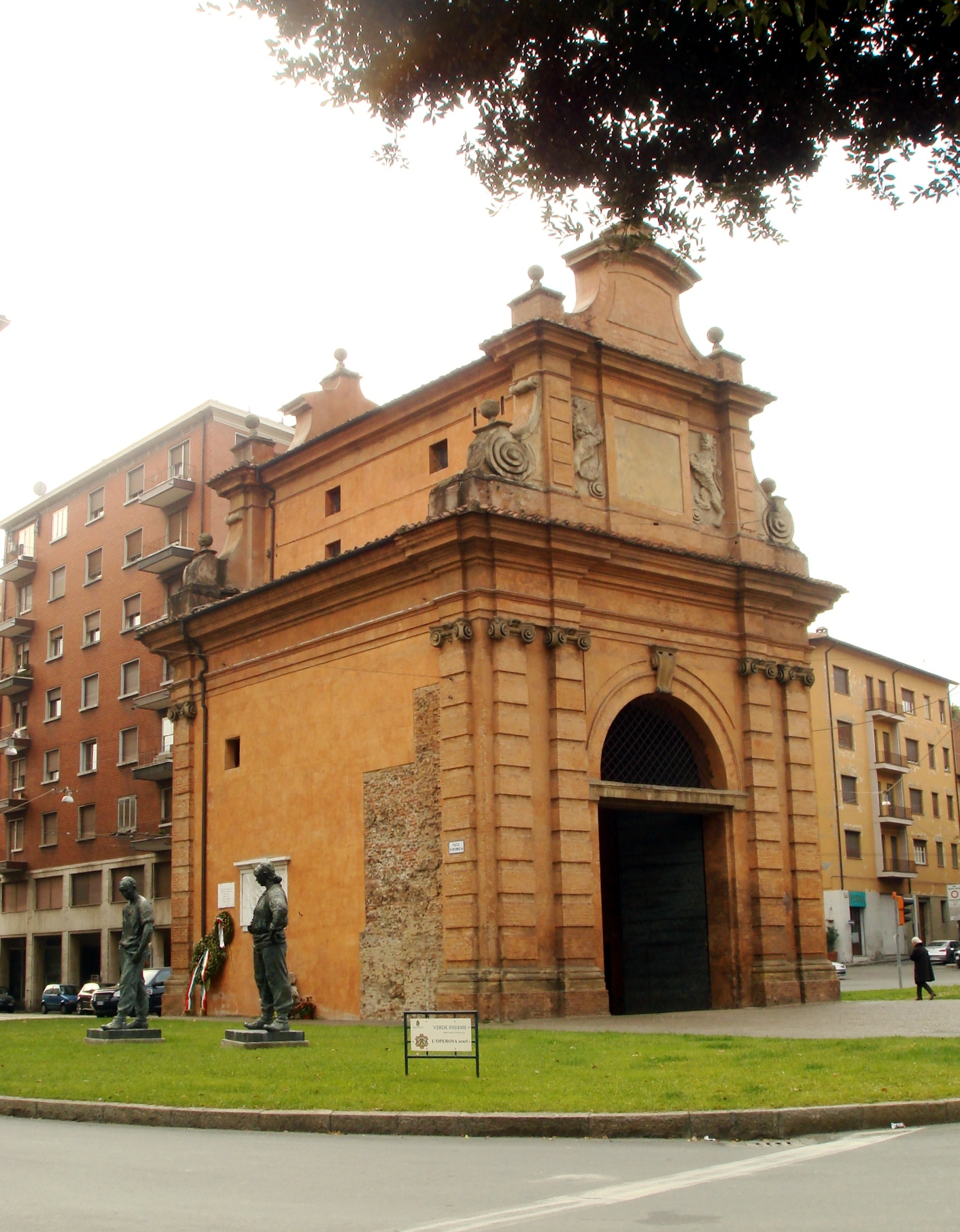
Porta delle Lame

Originally, a gate was built in the medieval walls in 1334, and had two drawbridges, one for carriages, and the other for pedestrians. The gate was rebuilt in 1677 in a Baroque style by the architect Agostino Barelli. The most recent restoration was 2007–2009. Surrounding the gate are bronze statues depicting partisans who fought at this site on November 7, 1944.
