= Bagnacavallo =

- Comune
- Comune di Bagnacavallo
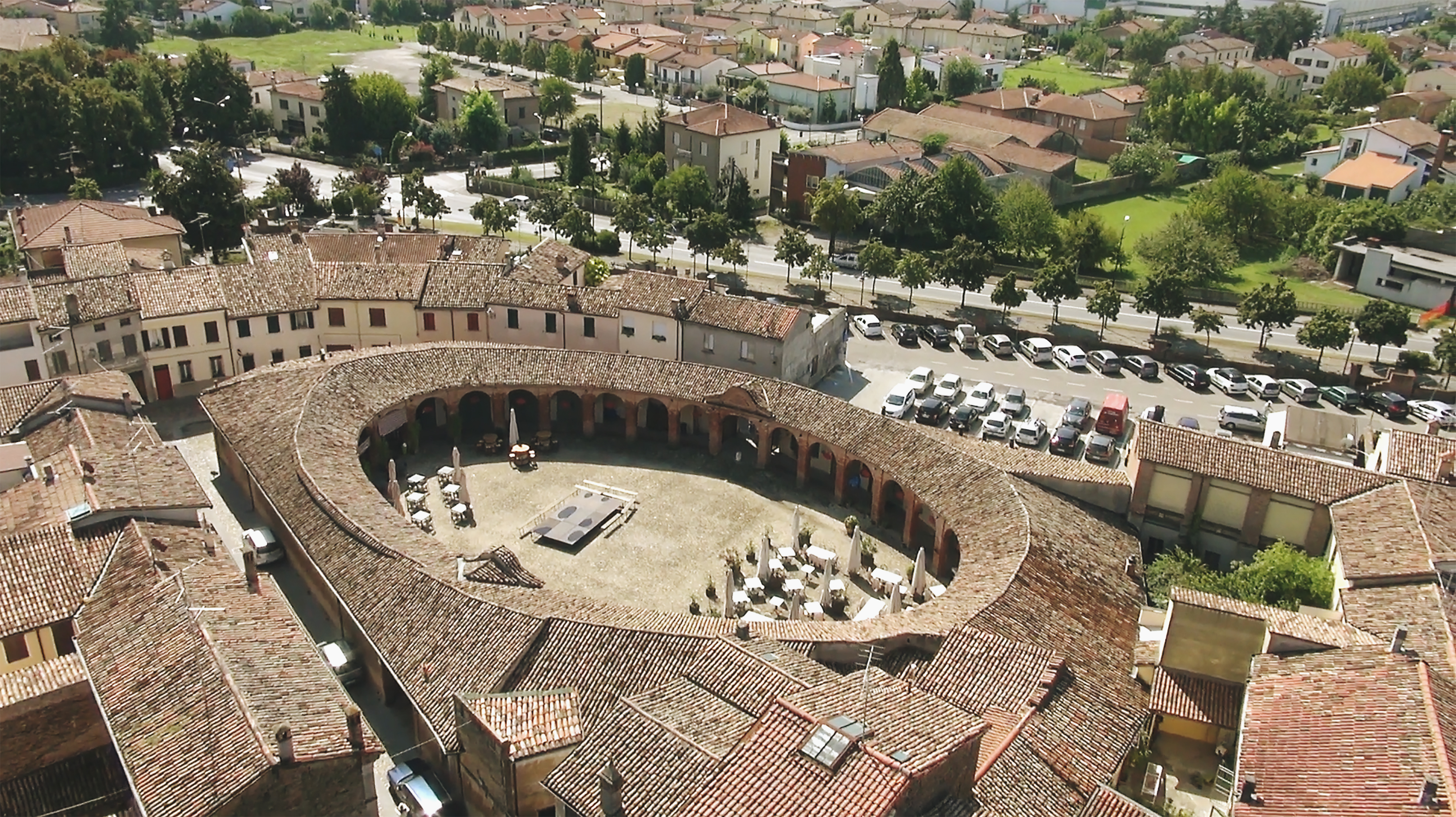
- Piazza Nuova in Bagnacavallo

- Coat of arms

- Location within Italy Location within Emilia-Romagna
- Coordinates: 44°25′N 11°59′E
- Country: Italy
- Region: Emilia-Romagna
- Province: Ravenna (RA)
- Frazioni: Boncellino, Glorie, Masiera, Rossetta, Traversara, Villanova, Villa Prati

Government
  - Mayor: Eleonora Proni (PD)

Area
  - Total: 79.58 km^{2} (30.73 sq mi)
- Elevation: 11 m (36 ft)

Population (30 April 2017)
  - Total: 16,758
  - Density: 210.6/km^{2} (545.4/sq mi)
- Demonym: Bagnacavallesi
- Time zone: UTC+1 (CET)
  - Summer (DST): UTC+2 (CEST)
- Postal code: 48012
- Dialing code: 0545
- Patron saint: Archangel Michael
- Saint day: 29 September
- Website: Official website

Bagnacavallo (Romagnol: Bagnacavàl) is a town and comune in the province of Ravenna, Emilia-Romagna, Italy.

The Renaissance painter Bartolomeo Ramenghi bore the nickname of his native city.

== Main sights ==
- Castellaccio (15th century)
- Giardino dei Semplici
- Podere Pantaleone, a 6-hectare (15-acre) natural preserve
- Pieve of San Pietro in Sylvis (7th century), some 2 kilometres (1.2 mi) west of town
- Piazza della Libertà, the town's main square

== Twin towns and sister cities ==
Bagnacavallo's twin towns and sister cities are:

- Neresheim, Germany, since 1994
- Strzyżów, Poland, since 2006
- Stone, United Kingdom (friendship), since 2004
- Aix-en-Othe, France, since 2012
- (Italy) Pollutri, since 2019 (friendship)
