= Pietro Fiorini =

Italian architect

Pietro Fiorini (1539, Bologna - 1629, Bologna) was an Italian architect. In his youth he studied in Rome, Parma, Florence and Milan, but his most notable works are in his home city, such as the churches of San Mattia, San Nicolò di San Felice, Sant'Isaia and San Barbaziano and the Palazzo Dondini Ghiselli.

Fiorini served as public architect of the Senate from 1583 to 1614.
