= San Mattia, Bologna =

Former church in Bologna, Italy

Coordinates: 44°29′36.0″N 11°20′03.3″E

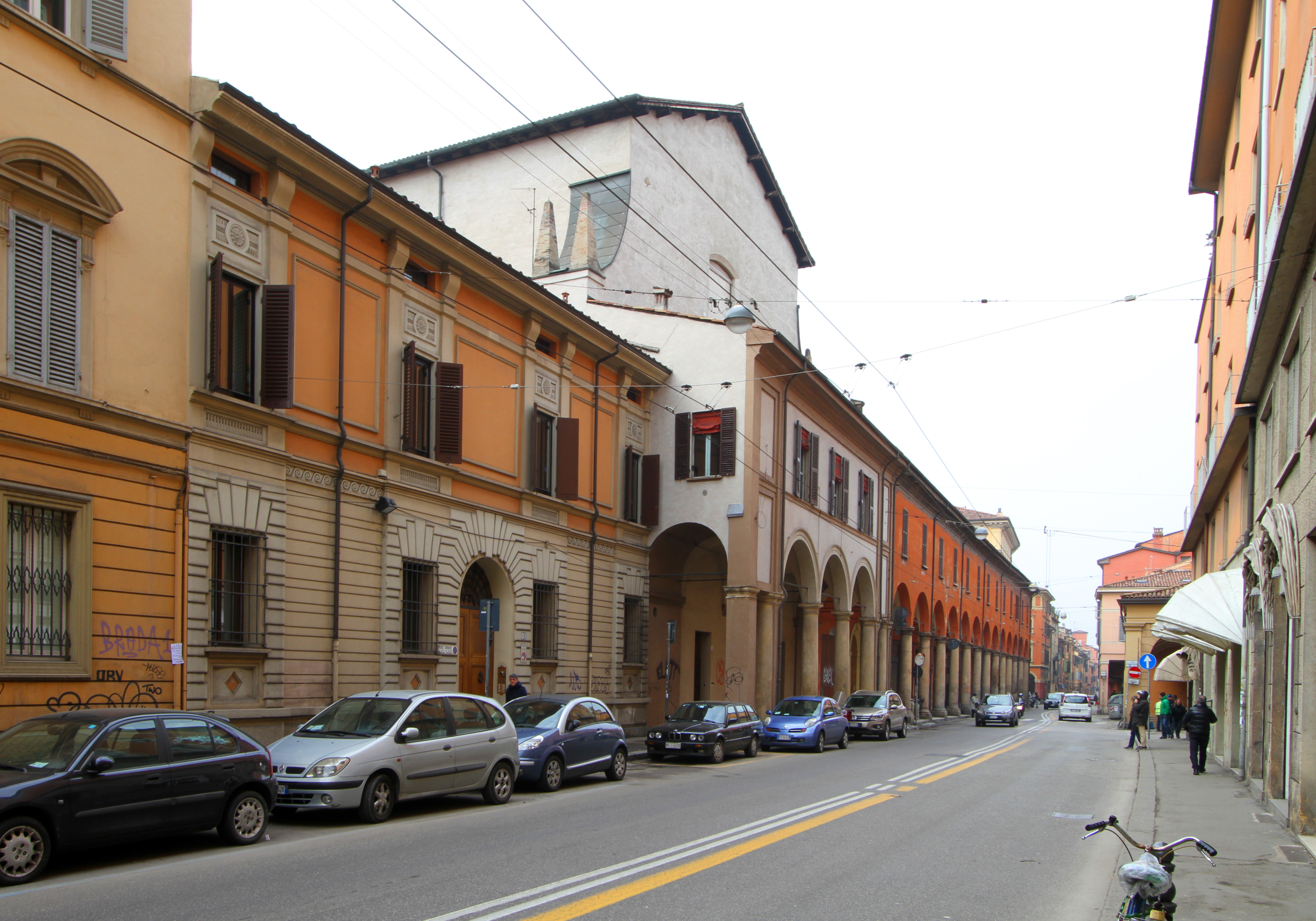

San Mattia was a former Roman Catholic monastery and church located at 14 via Sant'Isaia in Bologna, region of Emilia Romagna, Italy. The church was dedicated to Saint Matthias.

== History ==
An earlier church was built just outside the Porta Saragozza for nuns from the San Mattia convent, a group of nuns originally derived from the Santa Maria del Monte della Guardia, who were guardians of the Basilica of San Luca. They had resided in that convent until it was destroyed in 1537 in the wars between Bologna and the Visconti. Some time later they built a new convent on the via Sant'Isaia, re-using houses and other properties they had acquired there.

The new convent's church was built between 1575 and 1588 by Pietro Fiorini to plans by Antonio Morandi, known as Il Terribilia. It housed the image of the Virgin from San Luca for two days each year during its annual procession. It was rebuilt in the 18th century, with lavish additions to the decor but only minor alterations to the underlying architecture. The convent was suppressed in 1799 after the French invasion and the site given to a private owner. In the 1830s the city council converted the convent buildings into a school, which it still is today, whilst the church was deconsecrated and used as a warehouse until the end of the 1970s. The church and part of the monastery buildings were then sold by the city council to the Sovrintendenza per i beni architettonici dell'Emilia Romagna. This body restored it from 1981 onwards and used it to host cultural events. Since 2015 it has housed the Polo museale dell'Emilia Romagna.
