= Saint Barbatianus =

Priest and saint

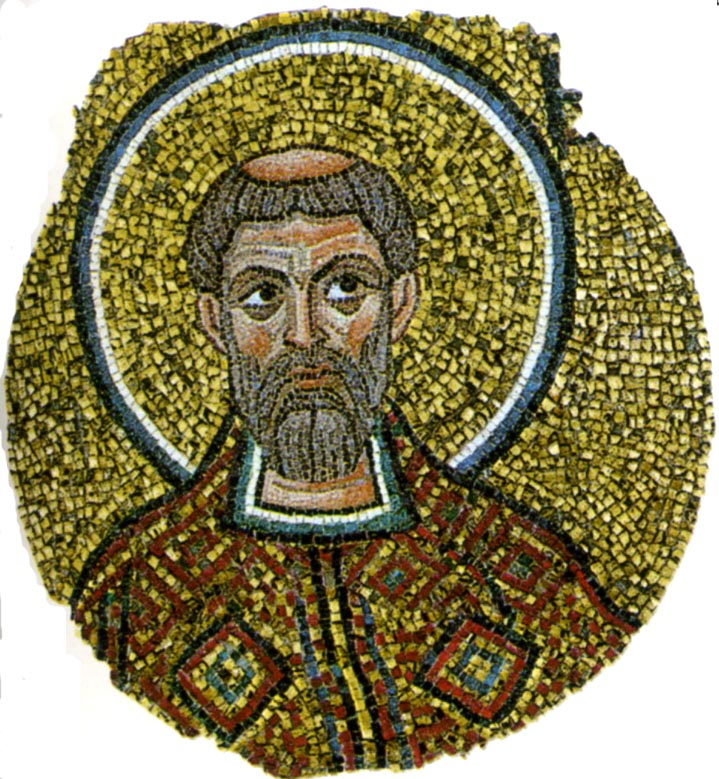
Mosaic of Barbatianus from the cathedral of Ravenna

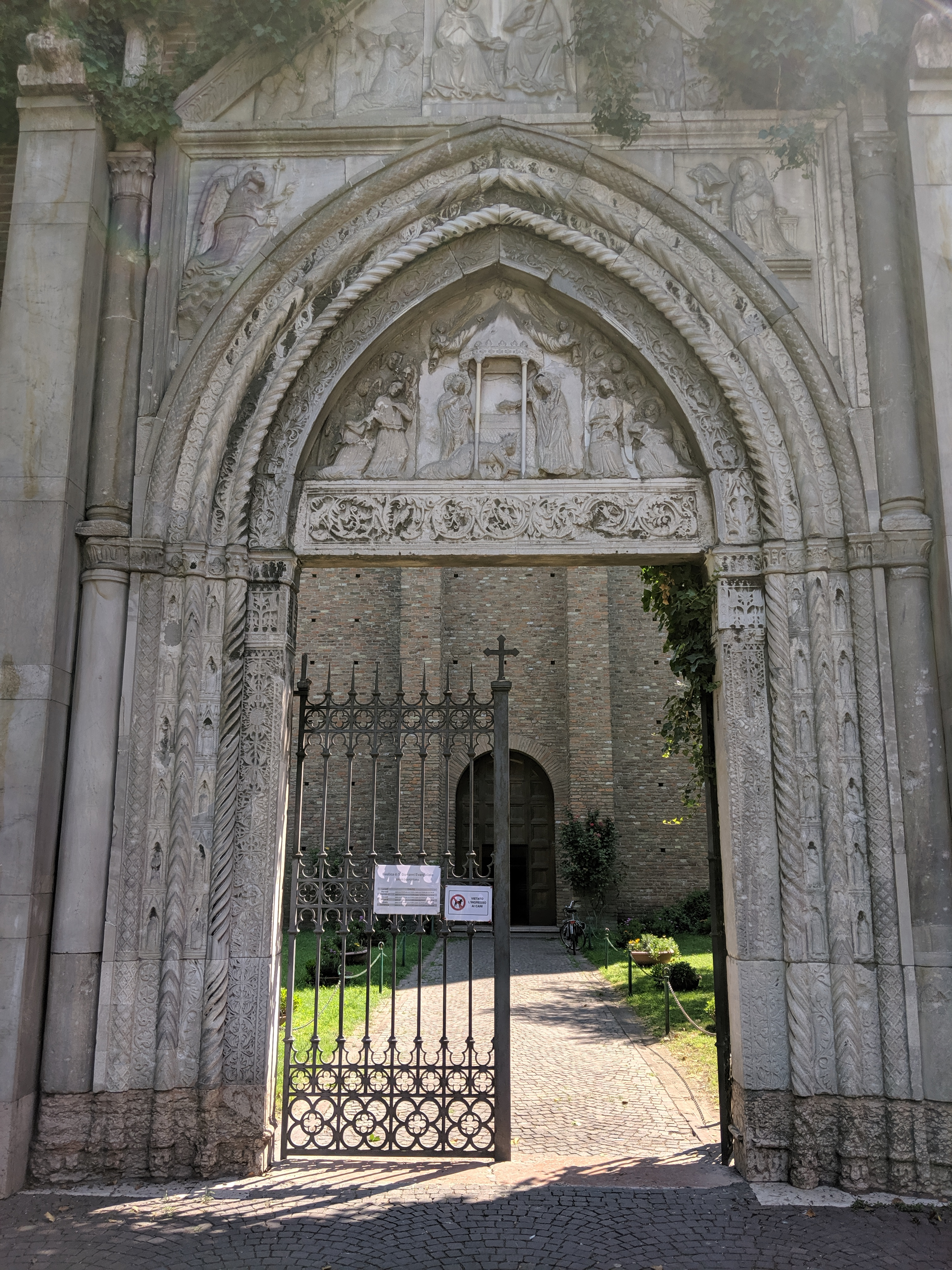
Portal of the church of John the Evangelist in Ravenna, with a tympanum showing the miraculous gift of John's sandal to the empress

Barbatianus, sometimes anglicized Barbatian, was a Syrian hermit, monk and healer who served as the confessor of the Empress Galla Placidia, who lived in Ravenna between 417 and 450.

== Life ==
According to the standard hagiography, Barbatianus was from Antioch. He came to Rome with a companion around 418, shortly after the election of Pope Boniface I. There he was identified as a wonderworker by Galla Placidia, who had him heal a servant of hers. He performed many miracles in Rome before returning with the empress to Ravenna. In Ravenna, he helped her acquire a relic of John the Evangelist for her new church and performed many more miracles. When he died, under the orders of Bishop Peter Chrysologus (r. 431–450), his body was embalmed with aromatics and entombed beside the altar of John the Baptist.

== Primary sources ==
The earliest source to mention Barbatianus is the ninth-century Book of Pontiffs of the Church of Ravenna by Andreas Agnellus. In the tenth century, he became the subject of an anonymous Latin biography, the Vita Barbatiani, inspired by the brief mention by Agnellus and the existence of a church dedicated to him in Ravenna. According to Agnellus:

In the time of the Empress Galla Placidia, as we have found written, the same Peter Chrysologus with the above-mentioned empress preserved the body of blessed Barbatian with aromatics and buried him with great honor not far from the Ovilian gate. And he consecrated the church of Sts. John and Barbatian, which Baduarius built.

It is possible that Agnellus misinterpreted an inscription referring to Bishop Peter III and the general Baduarius, misidentifying the consecrating bishop with Barbatianus' contemporary.

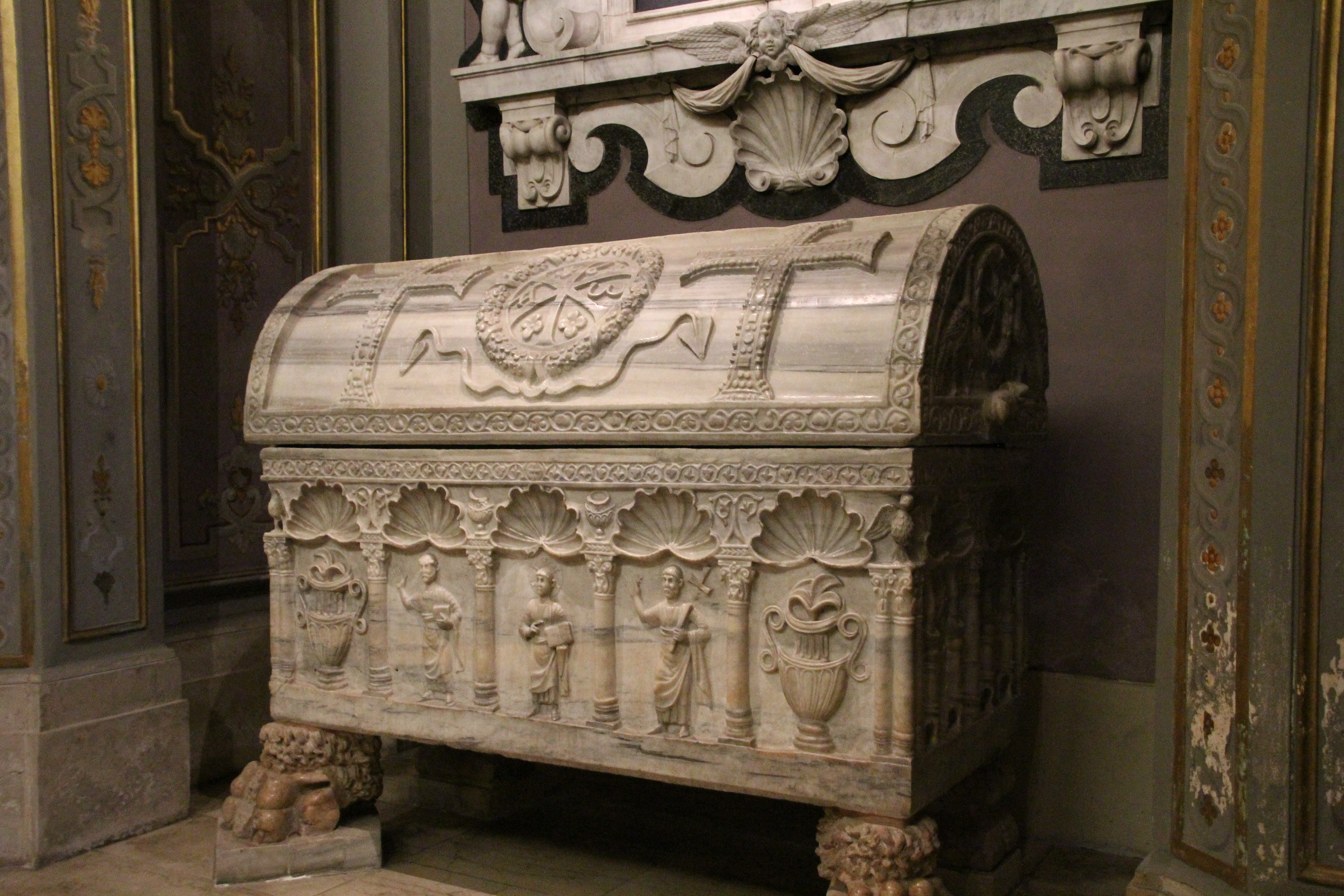
Sarcophagus of Barbatianus, now in the cathedral

The Vita Barbatiani was crafted from a variety of sources to give its account historical authenticity. These include an account of miraculous healings composed by Sophronius of Jerusalem, elements from the Liber Pontificalis and a biography of Pope Sylvester I. Although the creative reworking of tradition leaves "facts concerning the actual life of a man living in the fifth century ... ultimately unreachable", the work is not a mere forgery. By the fifteenth century, there existed a vernacular Italian translation. There is a modern English translation from the Latin.

== Legacy ==
Barbatianus came to be venerated as a saint. His feast was celebrated on December 31 in the Roman calendar and on January 2 in Ravenna. Early on his feast was included in the calendars kept at the abbeys of Cluny and Anchin.

The church (actually a monastery) dedicated to Barbatianus and the Baptist was acquired by the archbishopric at some point and in 1040 by Pomposa Abbey. Around that time, his relics were transferred to the cathedral of Ravenna, where a mosaic image of Barbatianus was added to the apse in the twelfth century.

== Bibliography ==
- Atkinson, Kenneth (2020). Empress Galla Placidia and the Fall of the Roman Empire. McFarland & Company.
- Deliyannis, Deborah Mauskopf, ed. (2004). Agnellus of Ravenna: The Book of the Pontiffs of the Church of Ravenna. The Catholic University of America Press.
- Oost, Stewart Irvin (1968). Galla Placidia Augusta: A Biographical Essay. University of Chicago Press.
- Schoolman, Edward M. (2016). Rediscovering Sainthood in Italy: Hagiography and the Late Antique Past in Medieval Ravenna. Palgrave Macmillan.
