= Carracci =

Family of Italian artists

The Carracci (/kəˈrɑːtʃi/ kə-RAH-chee, UK also /kəˈrætʃi/ kə-RATCH-ee, Italian: [karˈrattʃi]) were a family of Italian artists. Art historians have studied their works individually and collectively.

Notable members include:

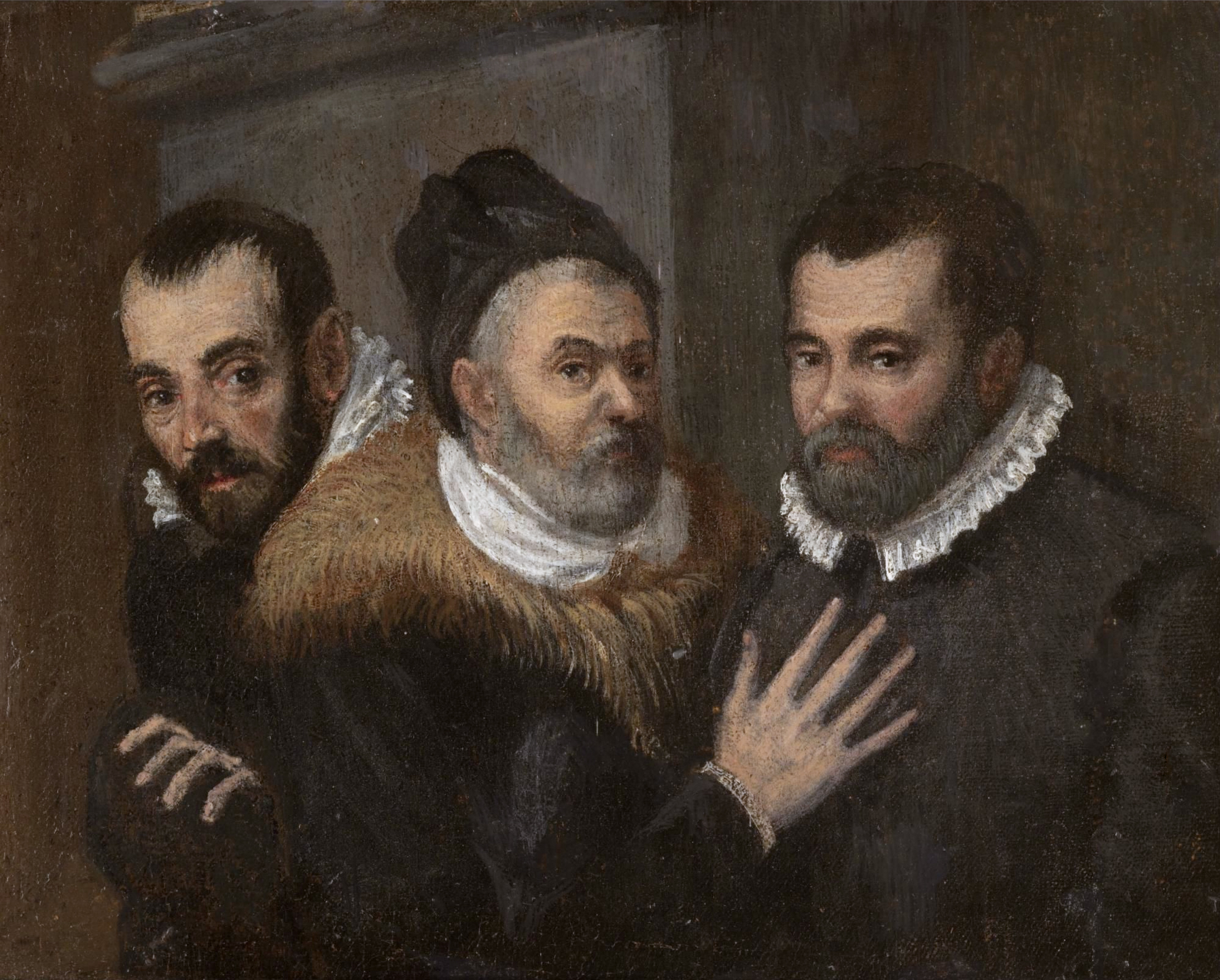
Annibale, Ludovico and Agostino Carracci, of the Bolognese School, worked together

- the three members who worked together and are known collectively as the Carracci, i.e.:
  - Agostino Carracci (1557–1602), Italian painter and printmaker
  - Annibale Carracci (1560–1609), Italian Baroque painter and brother of Agostino Carracci
  - Ludovico Carracci (1555–1619), Italian painter, etcher, printmaker, and cousin of Agostino and Annibale Carracci
- Antonio Marziale Carracci (1583–1618), Italian painter and son of Agostino Carracci
- Baldassare Aloisi (1578–1638), painter and engraver whose mother, Elena Zenzanini, was a cousin of Agostino and Annibale Carracci
- Francesco Carracci (1595–1622), Italian painter and engraver, nephew of Agostino and Annibale Carracci
- Giovanni Francesco Grimaldi (1606–1680), painter, whose common law wife was Baldassare Aloisi's daughter

== See also ==
- Accademia dei Carracci, a Bolognese art academy founded by the family
- José Caracci Vignatti (1887–1979), an unrelated artist.
