= The Last Communion of Saint Jerome (Botticelli) =

Painting by Sandro Botticelli

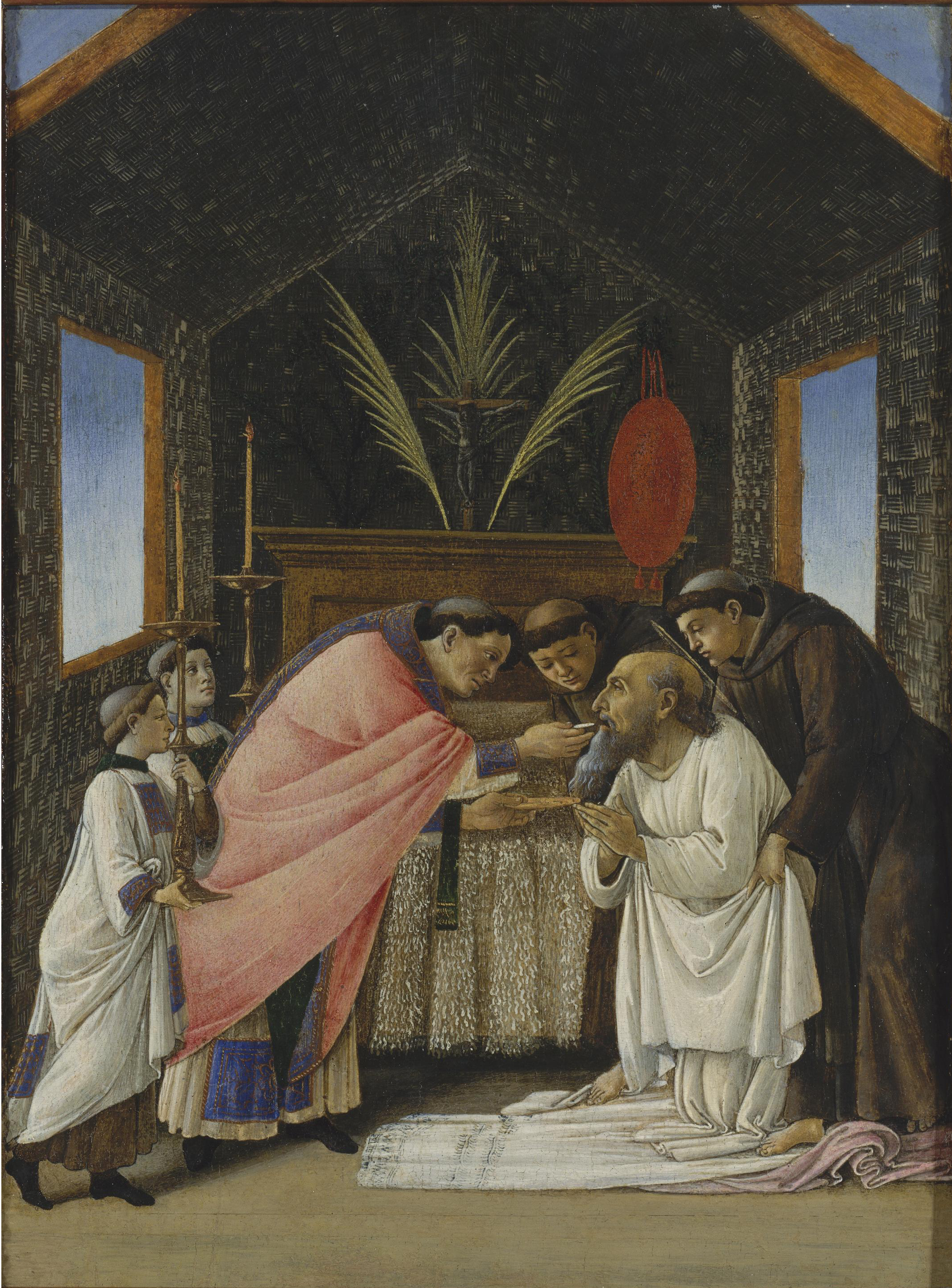
- Artist: Sandro Botticelli
- Year: 1494–1495
- Medium: Tempera on panel
- Dimensions: 34.3 cm × 25.5 cm (13.5 in × 10.0 in)
- Location: Metropolitan Museum of Art, New York

The Last Communion of Saint Jerome is a painting by the Italian Renaissance master Sandro Botticelli, finished around 1494–1495. It is now in the Metropolitan Museum of Art, in New York City.

The picture was inspired by the pseudepigraphical medieval Epistle of Eusebius to Damasus, also known as De morte Hieronymi. Rita Lizzi Testa writes, “The painting represents the very moment in which Jerome, having gathered his companions from the monastery around him, is lying on a linen sheet and is asking one of his brothers to bring him the body of Christ….The epistle recalls that when Jerome saw the priest come closer, he asked his companions to help him get to his knees, while professing his faith in Christ whose body and blood are present in the wafer.” No ancient author is known to have described this scene.

Testa connects the subject matter of Botticelli’s painting with the preaching of Girolamo Savonarola in Florence around the time of its execution. The pseudepigraphical epistle from which the scene derives had lately become popular in Italy, undergoing several reprints from 1471 to 1487, meanwhile the supporters of Savonarola found in it “a simplified compendium of what they believed to be the authentic message of the most ancient form of Christianity”. Botticelli was commissioned by Francesco del Pugliese, a noted follower of Savonarola, and Testa opines that del Pugliese, sensing an analogue between the figures of Jerome and Savonarola, may have been “thinking of the last moments of Savonarola’s life” when he commissioned this particular scene.

The subject was also later depicted by the Baroque Bolognese painter Agostino Carracci in his painting now in the Pinacoteca Nazionale di Bologna, and by the Baroque painter Domenichino in a painting in the Vatican Pinacoteca.

== See also ==
- List of works by Sandro Botticelli
