= The Carracci =

Bolognese family of artists

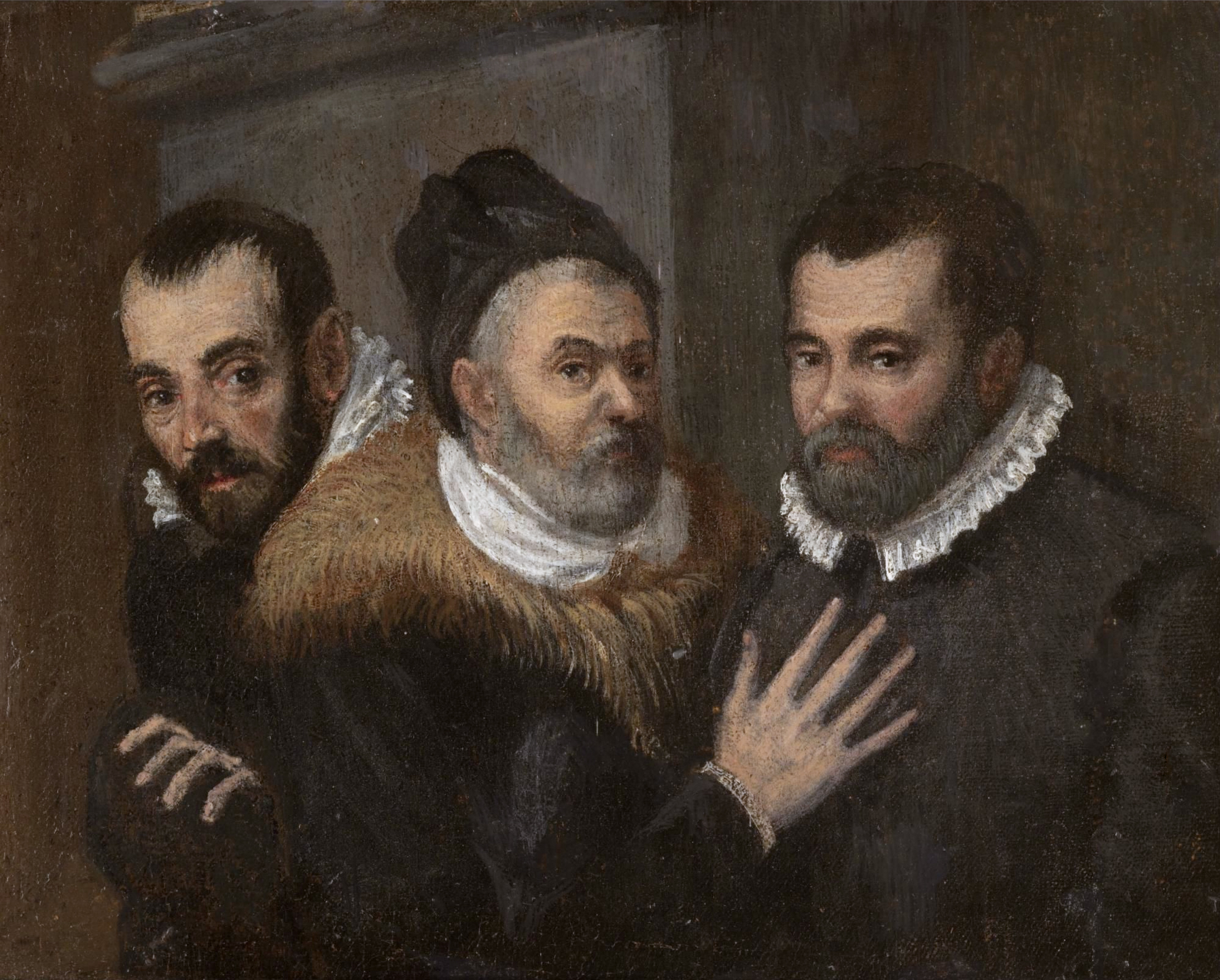
From left to right, Annibale, Ludovico, and Agostino Carracci, by an unknown painter

The Carracci (/kəˈrɑːtʃi/ kə-RAH-chee, UK also /kəˈrætʃi/ kə-RATCH-ee, Italian: [karˈrattʃi]) were a Bolognese family of artists that played an instrumental role in bringing forth the Baroque style in painting. Brothers Annibale (1560–1609) and Agostino (1557–1602) along with their cousin Ludovico (1555–1619) worked collaboratively. The Carracci family left their legacy in art theory by starting a school for artists in 1582. The school was called the Accademia degli Incamminati, and its main focus was to oppose and challenge Mannerist artistic practices and principles in order to create a renewed art of naturalism and expressive persuasion.

== Art theory ==
The artistic and theoretical activity of the Carracci is recognized by critics and historians such as André Chastel and Giulio Carlo Argan to have decisively contributed to the formation of the figurative Baroque and to new pictorial solutions based on the recuperation of the classical and Renaissance tradition, renewed by study of nature. "Jointly they effected an artistic reform that overthrew Mannerist aesthetics and initiated the Baroque."

The crisis of the culture of Catholicism was highlighted after the Protestant Reform (in 1517 Martin Luther expounded his 95 theses in Wittenberg), and the successive "sack of Rome" by the troops of Charles V in 1527, facts that rendered the papal capital more insecure and unstable, and less attractive to the artists of the Roman epoch who at the end of the 16th century were less inclined to produce a new artistic movement.

The mannerist art that wearily replicated the style of the masters of the Renaissance, emphasizing formal complications and virtuosity, no longer obeyed the need for clarity and devotion. Bologna was at the center of a territory in which the work of the artists traditionally had a pronounced devotional and pietistic character, and was influenced by north Italian and Venetian art. On these cultural and aesthetic bases the Carracci developed their work as theorists of artistic renewal, emphasizing the humanity of subjects and the clarity of the sacred scenes.

The eclecticism of their art, the respect for tradition and a language adapted to the public places frequented by the working classes satisfied the desires of the church of the Counter-Reformation that needed a new mode to express its primacy over the other religions and confirm that art could and had to be a vehicle towards faith.

Another principle of the Carracci doctrine was the devotional aspect, the respect of the orthodoxy of the represented history. The Carracci followed the instructions contained in the work of the theorists of the time such as the Cardinal Gabriele Paleotti, author in 1582 of De sacris et profanis imaginibus ("on sacred and profane images") which advocated for the control on the part of the ecclesiastic authority of the contents of the sacred scenes (the saints and their attributes had to be easily recognizable and respectful of the traditional, additionally the stories had to demonstrate fidelity towards the sacred texts), while the artists retained the "liberty" to choose the most suitable style.

Another point of reference was the work of Giovanni Andrea Gilio, author of Due Dialoghi...degli errori dei pittori ("two dialogues...on the errors of painters") in 1564 in which he criticized the excesses of refinement, of allegories and the bizarre inventions of the Mannerist art. The stories and the characters rendered lifelike in imitation of nature had to then be ennobled by the exercise of the art and refined on the example of the great masters of the past such as Raphael and Michelangelo, but also Titian, Veronese, Tintoretto, Correggio, and Parmigianino.

Agostino was also an important printmaker, reproducing the works of masters from the 16th century (mainly Correggio and Veronese) as examples to imitate for the numerous students of their school. Annibale was the most talented and the one who, following his trip to Rome in 1595 where the works would be exhibited until his death in 1609, exercised a decisive influence on the fate of Italian painting at the dawn of the 17th century.

== Accademia degli Incamminati ==
Driven by the desire to explore and share their new-found approach to painting, the Carracci family collectively founded a school of art in Bologna around 1582. Initially named Accademia dei Desiderosi ("Academy of the Desirous"), the school most likely began as an informal gathering of young artists in Ludovico Carracci's studio. Around 1590, the academy was renamed Accademia degli Incamminati ("Academy of Those who are Making Progress" or "Academy of the Journeying"), and adopted a more didactic academic programme.

There is some debate regarding the school's organization and academic structure. However, it is likely that the academy functioned as a combination of a painters' workshop and a formal institution, and was attended by both students and established artists alike.

Each member of the Carracci family made a unique contribution to the academy. It is believed that Ludovico Carracci occupied an administrative position, while Agostino was responsible for gathering new information, and Annibale for providing creativity, inspiration, and lessons on painting technique. Ludovico assembled and consolidated new materials to use as teaching aids, including a collection of plaster casts of classical works. Agostino brought to the school a wealth of knowledge in a variety of subjects, including art, music, philosophy, math, astronomy, geography, cartography, anthropology, and natural history. He used his knowledge of anatomy to construct detailed drawings of the human form, and provided books and medals from his own collection for the benefit of the students. Annibale, the most experienced artist of the group, shared his knowledge of painting via collaborative works with his pupils.

The Carracci intended to provide the educated next generation of artists with an education that was valid both from a practical and theoretical point of view. The students were trained in a number of subjects to establish an intellectual background from which they could develop their artistic skill. Great emphasis was placed on the study of nature, and students were encouraged to practice drawing from life. The Carracci led their pupils in the study of experimental drawing, caricature, landscape painting, imitation, anatomy, perspective, and artistic theory. Students were also taught history, fables, and poetic inventions from which to draw inspiration.

Notable students of the Carracci Academy include Francesco Albani, Guido Reni, Domenico Zampieri (Domenichino), Giovanni Lanfranco, Antonio Carracci, and Sisto Badalocchio.

The opening of the Accademia degli Incamminati brought the Carracci name to great repute and attracted numerous commissions. These projects were typically allocated among the family by Ludovico or completed jointly by the three Carracci.

== Collective works ==
There is much speculation and debate among art historians about which of the Carracci family members designed and executed various aspects of the frescoes that they painted. Extant preparatory sketches for the frescoes indicate that for each artwork, the preliminary sketches were likely created by all of the Carracci collaboratively. Likewise the finished frescoes would have been painted by all three of the Carracci but "despite much debate, there is no consensus among scholars as to the attribution of several scenes". "When asked who had done each scene, the Carracci, having freely traded ideas and sketches, and having worked elbow to elbow, are claimed to have responded, 'it is by the Carracci, we did it together.' Such intimate collaboration, in which the individual style was sublimated in favor of a seamless, lively, and highly illusionistic effect, is characteristic of the Carracci's early period".

From 1583 to 1594, Annibale, Agostino, and Ludovico worked collaboratively to paint frescos on ceilings and walls of palaces in Bologna and Ferrara. One of their first joint commissions was the Palazzo Fava in Bologna. Here the Carracci painted frescoes of the Stories of Europa (1583–84), Stories of Jason (1583–84), and Stories of Aeneas (1586). The Carracci family's masterpiece, Stories of the Founding of Rome, was completed circa 1589–90, and is located in the main salon at the Palazzo Magnani-Salem in Bologna. In 1592, the Carracci went to Ferrara to decorate the ceiling of Palazzo dei Diamanti with scenes of the "Gods of Olympus." The following years, 1593–94, the Carracci were commissioned to paint frescoes of New Testament scenes and figures in three rooms of the Palazzo Sampieri-Talon in Bologna.

The popularity of the Carracci's frescoes at these Italian palaces (particularly the paintings at the Palazzo Magnani) caught the attention of another noble family, the Farnese. The Duke of Parma and Piacenza, Ranuccio VI, and his brother, Cardinal Odoardo approached the Carracci in 1593 and asked them to come to Rome to decorate the Palazzo Farnese. In 1594 Annibale and Agostino went to Rome while Ludovico stayed in Bologna. "This summons signaled the end of the joint Carracci studio".

== Works ==
- Head of a Faun in a Concave (drawing in roundel, c. 1595, National Gallery of Art, Washington DC)
- The Penitent Magdalen (private collection)
- The Annunciation, Musée du Louvre, Paris
- The Lamentation, Hermitage, St. Petersburg
- Reciprico Amore, Baltimore Museum of Art
- Carracci's erotic work

== See also ==
- Antonio Marziale Carracci
