= The Last Communion of Saint Jerome (Domenichino) =

Painting by Domenichino

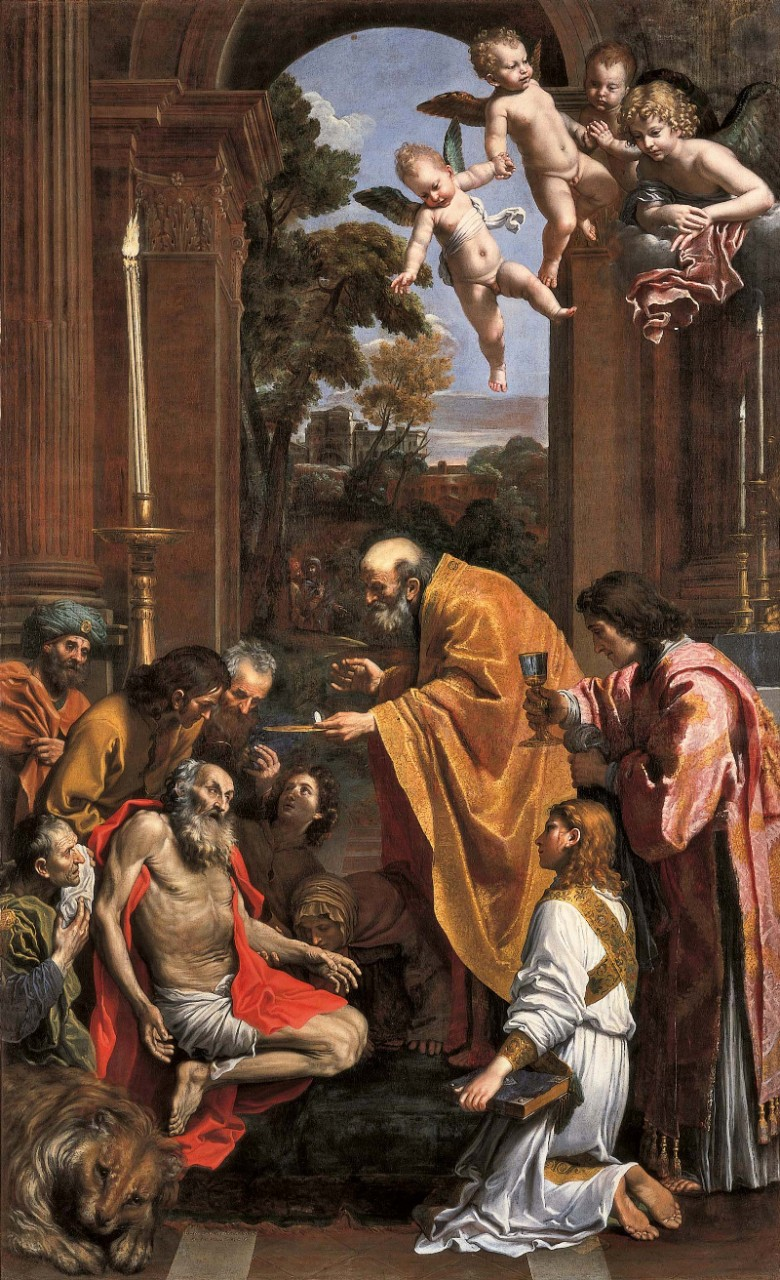
- Altar of St. Jerome
- Artist: Domenichino
- Year: 1612–1614
- Medium: oil on canvas
- Dimensions: 419 cm × 256 cm (165 in × 101 in)
- Location: Pinacoteca Vaticana, Rome

The Last Communion of Saint Jerome is a 1614 oil-on-canvas painting by the Italian artist Domenichino. It was commissioned for the Church of Saint Jerome of the Charity in Rome in 1612 and the original is now in the Pinacoteca Vaticana. The composition is very similar to a painting of the same subject by Agostino Carracci. Domenichino's rival, Giovanni Lanfranco, accused Domenichino of plagiarism due to the similarities.

== Subject matter ==
The main subject of this painting is Saint Jerome, who is the thin central figure depicted kneeling with the red cloth. Saint Jerome (c. 347–420) is a Christian Latin scholar, translator, and priest. He was considered a Doctor of the Church, a saint whose doctrinal writings had special authority. One of his accomplishments is translating the Bible into Latin. From 382 to 385, he was a secretary for Pope Damasus I in Rome.

Domenichino's painting shares its subject with an earlier painting by Sandro Botticelli, in which Botticelli depicted a scene from the pseudepigraphical letter of Eusebius to Damasus.

== History ==
=== Commission ===
The Church of Saint Jerome of the Archconfraternity of Charity in Rome had been undergoing renovations and was being refurbished between 1611 and 1615. Domenichino was commissioned to do a painting for the high altar of the church. He was paid 240 scudi for the commission of this painting of The Last Communion of Saint Jerome. This was Domenichino's first public commission for an altarpiece. Domenichino had worked on this painting for two years before its completion in 1614.

=== Plagiarism ===
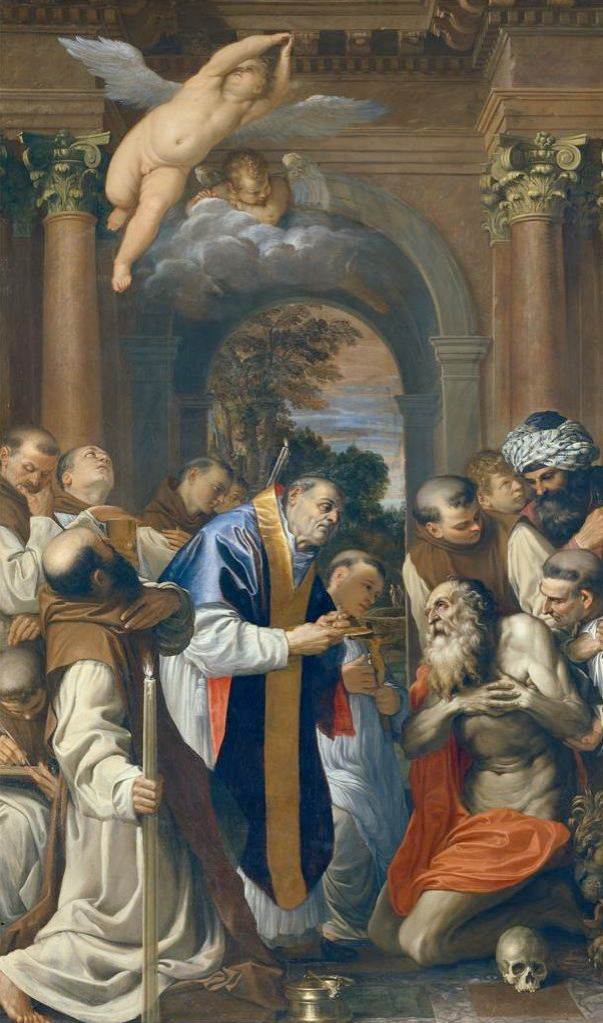
Agostino Carracci, Last Communion of Saint Jerome, Pinacoteca Nazionale, Bologna.

In 1620, Giovanni Lanfranco accused Domenichino of stealing ideas from Agostino Carracci's painting of the same subject matter. At the time of this accusation, both Domenichino and Giovanni Lanfranco had been competing for a commission in S. Andrea delle Valle. Giovanni Pietro Bellori and Nicolas Poussin both helped to defend Domenichino against this charge. Domenichino, along with Lanfranco and Francesco Albani, were well-known pupils who had trained under Annibale Carracci in the Carracci Academy. During this time Domenichino was more renowned and better established as an independent artist in comparison to his fellow pupils, Lanfranco and Albani. Annibale Carracci had died in 1609 and was also the brother of Agostino Carracci who had died in 1602.

Agostino Carracci had been commissioned in 1592 by the Certosa in Bologna to paint the Last Communion of Saint Jerome and finished it in late 1593. The Last Communion of Saint Jerome was a subject painted rarely at this time, which added more leverage to Lanfranco's charge of theft. In Passeri's defense for Domenichino, he claimed that it was hard to avoid the example set by Carracci's painting of the central figures of Jerome receiving communion from the priest and that Agostino's central image of Saint Jerome was so definitive that Domenichino had no alternative way of envisioning the scene without including the inspiration from Agostino's version. Passeri continued by stating that Domenichino did what he could to vary from Carracci's version, by changing the secondary figures, composition, and other details in his own interpretation. Domenichino himself also openly admitted that he had been inspired by Agostino's painting, but did not intend any harm.

Domenichino left Rome for Naples in 1631. His reason for leaving is unknown. It may have been due to his declining health, legal trouble, or the promise of more lucrative commissions in Naples. However, we do know that this plagiarism case caused Domenichino to acquire notoriety, which sometimes eclipsed the fame of his skill.

=== Similarities with Caracci's version ===
Elements in Domenichino's version that are similar to Carracci's are the use of flying putti, the large candlesticks, and the main figure of St. Jerome. Domenichino's figure of St. Jerome is almost identical to Agostino's, except for mirroring the placement and changing the pose to open arms. The red fabric wrapped around Saint Jerome is similar in both paintings, but how they are placed on the figure differs. Agostino has it hanging off one shoulder and laying on his lap. Domenichino has it loosely hanging off Saint Jerome's' shoulders, as if it's about to fall off him and revealing white fabric wrapped around his waist. There are also some figures in the background that are similar to Agostino's, such as the man with the turban. For the most part Domenichino changed the placement of the figures and the design and wardrobe of the priest and crowd. Even the backgrounds are similar, with rounded archways leading back towards a rural landscape with trees, although Agostino has composite columns near the middle ground, while Domenichino has Corinthian columns. The symbolism they use is different. Domenichino has a lion in the lower left, which is a symbol for St. Jerome. Meanwhile Agostino had a skull to the lower right to symbolism St. Jerome's death.

== Reception ==
Domenichino considered The Last Communion of Saint Jerome to be his masterpiece. Other artists at this time, such as Andrea Sacchi and Nicolas Poussin, even considered it to be equal to Raphael's Transfiguration. However, after the appropriation scandal and accusations by Lanfranco, Domenichino began to be viewed by others in a negative light. After the public debates over the issues of infringement for the Last Communion of Saint Jerome, this sparked a bigger debate that challenged the traditional values of imitation.

There were a few scholars and artists who supported Domenichino. The Italian scholar Carlo Cesare Malvasia (1616–1693) responded to Domenichino's notoriety and artists in general by writing, "What painter does not steal in some way? Either from prints, or reliefs, or nature herself, or from the works of others, turning the poses in the opposite sense, twisting an arm more, showing a leg, changing the face, adding a drapery, and, in short, judiciously hiding the theft?"

The issue of the painting's source or model did not bother other commentators on aesthetics. Writing in the early 18th century the art critic and philosopher Anthony Cooper, 3rd Earl of Shaftesbury considered The Last Communion to be "the best painting in the world."
