= Triple Portrait of Arrigo, Pietro and Amon =

Painting by Agostino Carracci

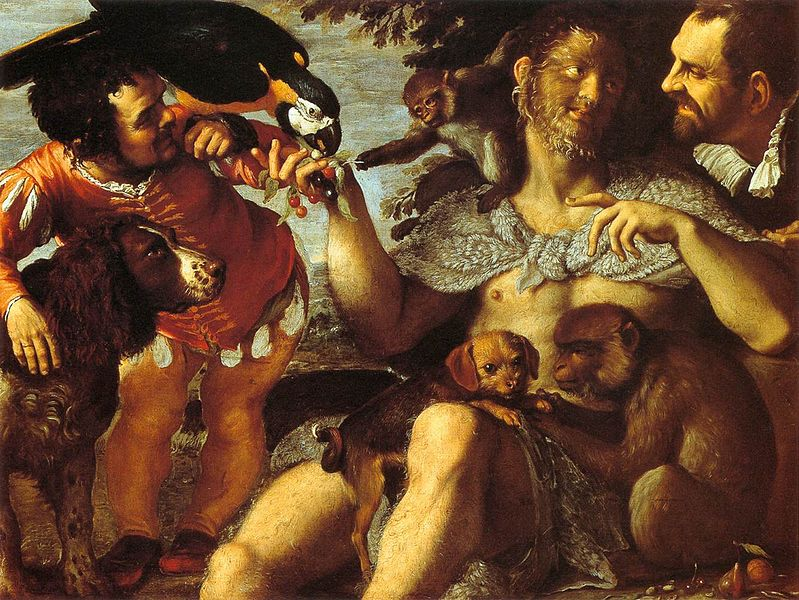
- Artist: Agostino Carracci
- Year: 1598-1600
- Medium: oil on canvas
- Dimensions: 101 cm × 103 cm (40 in × 41 in)
- Location: National Museum of Capodimonte, Naples

Triple Portrait of Arrigo, Pietro and Amon is an oil on canvas painting by the Italian artist Agostino Carracci, from 1598–1600. It was produced in Rome whilst he was assisting his brother Annibale Carracci with the frescoes in the Palazzo Farnese for Odoardo Farnese. It is now in the National Museum of Capodimonte, in Naples.

== Description ==
Previously misidentified as an allegorical or mythological artwork, Roberto Zapperi has identified it instead as a group portrait. To the right is the hairy-faced Arrigo, a sufferer from hypertrichosis, with the head of 'Pietro Matto' or 'Mad Peter' in the top right hand corner. To the left is the dwarf Amon, with a parrot on his shoulder and a dog under his right arm.
