= The Last Communion of Saint Jerome (Agostino Carracci) =

Painting by Agostino Carracci

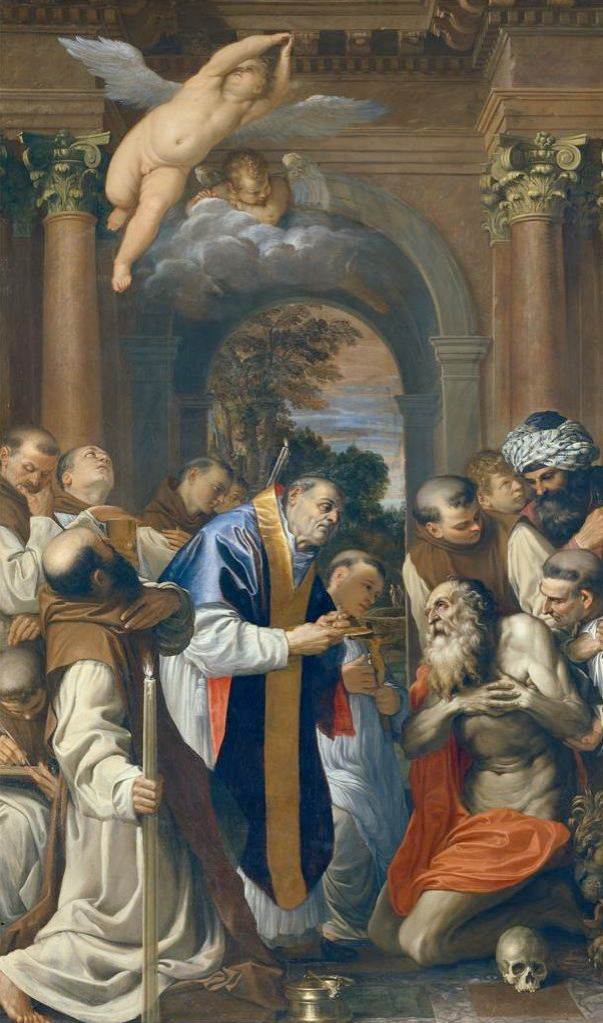
- Artist: Agostino Carracci
- Year: c. 1592–1597
- Medium: oil on canvas
- Dimensions: 376 cm × 224 cm (148 in × 88 in)
- Location: Pinacoteca Nazionale di Bologna, Bologna

The Last Communion of Saint Jerome or The Communion of Saint Jerome is an oil painting on canvas by the Italian painter Agostino Carracci, created c. 1592–1597. It was produced for San Girolamo alla Certosa church in Bologna and it is now held in the Pinacoteca Nazionale di Bologna.

== History ==
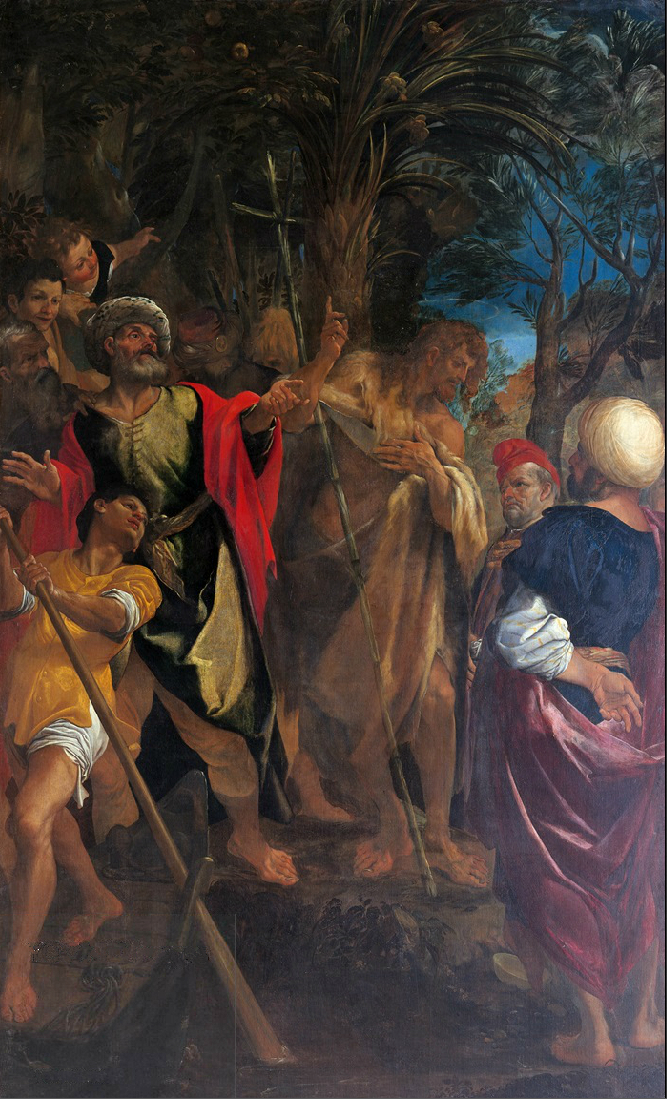
Ludovico Carracci, The Preaching of Saint John the Baptist, 1592, Pinacoteca Nazionale di Bologna.

Last Communion originally hung in San Girolamo opposite the 1592 The Preaching of Saint John the Baptist by Agostino's cousin Ludovico, now also in the Pinacoteca Nazionale di Bologna. It is thought Agostino's work was painted around the same time, with both works forming part of a redecoration of the church. A drawing of the same subject by Ludovico (now in the Metropolitan Museum of Art) has very similar figures of the saint and the priest administering the sacrament, perhaps meaning Ludovico assisted Agostino in producing Last Communion The work is praised in a lengthy passage of Giovanni Pietro Bellori's Lives of the Artists (1672), calling it Agostino's masterpiece.

Carlo Cesare Malvasia's Felsina Pittrice (1678) states that Agostino severely delayed completion of the work, only working on it occasionally and completely abandoning it for long periods, even considering returning the advance fee on the work to free himself from the commission until he was finally convinced to complete it via efforts of Orazio Spinola, papal vice-legate in Bologna. Spinola received that post in 1597 meaning that – if Malvasia's story is believed – the work was only completed very shortly after that date, after which Agostino is recorded as following his brother Annibale to Rome. This would mean the work took five years. The large number of figures in a closed space suggests a later date to some art historians.

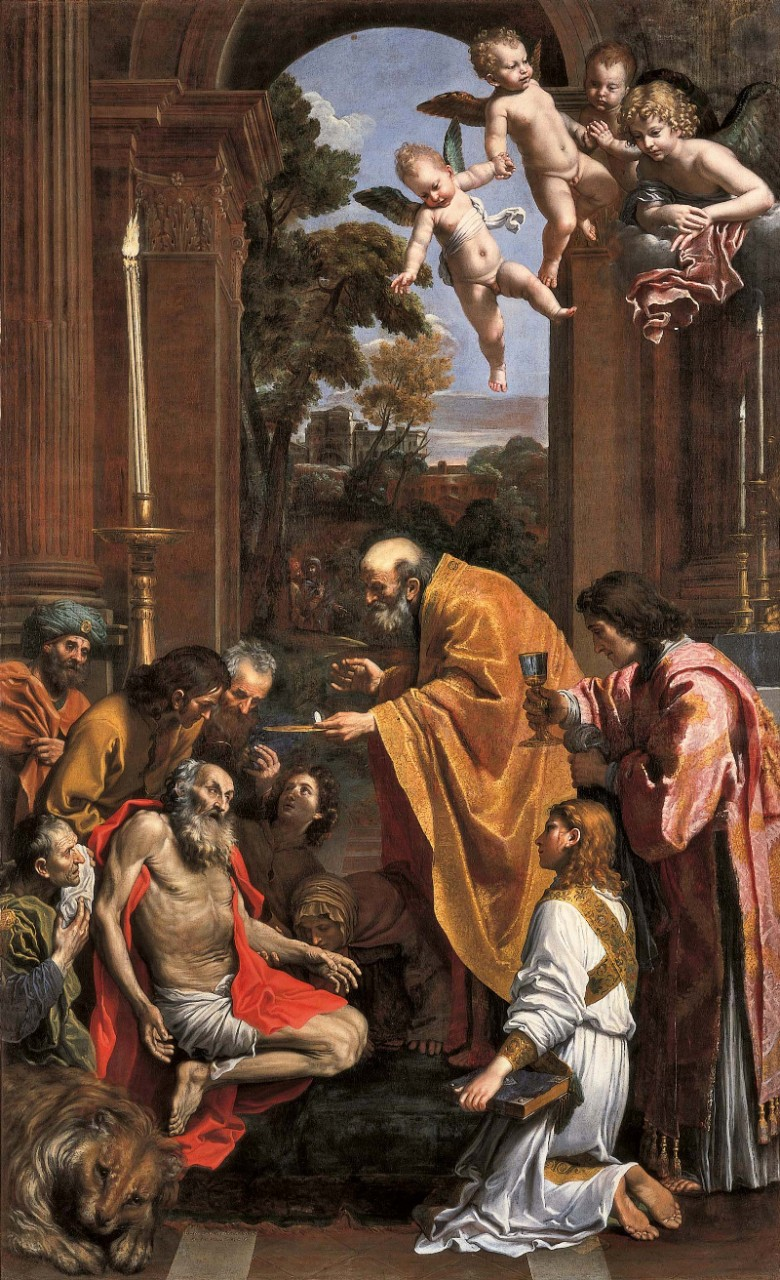
Domenichino, The Last Communion of Saint Jerome, 1614, Pinacoteca vaticana

A few decades after the completion of Communion, it was the subject of a dispute between Domenichino and Lanfranco, both trained by the Carracci. In 1614 Domenichino finished a painting on the same subject for the church of San Girolamo alla Carità in Rome, with several similarities to Agostino's treatment. A few years later, when Domenichino and Lanfranco were competing for important commissions in Rome, the latter accused the former of plagiarising Agostino's work. Lanfranco even had his student François Perrier create a print of Agostino's painting to prove his point, since it was less well known in Rome than in Bologna. The episode did little damage to Domenichino and Bellori "acquitted" him of plagiarism and called his version of the subject a "praiseworthy imitation" of Agostino's treatment.

The work was seized by French troops in 1796 and taken to Paris. It was returned in 1817 after the Congress of Vienna restored it to the Papal States, of which Bologna was then a part.

== Analysis ==
The large canvas illustrates the last moments of the life of Father of the Church Jerome, while, assisted by other brothers, he prepares on his knees to receive his last communion. The scene takes place in a classicising setting (the Basilica of the Nativity in Bethlehem, according to Bellori) which opens onto a tree-lined landscape at sunset, visible through an archway.

In the arrangement of the many characters present, two groups face each other: the first is dominated by the priest, the central axis of the painting, who administers the sacrament assisted by some monks with conspicuous tonsures, struck by the light coming from the left. Some monks look up in surprise, where there are two angels, symbol of the divine presence.

In front, in the second group, there is Jerome, now an old man, but whose body still shows some traces of an ancient vigor, who is preparing to take the consecrated host while two brothers support him. A man in a turban also appears, to remind us that the event takes place in the Holy Land.

All the typical attributes of the iconography of Saint Jerome are present: the skull, symbol of his rejection of the fleeting life of this earth; the crucifix, the object of his meditations as a hermit and, finally, the lion, his faithful companion, which can just be glimpsed in the lower right corner of the canvas.

The image is described in the smallest details, precisely delineating the shapes and volume of the figures thanks to a highly analytical drawing, while the influence of Venetian painting is decisive in the colour. The ability to communicate the moods and feelings of the bystanders, and in particular the deep sense of religiosity that pervades the depicted scene, has been appreciated by critics. Regarding this painting, Bellori considered it a shame that Agostino had dedicated himself so much to the art of engraving, taking energy away from painting.
