= Portrait of a Woman as Judith =

Painting by Agostino Carracci

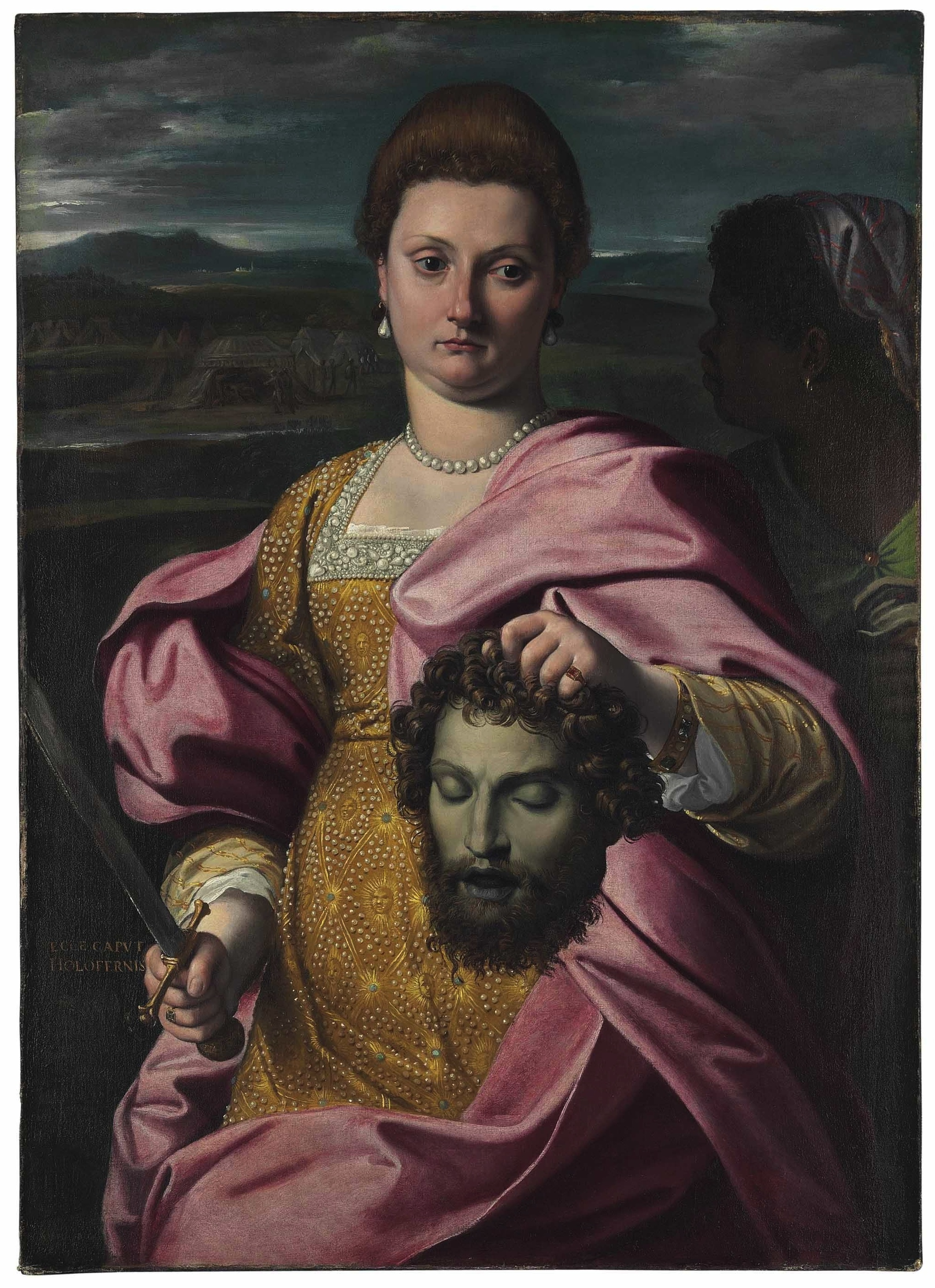
- Artist: Agostino Carracci
- Year: c. 1590–1595
- Medium: oil on canvas
- Dimensions: 122.5 cm × 88 cm (48.2 in × 35 in)
- Location: Private collection

Portrait of a Woman as Judith is an oil on canvas painting by the Italian artist Agostino Carracci, from c. 1590–1595, now in a private collection. It is signed A. CAR. BON. (Agostino Carracci from Bologna) at bottom left.

== Identification ==
The work was lost until re-appearing on the art market in 1985. The Australian art historian Jaynie Anderson identified its subject as Olimpia Luna (died 1592) depicted in the guise of the biblical figure Judith, with Holofernes' head modelled on her husband Melchiorre Zoppio (1544–1634) Zoppio was a co-founder of the Accademia dei Gelati in Bologna, an association of writers, poets and scholars of which Agostino was probably a member.

Anderson drew on several documentary sources, particularly the oration at Agostino's funeral in January 1603 (about a year after his death) by Lucio Faberi (or Faberio), notary of the Company of Painters in Bologna, as quoted by Carlo Cesare Malvasia in his chapter on the funeral in Felsina Pittrice (1678). This states it was painted after Olimpia's death, with Faberi stating "if it is a great deed to paint a portrait from nature, how much greater a deed it is to do the same when the subject is absent; it is certainly most great and marvellous to do such a thing, painting a person already dead, buried, unseen, without a drawing or imprint, but solely and simply from others' accounts ... As her husband relates [Agostino Carracci] made the portrait of [Zoppo's] wife Olimpia Luna, who was wife to the Most Excellent Melchiorre Zoppio". He goes on to add that Zoppio himself stated that he particularly appreciated the painting and dedicated a sonnet to it, which Faberi quoted in its entirety in his oration.

Elsewhere in Felsina Pittrice Malvasia states that Agostino "made [for Zoppio] the portrait of his wife, already dead and buried, from [Zoppio's] memory, with a small portrait of himself in her hand", which Anderson identifies with the head of Holofernes. She also argues that the subject's rich golden dress, studded with jewels and pearls to shine like the moon, was a play on Olimpia's maiden name Luna (the Italian word for moon). In 1603 Zoppio wrote a short book, only published later under the title Consolation of Melchiorre Zoppio, moral philosophy on the death of his wife Olimpia Luna Zoppio (Consolatione di Melchiorre Zoppio, filosofo morale nella morte della moglie Olimpia Luna Z [oppio]). In it he described how he had a vision of a woman during a night of torment and how that vision revealed herself to be his late wife. The description of the vision's dress matches details in the painting, particularly its "turquoise dress, studded with pearls divided into flames representing shooting stars", adding that "all told, there was nothing in her that did not signify heaven to me". Though this does not match the colour of the dress in the portrait, it does match its pearl motifs of shooting stars, perhaps meaning the book was inspired by the painting not vice versa.

Not all art historians unreservedly accept Anderson's identification, especially since the funerary oration does not mention the fact that the double portrait was in the guise of Judith and Holofernes, a silence which is hard to explain given that fact's significance. The head of Holofernes also does not seem to match other known portraits of Zoppio, such as a print now in the National Library of Austria and a painted portrait, both probably copying the same source. Anderson argues that the portrait in the print matches the head of Holofernes, whilst others argue the two images are only generically similar in appearance.

== Analysis ==
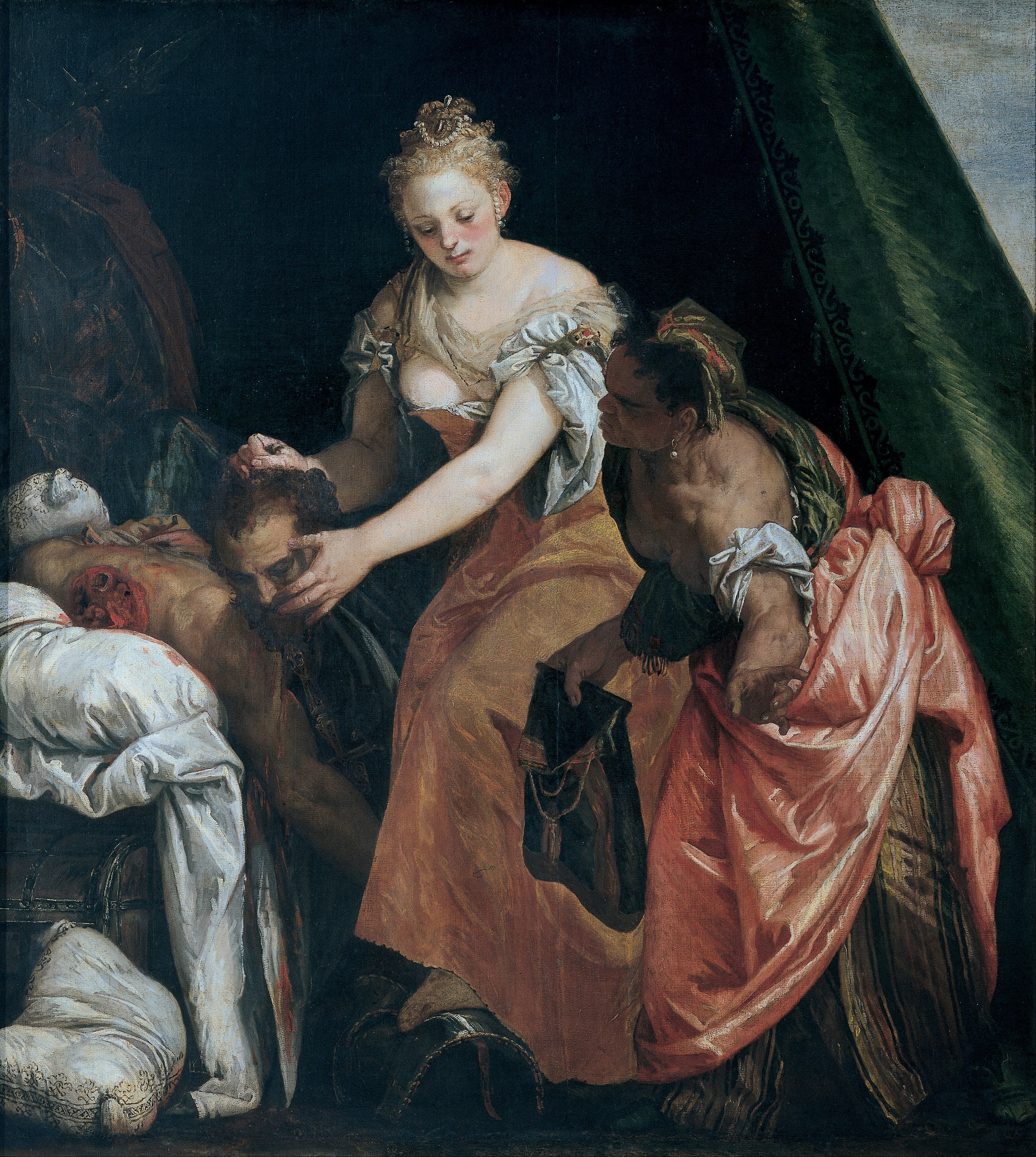
Paolo Veronese, Judith with Holofernes' Head, c. 1580, Palazzo Rosso, Genova

The biblical heroine, with a solid build and a sumptuous dress, dominates the scene showing the spectator the head of the Assyrian general that she had shortly before beheaded.

Her face has a severe and melancholically quiet expression (details in which Anderson finds a further consonance with the sources and which she finds consistent with the hypothesis that it is the portrait of a person already dead). The physiognomic realism of Judith's face proves without a doubt that it is a portrait (whether or not it is that of Olimpia Luna); evidently that of a lady of high social rank, as can be deduced not only from her very rich dress, but also from the jewels she wears and her refined hairstyle.

Holofernes' face is also very effective – his hair and beard are accurately rendered – and in which Augustine did not particularly insist on the spasms of death.

In the background, in an auroral light, we see the Assyrian camp, from which Judith has just escaped, assisted by a maid, with her macabre trophy. In a tent we glimpse the headless body of Holofernes, while the camp is gripped by dismay in the face of such a terrifying discovery.

The influences of Venetian painting are perceptible – Agostino Carracci, in fact, stayed in the Lagoon until a few years before the presumed date of execution of this painting – which can be seen both in the particular atmospheric and luministic consistency that pervades the canvas and in the figure of the black maidservant who is in all probability a quotation from Veronese taken from the painting, of a similar subject, now in the Genoese Palazzo Rosso, made approximately fifteen years before the canvas by Agostino Carracci.

== Provenance ==
This painting was sold by Christie's New York January 29, 2014. It had previously been on loan to the Minneapolis Institute of Art from 1988-2013. It had been with Mattheisen Fine Art Ltd., London before being sold to an American collector.
