= Palazzo Fava, Bologna =

Palace in Bologna

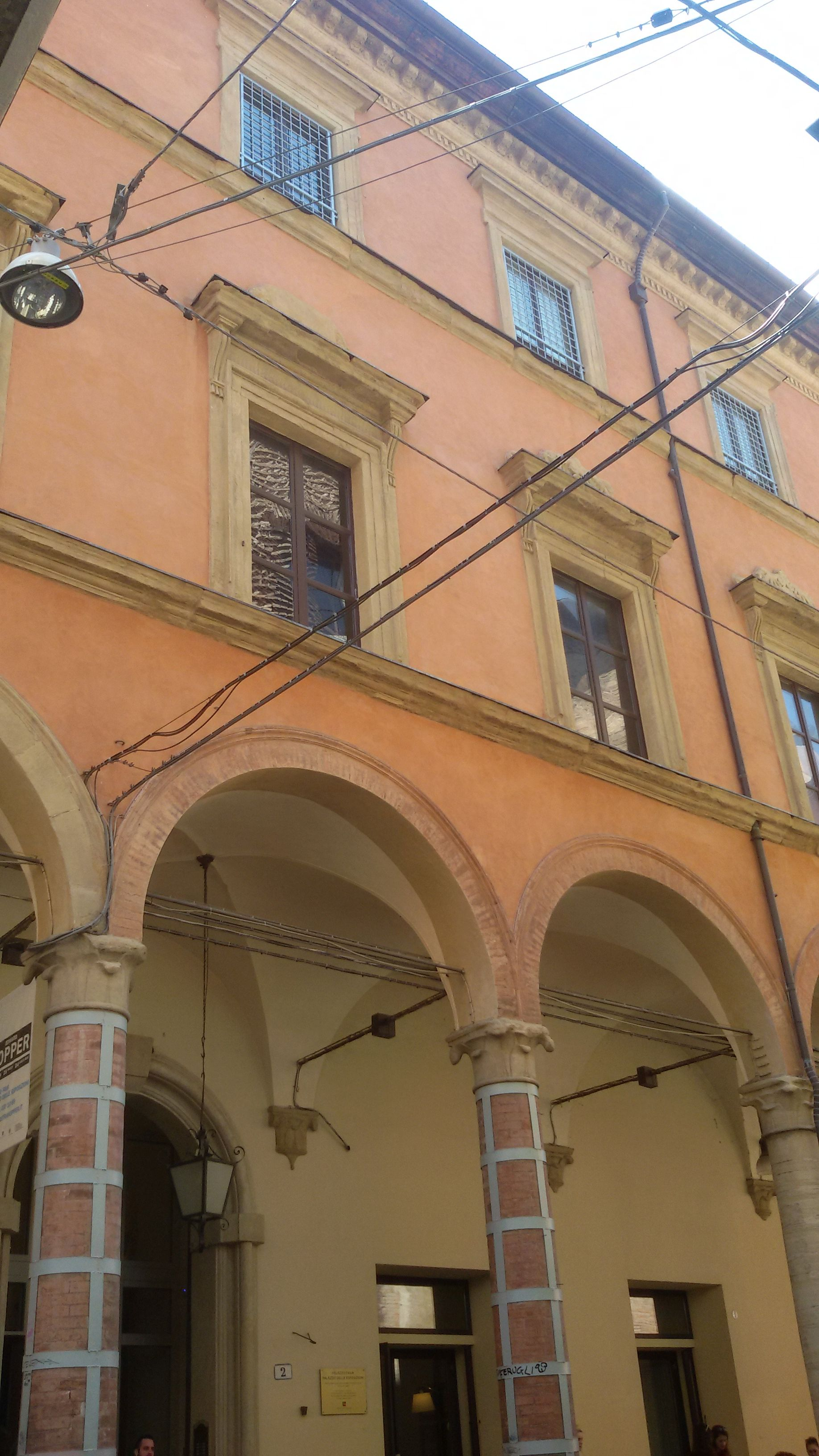
Its facade

Palazzo Fava or Palazzo Fava-Ghisilieri is a historic palace at 2 via Manzoni in Bologna, now housing art exhibitions and the Caffè Letterario Carracci Fava. It is most notable for its three rooms of frescoes of scenes from the lives of Jason, Medea, Europa and Aeneas by Ludovico Carracci, Agostino Carracci and Annibale Carracci, commissioned in 1584 by Filippo Fava - he was introduced to them by his tailor Antonio, Agostino and Annibale's father.

== History ==
The palace was already old when acquired by the Fava family in 1546. The present structure was built during the Renaissance, with important restorations by Filippo Fava, who received a major dowry on his marriage to Ginevra Orsi.

== Palazzo delle Esposizioni ==
After restoration the building opened on 28 January 2011 with the inaugural exhibition Palazzo Fava. Palazzo delle Esposizioni, displaying works from the Fondazione Carisbo's collections across several floors. It formed part of the wider Bologna si rivela event and was curated by the art critic Philippe Daverio. The works were organised as:

- Ground Floor: Modern and Contemporary Collections of the Fondazione Carisbo
- Piano nobile: Old Masters of the Fondazione Carisbo
- Piano galleria: Bologna yesterday and today - how a city changes
- Library: When la Cina was far off: 1904-1947

It has 2.600 m² of display space and is part of the Genus Bononiae. Musei nella Città trail, created by Fabio Roversi Monaco, then president of the Fondazione Cassa di Risparmio in Bologna.

=== Exhibitions ===
- Tiziano Terzani Clic! 30 anni d'Asia. La mostra, curated by Folco Terzani (30 June 2011 - 16 October 2011).
- I 1000 di Garibaldi, quelli che vollero inventare l'Italia (for the 150th anniversary of Italian unification), curated by Philippe Daverio, Massimo Negri and Roberto Guerri (8 July 2011 - 20 October 2011).
- Quadri di un'esposizione. Pittura barocca nella collezione del maestro Francesco Molinari Pradelli, curated by Angelo Mazza (21 June 2012 - 7 October 2012).
- Nino Migliori a Palazzo Fava. Antologica, curated by Graziano Campanini (18 January 2013 - 28 April 2013).
- Arturo Martini. Creature, il sogno della terracotta, curated by Nico Stringa (22 September 2013 – 12 January 2014).
- La ragazza con l'orecchino di perla. Il mito della Golden Age. Da Vermeer a Rembrandt. Capolavori dal Mauritshuis, curated by Marco Goldin (8 February 2014 - 25 May 2014).
- Max Klinger. L'inconscio della realtà, curated by Paola Giovanardi Rossi and Francesco Poli (25 September 2014 – 11 January 2015).
- Da Cimabue a Morandi. Felsina Pittrice, curated by Vittorio Sgarbi (14 February 2015 - 30 August 2015).
- Guido Reni e i Carracci. Un atteso ritorno, curated by Sergio Guarino (5 December 2015 - 13 March 2016).
- Edward Hopper, curated by Barbara Haskell (25 March 2016 - 24 July 2016).
- Bologna dopo Morandi 1945-2015, curated by Renato Barilli (23 September 2016 - 8 January 2017)
- Costruire il Novecento. Capolavori della Collezione Giovanardi, curated by Silvia Evangelisti (23 February 2017 - 25 June 2017).
- Astrid Kirchherr with the Beatles, curated by Kai-Uwe Franz (06 July 2017 - 09 October 2017).
- México. La Mostra Sospesa. Orozco Rivera Y Siqueiros (19 October 2017 - 18 June 2018).
- Sergio Vacchi. Mondi Paralleli, curated by Marco Meneguzzo (28 September 2018 - 25 November 2018).
