= Antonio Carracci =

Italian painter (1583–1618)

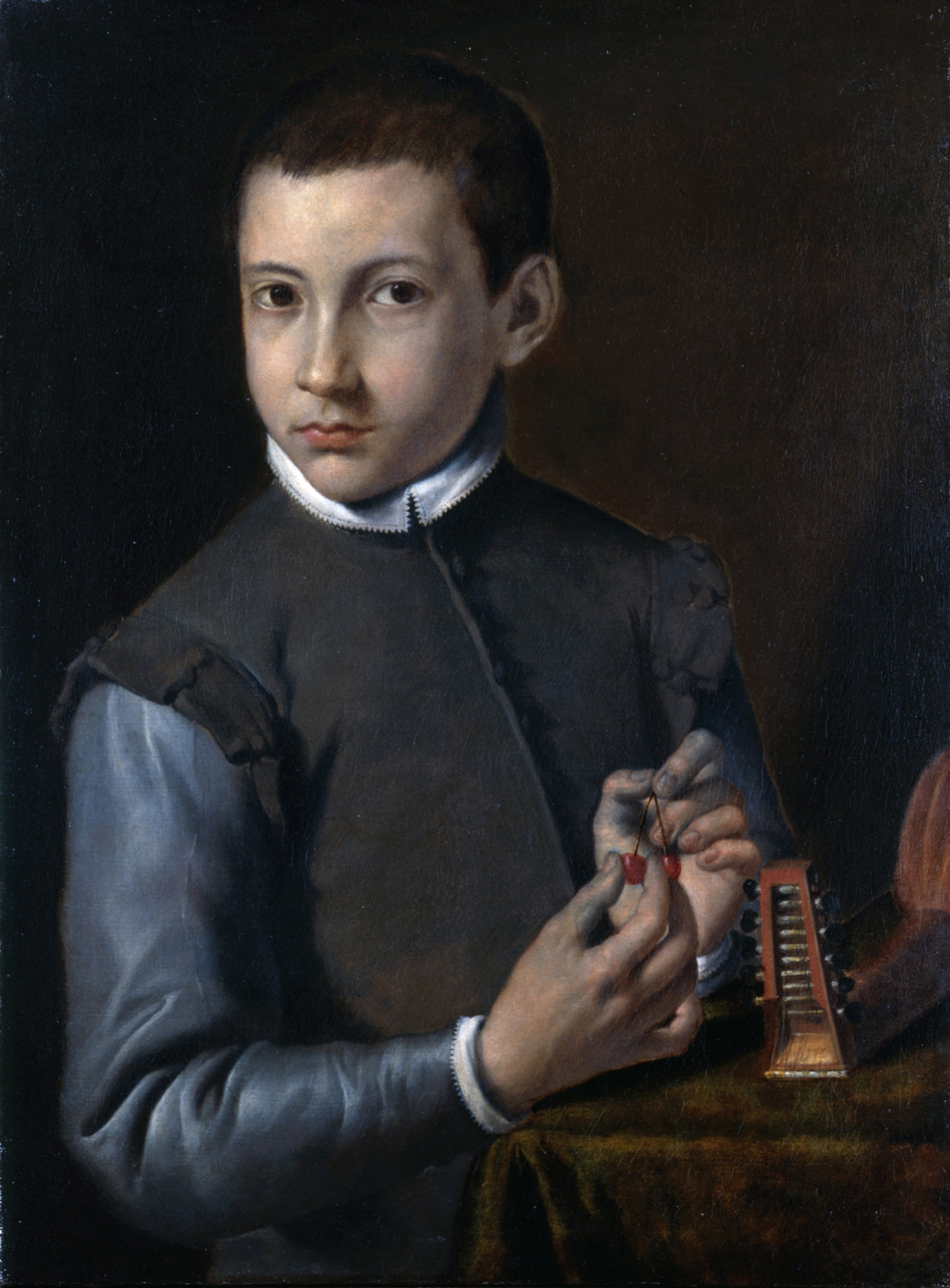
- Portrait by Agostino Carracci, c. 1590s
- Born: Antonio Marziale Carracci; 1583; Venice, Republic of Venice
- Died: 8 April 1618 (aged 34–35); Rome, Papal States
- Known for: Painting
- Movement: Baroque
- Father: Agostino Carracci
- Relatives: Annibale Carracci (uncle); Ludovico Carracci (first cousin once removed); Francesco Carracci (first cousin)

Antonio Marziale Carracci (1583 – 8 April 1618) was an Italian painter. He was the natural son of Agostino Carracci.

== Life ==
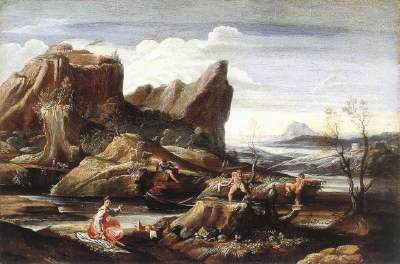
Landscape with Bathers. Palazzo Pitti, Florence.

Carracci was born in the parish of Santa Lucia in Venice, probably in 1583, the product of an affair with a courtesan called Isabella, occurring on his father's first visit to Venice. Giovanni Battista Agucchi, a friend and protégé of Cardinal Odoardo Farnese tells us in a 1609 letter (dated September 12) that Antonio was raised along with Sisto Badalocchio and a near contemporary to Domenichino and Lanfranco. The main Baroque artist biographers of his time, Baglione, Bellori and Malvasia, make some note of him.

He first apprenticed with his father. Malvasia recalls his father admired a Madonna and Child that completed at the age of seventeen. His uncle Annibale's 1590s Portrait of a Boy (Uffizi 1668 E) resembles those in Malvasia's woodcut with 1678 Felsina Pittrice. He may also be the boy in the Brera portrait group, including Annibale's father Mastro Antonio.

When his father died in 1602, Antonio moved to Rome to work under his uncle Annibale to whom he developed a deep affection. He likely worked on the frescoes of the Galleria Farnese, on the lunettes for the Palazzo Aldobrandini chapel, and probably in the Herrera Chapel. After his uncle's passing he received commissions in Rome from Cardinal Tonti and Cardinal Peretti-Montalto, including the Stanza del Diluvio in the Quirinal Palace, and major altarpieces like Madonna and Child with Saints (in Berlin) and the Galleria Corsini's Nativity.

The self-assurance of the letters he wrote to Cardinal Farnese and his father's old protector, Cardinal Spinola, after his uncle's death suggest they were written by Agucchi, who in his slightly later (September 12, 1609) letter to Dulcini all about Antonio, speaks of a career that is already well begun. Malvasia misquotes this letter and copies it as "[Antonio's work] seems that of a beginner" the MS actually says the opposite "il suo fare non pare da principiante". It is no surprise to see that Antonio speaks of the impegni that he already has, to read that he has learned enough ("tanto da tirarmi avanti da me stesso" ("so much that I can get on by myself"), and that he sees himself as maintaining the Carracci school in Bologna, and turning the studio to service to the Farnese.

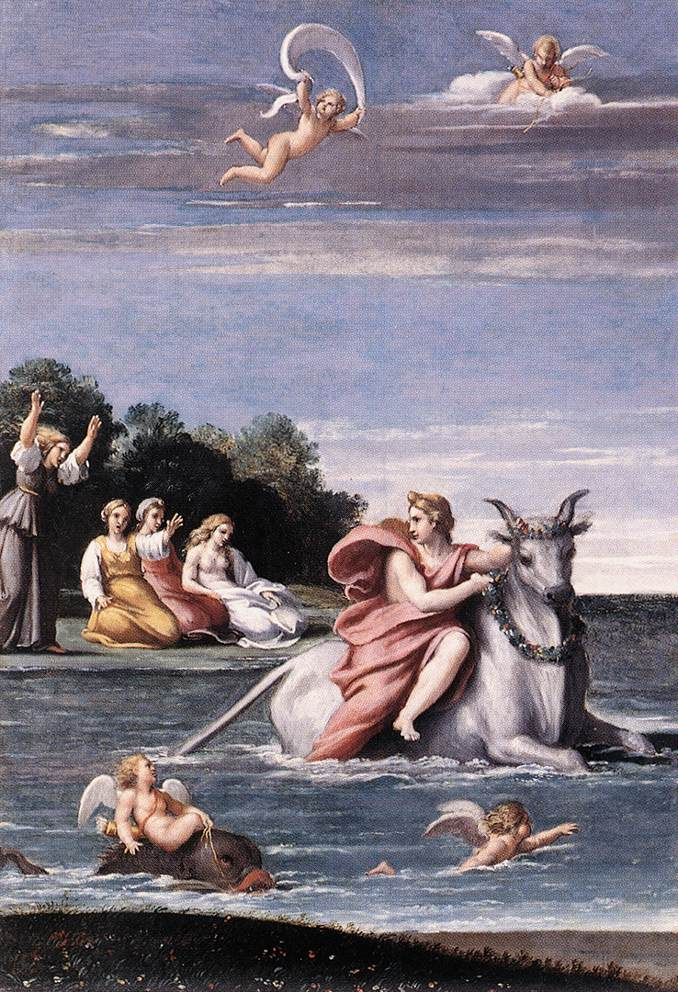
The Rape of Europa, oil on canvas. Pinacoteca, Bologna

Antonio inherited the studio against the claims of Annibale's surviving brother Giovanni Antonio, who contested the inheritance by throwing doubt on his nephew’s paternity. Despite gaining commissions, those from the Cardinal Pietro Aldobrandini, the main patron after the Farnese, declined once the cardinal's uncle Clement VIII died in 1605. This also coincides with the onset of Annibale's incapacitating illness. The ascent of the Borghese Pope, Paul V, continued the decline of the studio. By report, Annibale could not receive Cardinal Scipione Borghese, slipping out of a back door when he came to the studio; but Antonio was introduced to the pope's Prodatario, Cardinal Tonti, also an avid collector. Tonti employed Antonio to paint four chapels in his church; other public commissions included a chapel in Santa Maria in Monticelli, work in Sant' Girolamo dei Schiavoni, Santa Maria in Trastevere, and Sant' Sebastiano fuori le Mura, and in Palazzo Mattei. Antonio and Guido Reni collaborated in the decoration of the Cappella dell'Annunciata in the Palazzo Quirinal, painting a frieze of the Stanza del Diluvio. He contributed, around 1616, to the Alexander frescoes done for Cardinal Peretti Montalto; other works were done for Marchese Giustiniani, Cardinal Orsino, the Ludovisi, Cavalier Sachetti, Dionigio Buonavia in Bologna; and of course he was under the protection of Cardinal Odoardo Farnese, who recognized him as his ‘pittor di casa’ and paid him a monthly stipend.

Antonio was well known for doing cabinet-size compositions often based on the great variety of graphic material in possession of the Carracci studio. His masterpiece, The Deluge (presently in the Louvre), was one of Cardinal Mazarin's most prized pictures, and influential for Poussin's early Battle paintings as well as his paintings of the Seasons for Louis XIV 40 years later. With his Reni-like refinement, articulation of narrative, space, gesture and expression, the Deluge was an important academic collaboration with Agucchi.

Antonio was greatly admired by contemporaries, such that made his early death a particularly tragic loss. Recently, his reputation has declined, and he has been described as a small-scale and awkward mimic of his elder's works. His friend Giulio Mancini said he not only inherited Annibale's studio, but also "Herede dei suoi disegni et arte fù Antonio...". Antonio, being as Guido put it, the "ultima scintilla (del) valor Caraccesco" ("the last spark of the Carracci's value") had in fact more invested in the Carracci studio than anyone else.

The original of the much copied composition of the Martyrdom of St Denis (St Denis effrayant ses bourreaux) is evidently by Antonio, and the companion subject to his St Paul baptizing St Denis.

It was not an idle encomium on Mancini's part when he spoke that Antonio "mostrò gran segni di dover venir grande" ("showed visible signs that he would become great"). All the same, it was easy for his identity to be subsumed to that of elder Carracci. Because he shared the same initials as his father and uncle, and because the Carracci often collaborated, paintings by them were often confused. When Padre Resta gave the drawing of the Deluge, which he had had from Bellori, to Max Emmanuel of Bavaria, he was pleased to hear that the Elector treasured the gift and kept it on a table at his bedside; though believing it to be a painting by Annibale ("lo teneva per pittura d'Annibale").

== Selected works ==
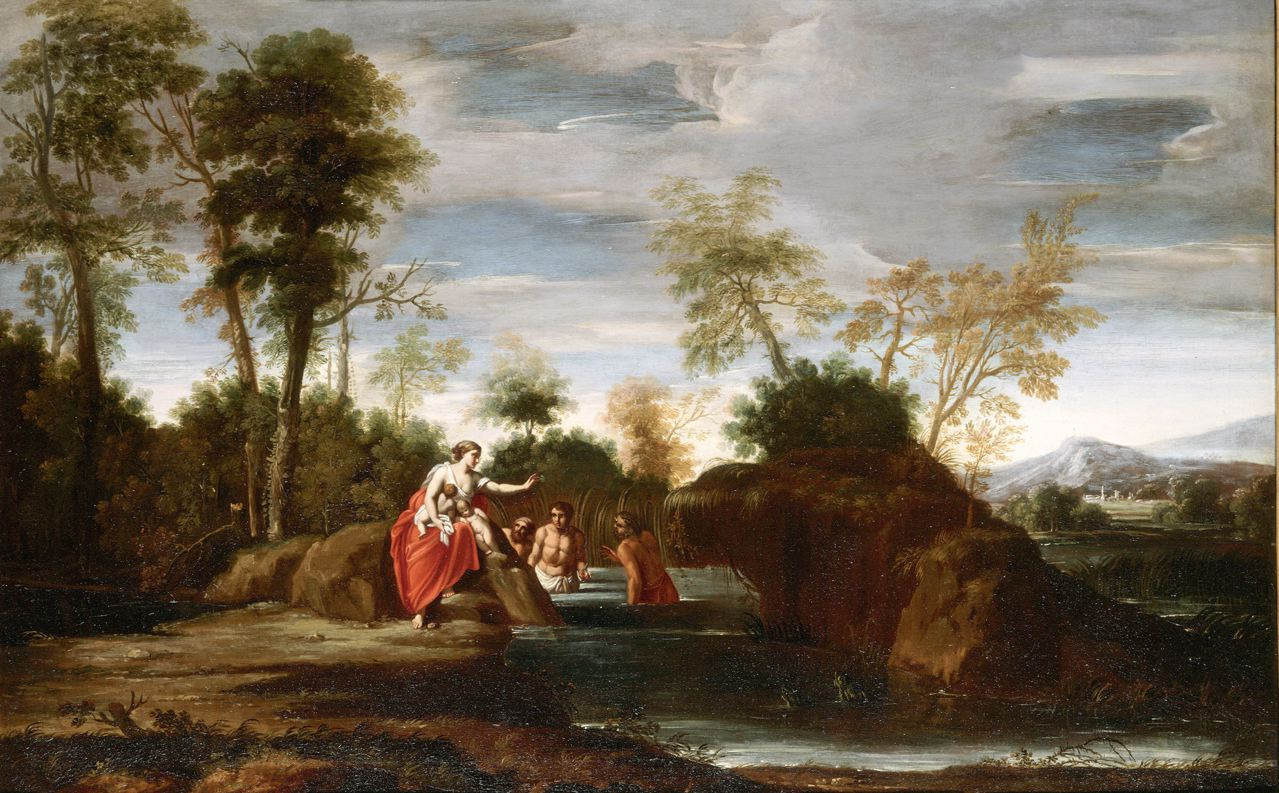
Latona, with Her Children Apollo and Diana, Turning the Lycian peasants into Frogs

- The Flood/The Deluge (Louvre, Paris)
- Latona, with Her Children Apollo and Diana, Turning the Lycian Peasants into Frogs (Whitfield Fine Art, London)
- Landscape with Bathers (Museum of Fine Arts, Boston)
- The Martyrdom of Saint Stephen (National Gallery, London)
- Christ Healing a Blind Man (Galleria Estense, Modena)
- Lute Player (Kunsthistorisches Museum, Vienna)

== See also ==
- Agostino Carracci, father
- Annibale Carracci, uncle
- Lodovico Carracci, father's cousin
- Francesco Carracci, cousin
