= Palazzo Sampieri Talon =

The Palazzo Sampieri Talon is a palace located on Strada Maggiore in Bologna, region of Emilia Romagna, Italy.

== History ==
The palace was built (1542-1554) at the site of a prior building by Vincenzo Sampieri, who was married to Elena Fantuzzi. One of Vicenzo's sons, the Count Astorre, Abbot of Santa Lucia di Roffeno and Canon of San Pietro returned to this palace in 1593, and commissioned decorations of scenes from the Bible and Mythology (1593–1594) from Annibale, Ludovico, and Agostino Carracci. The first documentation we have for the frescoes was a speech in 1603 given after Agostino's death.

Some of the frescoes were detached and sold. The three paintings depicting Christ and Woman of Cana (Ludovico), Christ and the adulteress (Agostino) and Christ and the Samaritan woman (Annibale), sold to Eugene de Beauharnais, are preserved since 1811 at the Pinacoteca di Brera.

In 1849, the last descendant Sampieri, Carolina, daughter of Francis and Anna de Gregorio, wife of Denis Talon. In 1865, the noblewoman called a Tuscan "expert" to detach more frescoes: the project was quickly blocked by the authorities, but the Talon continued to try. Fortunately, the failed. The palace contains some large canvases with scenes of landscape dotted with tiny figures.
