= Francesco Carracci =

Italian painter (1595–1622)

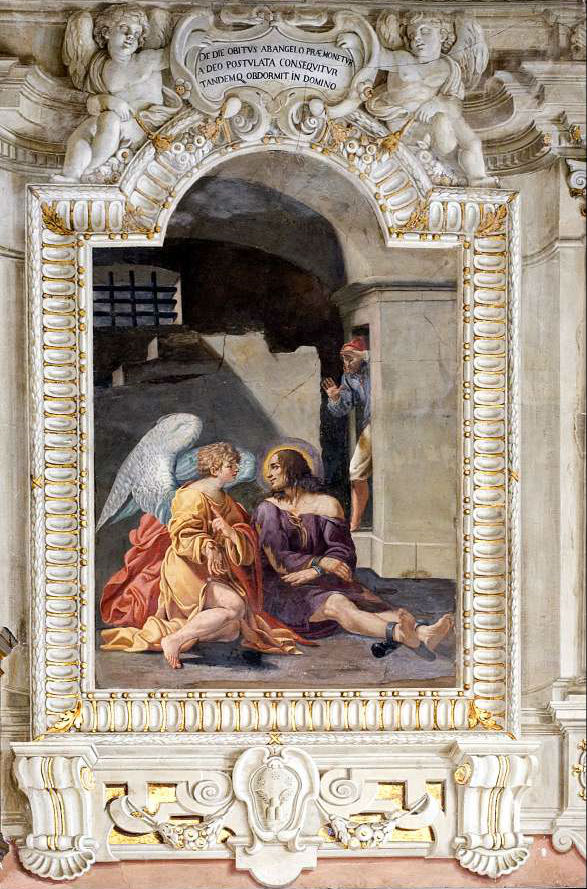
Saint Roch is comforted by an angel, by Francesco Caracci.

Francesco Carracci (1595 – 3 June 1622) was an Italian painter and engraver, and nephew of the more famous Agostino Carracci.

== Life ==
Carracci was the son of Giovanni Antonio Carracci, in Bologna, 1595. His father was a brother of Agostino and Annibale Carracci. Francesco was a youth of great talent and promise. He was taught by Ludovico, cousin of Agostino, in the Academy of the Incamminati, but left the school to start one in opposition to his teacher, calling it the "True School of the Carracci". Like the other members of the Carracci family he taught, engraved, and painted. His Adoration in the Church of Santa Maria Maggiore, Bologna, is not only his masterpiece but an excellent piece of vigorous painting. The "True School" was not a success, and, his students left him, Francesco went to Rome and made another attempt to found an academy, only to fail again. He left a few engravings after the works of Lodovico and Annibale. He died in abject poverty in Rome, 1622.

== See also ==
- Agostino Carracci, uncle
- Annibale Carracci, uncle
- Lodovico Carracci, Agostino's cousin
- Antonio Carracci, son of Agostino, Francesco's cousin
