= Clovis Whitfield =

British art historian and art dealer

Clovis Whitfield

Clovis Whitfield is an art historian and art dealer based in London, where he runs Whitfield Fine Art. He is a member of the Society of London Art Dealers.

== Career as art historian ==
Educated at Corpus Christi College, Cambridge and then the Courtauld Institute of Art, London. He was later a visiting professor at Indiana University, 1967/1968. In the course of his career, Whitfield has organised art exhibitions and lectured at important museums around the world, including the Royal Academy, London and the Capitoline Museums Rome.

Whitfield has published on Baroque Art extensively since 1971, notably discovering Temps Calme by Nicolas Poussin in The Burlington Magazine in 1977 and organising and writing the catalogue of Painting in Naples 1606 – 1705, Caravaggio to Giordano held at the Royal Academy in 1982. He published 'Caravaggio's Eye' (Paul Holberton publishing) in 2011, an important study of the Italian artist Caravaggio and his use of the technology of his day.

As well as being the author of a number of books on art history, throughout his career he has been credited with identifications of several "lost" works by Baroque and Renaissance painters, including a disputed identification of Apollo the Luteplayer by Caravaggio and Madonna and Child with the Infant Saint John the Baptist by Andrea del Sarto. In 2007 Whitfield's gallery removed a loan of paintings from the New York gallery Salander-O'Reilly a few hours before the opening of a major exhibition of old master paintings, due to concerns over the "uncertain legal situation" confronting the New York gallery.

== Whitfield Fine Art ==
Clovis Whitfield founded Whitfield Fine Art, in 1979 located on Old Bond Street, Mayfair, London. It moved to a new 2,000-square-foot (190 m^{2}) space on the first floor of 23 Dering Street in 2009. The gallery specialises in Italian Old Master paintings. It participates in a number of art fairs worldwide.

== Exhibitions organised ==
England and the Seicento, Agnew's, 1973, (Bolognese painting in England).

Painting in Florence, Royal Academy, London, 1979.

Painting in Naples, Caravaggio to Giordano, Royal Academy, London, 1982; National Gallery, Washington, D.C., 1983; Grand Palais, Paris, 1983; Palazzo Reale, Turin, 1983.

Classicismo e Natura: La Lezione di Domenichino Rome, Gallerie Capitoline, Nov 1996 – Feb. 1997 (jointly with Sir Denis Mahon)

== Publications ==
=== Books ===
"Caravaggio's Eye" Paul Holberton publishing, 2011

"Francesco Brizio; Prospetti e paesaggi", Atti dell’ Accademia Clementina, Bologna 1998;

=== Exhibition catalogues ===
"Cardinal Del Monte & Caravaggio" in Caravaggio, exh. cat., New York 2007, p. 37-43;

"Caravaggio and a New Technique" in Caravaggio, exh. cat., New York 2007, p. 23-36;

Caravaggio, exh. cat., Düsseldorf Kunsthalle 2006, cat. 7,11 & 33;

"Portraiture: From the ‘Simple Portrait’ to the ‘Resemblance Parlante" The Genius of Rome 1592 – 1623, exh. cat. London, Royal Academy, 2001 pp. 140–171;

Classicismo e Natura; La Lezione di Domenichino, exh. cat. ed. Sir Denis Mahon & C. Whitfield, Rome, Gallerie Capitoline 1996/97 (article on ‘Paesi dal natural rapportati’ and most of the catalogue entries);

Domenichino exhibition Catalogue, Rome, Palazzo Venezia, 1996 Catalogue entry on G.B. Viola’s Flight into Egypt p. 536/37;

Painting in Naples 1606 – 1705, Caravaggio to Giordano, exhibition catalogue, Royal Academy of Arts in association with Weidenfeld & Nicolson, London 1982;
