= Agostino Carracci =

Bolognese painter of the Baroque (1557–1602)

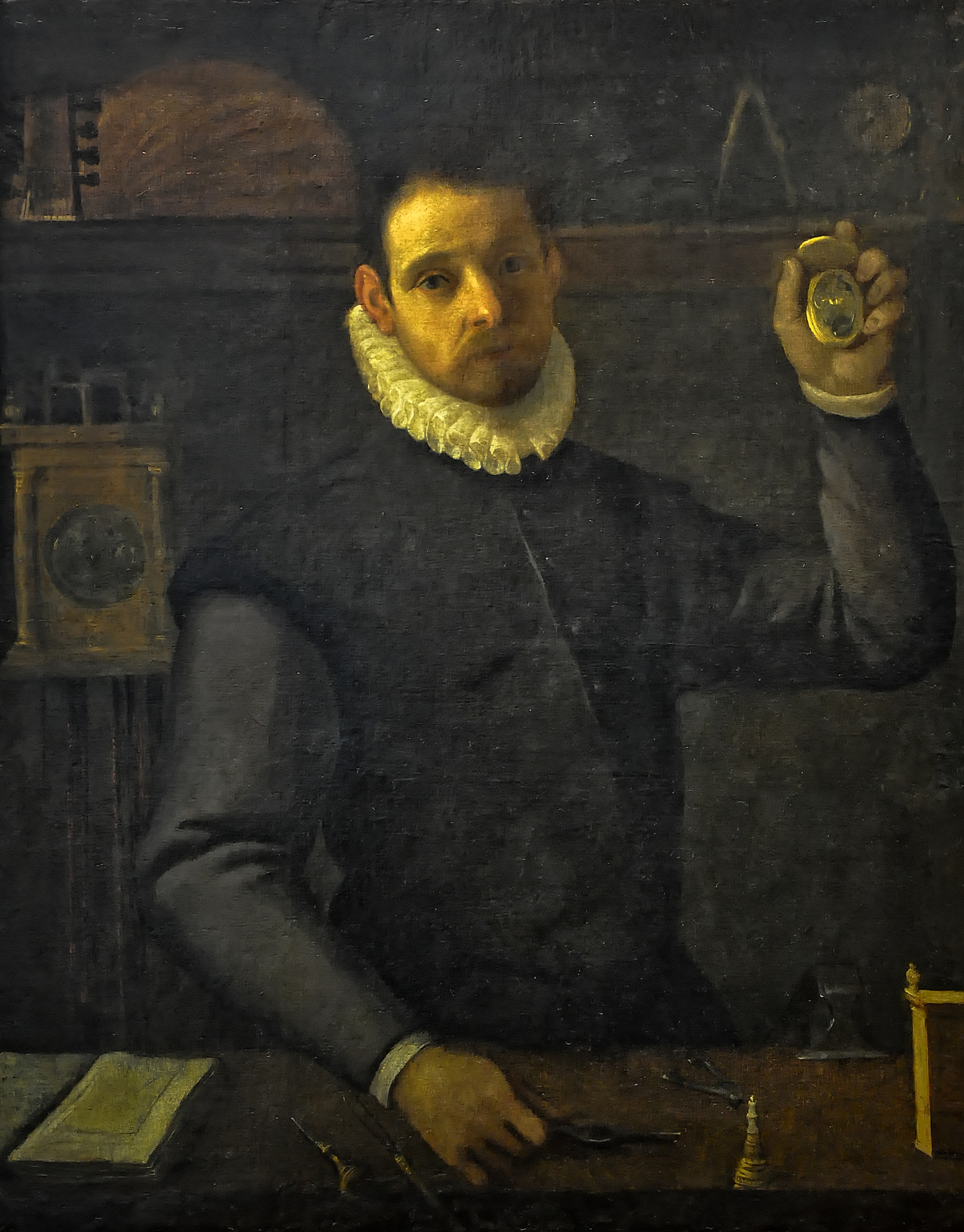
- Self portrait as a watchmaker
- Born: 16 August 1557; Bologna, Papal States
- Died: 23 March 1602 (aged 44); Parma, Duchy of Parma and Piacenza
- Known for: Painting
- Movement: Baroque
- Children: Antonio Marziale
- Relatives: Annibale Carracci (brother); Ludovico Carracci (cousin); Francesco Carracci (nephew)

Agostino Carracci (/kəˈrɑːtʃi/ kə-RAH-chee, UK also /kəˈrætʃi/ kə-RATCH-ee, Italian: [aɡoˈstiːno karˈrattʃi]; also Caracci; 16 August 1557 – 22 March 1602) was an Italian painter, printmaker, tapestry designer, and art teacher. He was, together with his brother, Annibale Carracci, and cousin, Ludovico Carracci, one of the founders of the Accademia degli Incamminati (Academy of the Progressives) in Bologna. Intended to devise alternatives to the Mannerist style favoured in the preceding decades, this teaching academy helped propel painters of the School of Bologna to prominence.

== Life ==
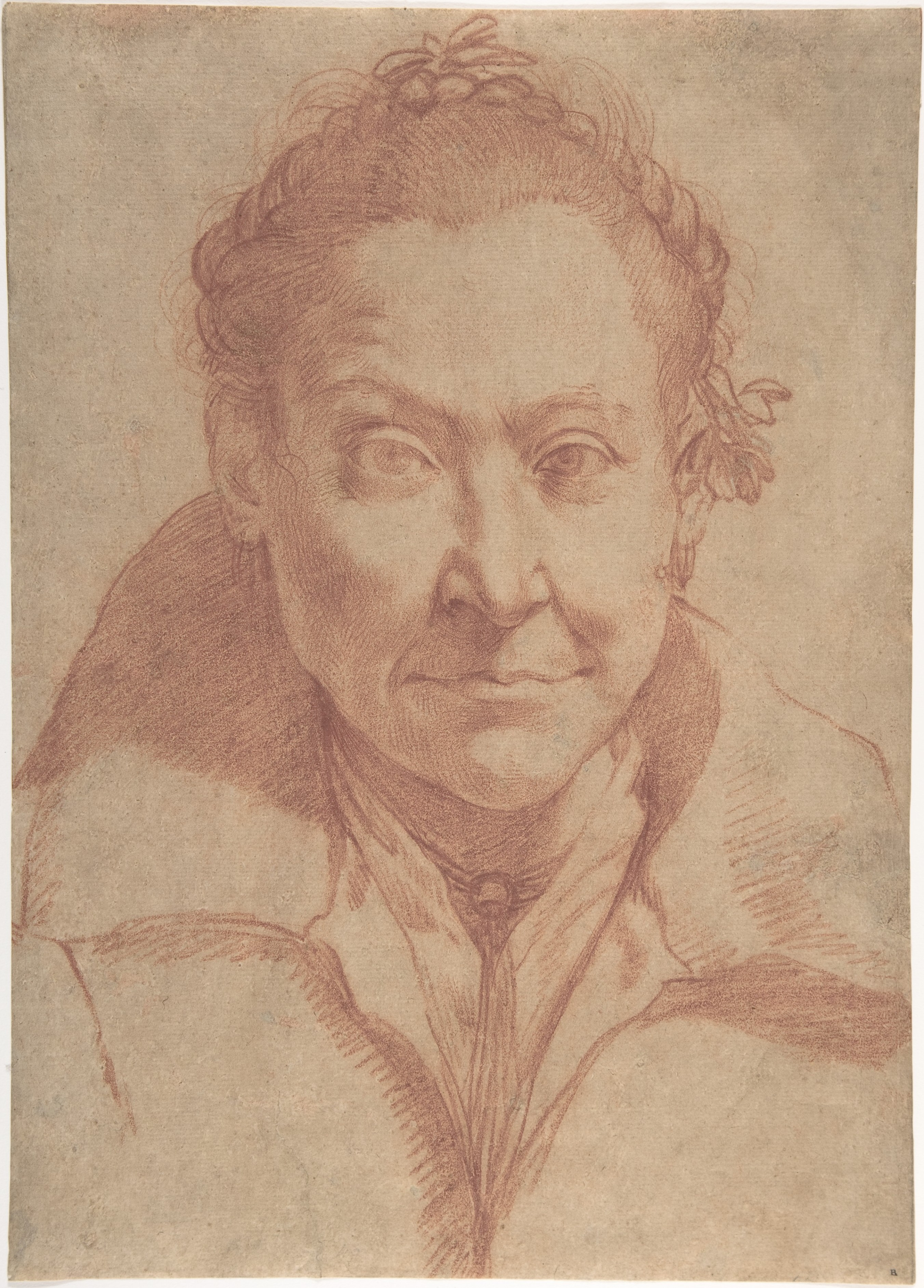
Bust-Length Portrait of a Woman

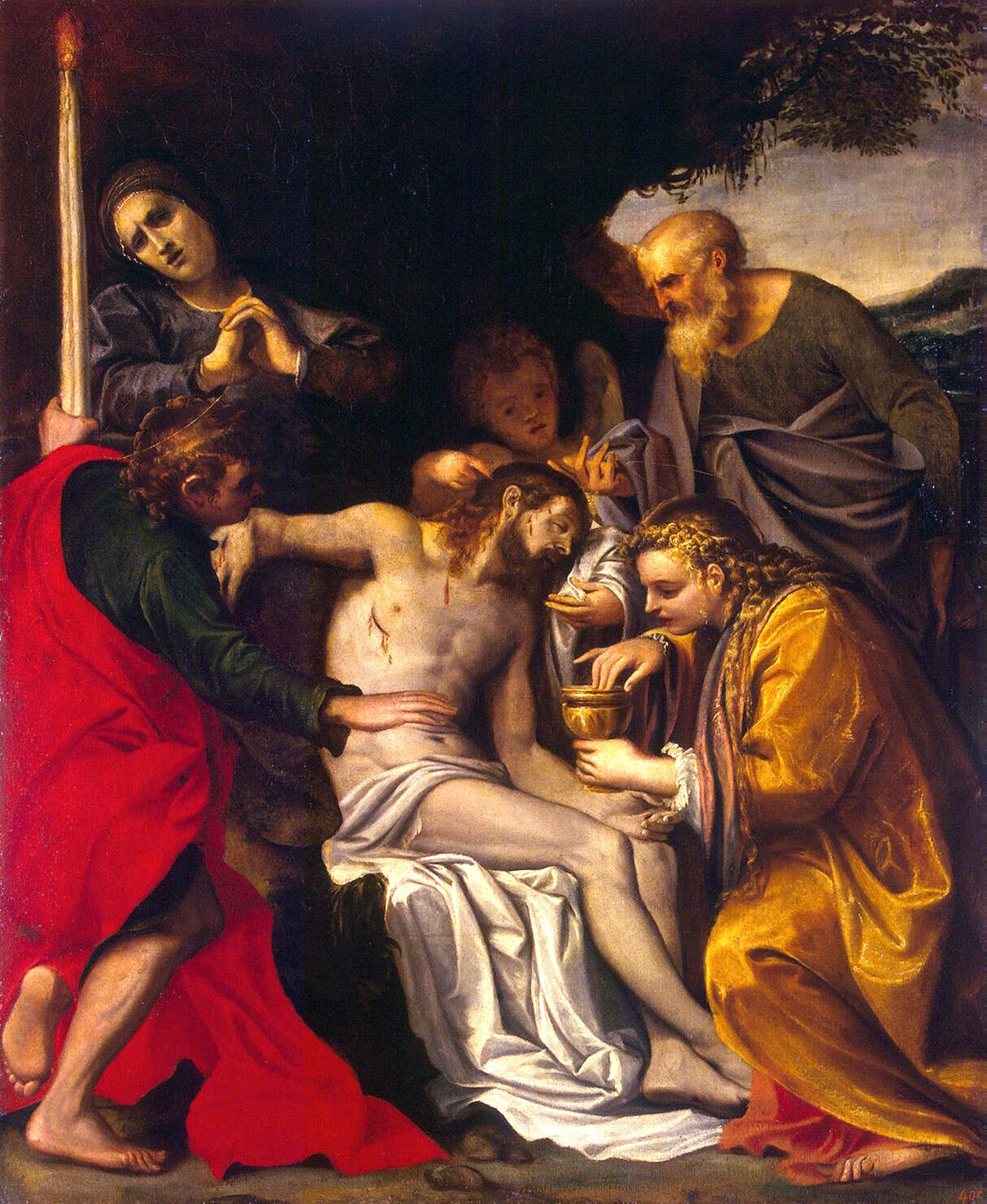
The Lamentation (c. 1586)

Agostino Carracci was born in Bologna as the son of a tailor. He was the elder brother of Annibale Carracci and the cousin of Ludovico Carracci. He initially trained as a goldsmith. He later studied painting, first with Prospero Fontana, who had been Lodovico's master, and later with Bartolomeo Passarotti. He travelled to Parma to study the works of Correggio. Accompanied by his brother Annibale, he spent a long time in Venice, where he trained as an engraver under the renowned Cornelis Cort. Starting from 1574 he worked as a reproductive engraver, copying works of 16th century masters such as Federico Barocci, Tintoretto, Antonio Campi, Veronese and Correggio. He also produced some original prints, including two etchings.

He travelled to Venice (1582, 1587–1589) and Parma (1586–1587). Together with Annibale and Ludovico he worked in Bologna on the fresco cycles in Palazzo Fava (Histories of Jason and Medea, 1584) and Palazzo Magnani (Histories of Romulus, 1590–1592). In 1592, he also painted the Communion of St. Jerome, now in the Pinacoteca di Bologna and considered his masterwork. In 1620, Giovanni Lanfranco, a pupil of the Carracci, famously accused another Carracci student, Domenichino, of plagiarising this painting. From 1586 is his altarpiece of the Madonna with Child and Saints, in the National Gallery of Parma. In 1598, Carracci joined his brother Annibale in Rome to collaborate on the decoration of the Gallery in Palazzo Farnese. From 1598 to 1600 is a triple Portrait, now in Naples, an example of genre painting. In 1600, he was called to Parma by Duke Ranuccio I Farnese to begin the decoration of the Palazzo del Giardino, but he died before it was finished. His friend the poet Claudio Achillini composed an epitaph, which was later published by Carlo Cesare Malvasia in the life of the Carracci.

Agostino's son Antonio Carracci was also a painter, and attempted to compete with his father's Academy.

An engraving by Agostino Carracci after the painting Love in the Golden Age by the 16th-century Flemish painter Paolo Fiammingo was the inspiration for Matisse's Le bonheur de vivre (Joy of Life).

== Critical evaluation ==
While his undoubted value in the graphic field is widely recognised, Agostino, as a painter, although admired by his contemporaries, ended up being overshadowed by the fame of his brother Annibale. Perhaps even his long practice of engraving ended up putting him at a disadvantage, since he might have been perceived as more inclined to copy than to create.

Even Giovanni Pietro Bellori, who included Agostino Carracci in his selective collection of biographies of artists (Vite de' pittori, scultori e architetti moderni, 1672), described his activity as a painter, with the sole exception of the Communion of Saint Jerome, a work that he praises, almost entirely limited to the role of supporting his younger brother Annibale, and reproaches him for having dedicated too much of his work to graphic production.

The modern critical evaluation of the painter Agostino Carracci probably still suffers from the negative legacies of the past. The fact that there is still only one important monograph dedicated to him published (Stephen E. Ostrow, from the United States, 1966, never translated into Italian), and that an individual exhibition on this artist has yet to be held, are probably significant factors that show that he remains an underrated artist.

However, there has been a positive critical reevaluation of the painter, since there is now a better awareness of his artistic role, alongside his more famous relatives, and the knowledge of his personal work is now greater.

== Works ==
Oil on canvas unless otherwise noted

- 1573 – Pietà (Muscarelle Museum of Art, Williamsburg, Virginia)
- 1586 – Madonna and Child with Saints (Galleria nazionale di Parma)
- c. 1586 – Lamentation or Pietà (Hermitage, St. Petersburg)
- c. 1589–1595 – Reciprico Amore (engraving, Baltimore Museum of Art)
- c. 1590 – Annunciation (Musée du Louvre, Paris)
- 1590–1595 – Portrait of a Woman as Judith (private collection)
- c. 1592–1593 – Assumption (Ss. Salvatore church, Bologna)
- 1592–1597 – The Last Communion of Saint Jerome (Pinacoteca Nazionale di Bologna)
- c. 1595 – Head of a Faun in a Concave (drawing in roundel, National Gallery of Art, Washington DC)
- 1598–1600 – Triple Portrait of Arrigo, Pietro and Amon (National Museum of Capodimonte, Naples)

=== Fresco collaborations with Annibale and Ludovico ===
- Life of Aeneas (Palazzo Fava, Bologna)
- Lives of Jason and Medea (Palazzo Fava, Bologna)
- Scenes from the Foundation of Rome (Palazzo Magnani, Bologna)
- Life of Hercules (Palazzo Sampieri Talon, Bologna)

=== Undated ===
- The Penitent Magdalen (private collection)
- Carracci's erotic work (prints)

== See also ==
- The Carracci

== Bibliography ==
- Stephen E. Ostrow, Agostino Carracci (1966), Thesis (Ph.D.) New York University, New York
