= Accademia degli Incamminati =

Art school in Bologna, Italy

Coordinates: 44.155417°N 11.787139°E

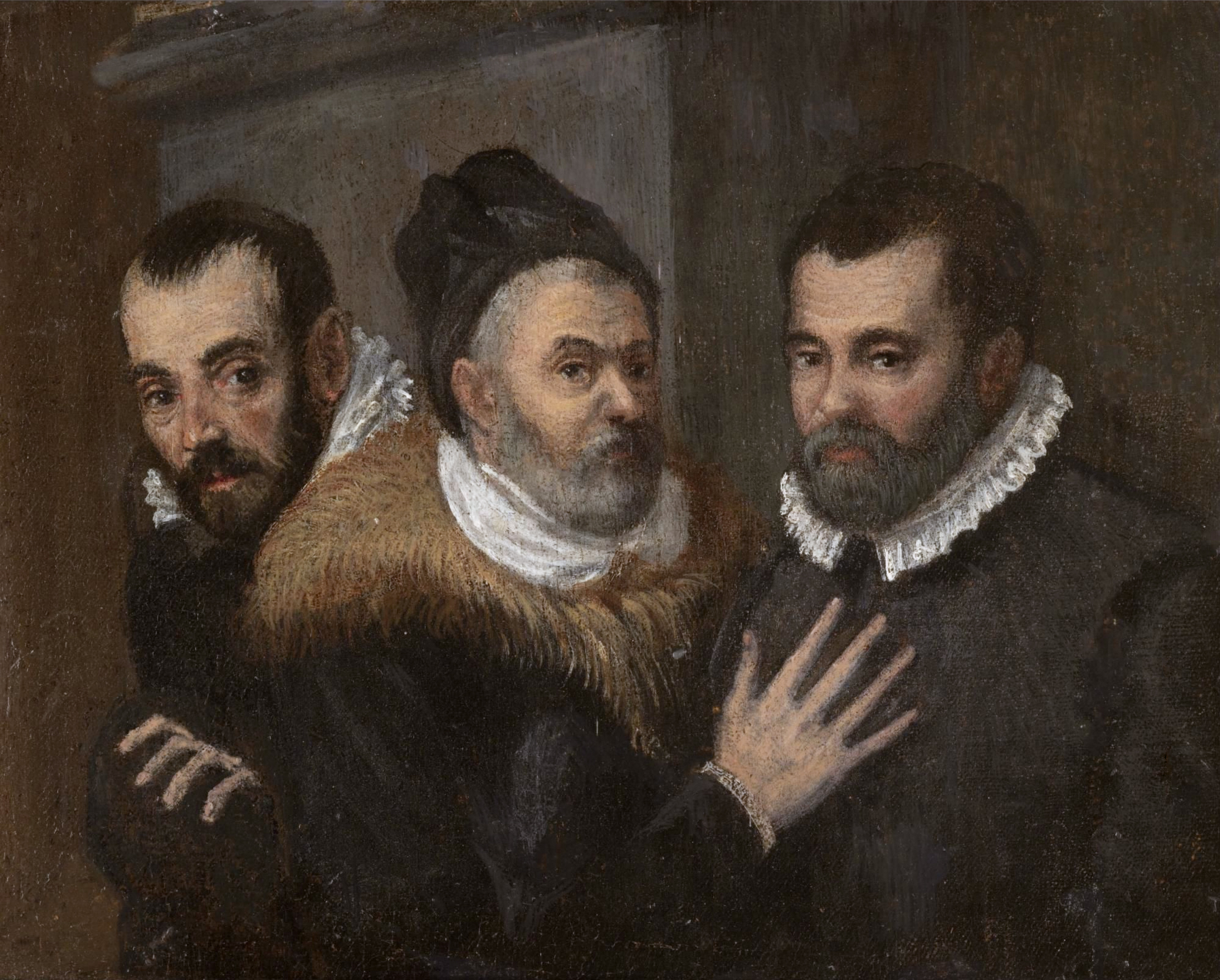
- Portrait of Annibale, Ludovico and Agostino Carracci, the founders of the Accademia degli Incamminati
- Abbreviation: Gli Incamminati
- Formation: 1582
- Founder: Annibale, Ludovico and Agostino Carracci
- Headquarters: Bologna, Papal States
- Official language: Italian
- Formerly called: Accademia dei Desiderosi

The Accademia degli Incamminati (Italian for "Academy of Those who are Making Progress" or "Academy of the Journeying") was one of the first art academies in Italy, founded in 1582 in Bologna.

== History ==
The academy was founded as the Accademia dei Desiderosi ("Academy of the Desirous") and sometimes known as the Accademia dei Carracci after its founders, the three Carracci cousins: Agostino, Annibale and Ludovico. Annibale headed the institution thanks to his strong personality.

The birth of this and other academies indicated artists' desire to be seen on the same level as poets and musicians, rather than as just artisans and the Accademia degli Incamminati soon providing a meeting space for other intellectuals, such as the doctor Melchiorre Zoppio and the astronomer Giovanni Antonio Magini, who both frequented it. On its foundation, its members soon chose a heraldic emblem for the institution, made up of a celestial sphere with Ursa Minor at its centre and below it the motto Contentione Perfectus. It was set up as a private institution of artists with the aim of providing a comprehensive training in the practice and theory both of art and of other activities then considered to be of little importance. In the Accademia artists were allowed to draw the nude from live models, which was prohibited by the Counter Reformation Catholic church. Considered "the first major art school based on life drawing", the Accademia was the model for later art schools throughout Europe.

The style the new academy was aiming for was "an eclectic ideal", taking (in the words of a sonnet from Agostino Carracci to Niccolò dell'Abbate) "from Raphael a feminine grace of line, from Michelangelo a muscular force, from Titian strong colours and from Correggio gentle colours. Giovanni Paolo Lomazzo also wrote on that style in his Idea del tempio della pittura (1591).

== Bibliography ==
- Strinati, Claudio (2001). Annibale Carracci (in Italian). Florence: Giunti Editore. ISBN 88-09-02051-0.
