= Palazzo Isolani, Bologna =

Palace in Italy

Coordinates: 44°29′32.08″N 11°20′53.07″E

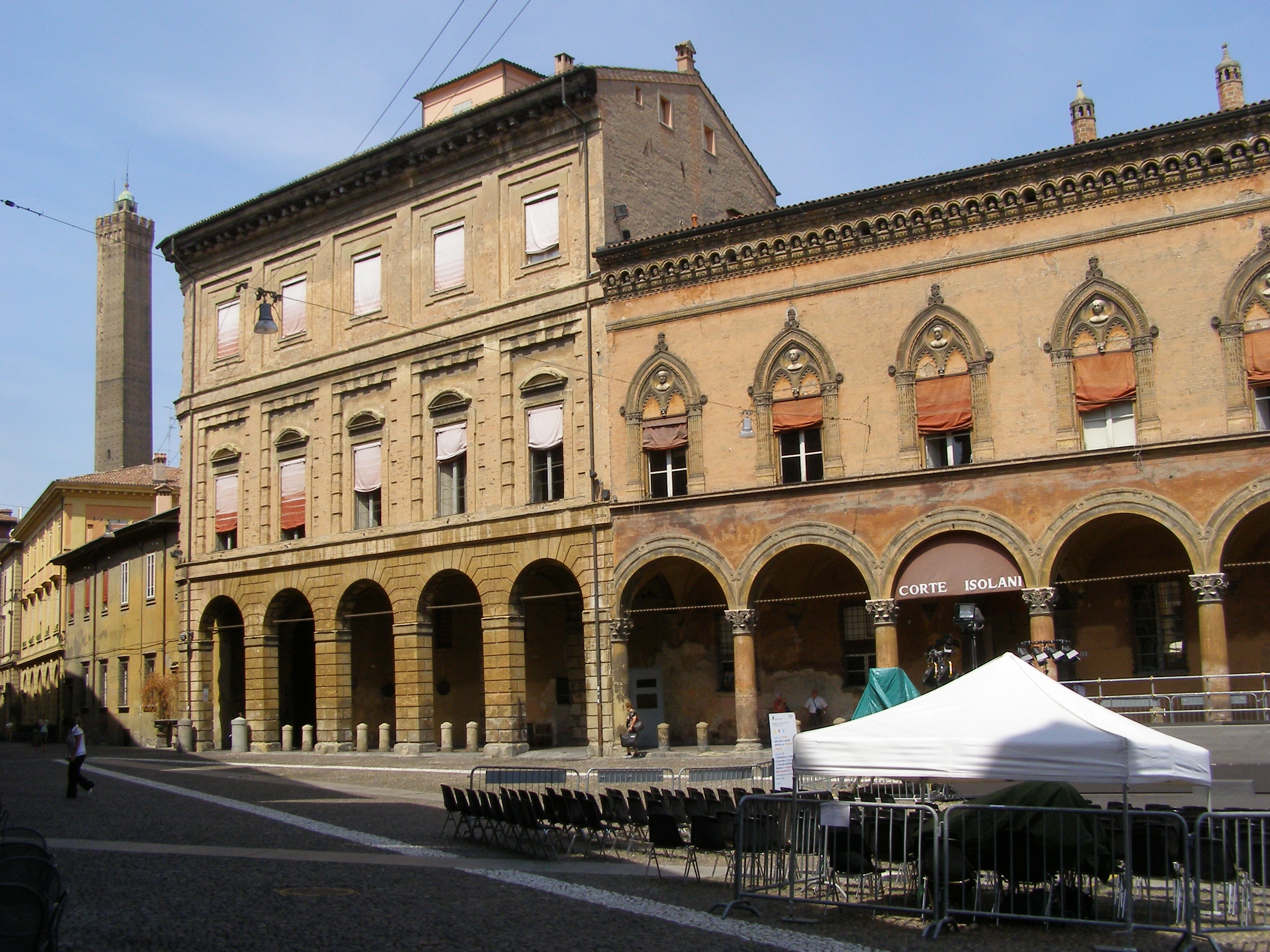
Palazzo Isolani (left) and Palazzo Bolognini Isolani (right)

The Palazzo Isolani is a palace located on located on Via Santo Stefano #16 facing Piazza Santo Stefano in the center of Bologna, region of Emilia-Romagna, Italy, with both Gothic and Renaissance architecture features.

== History ==
The palace was designed in 1451-55 by Pagno di Lapo Portigiani from Fiesole for the Bolognini family, a senatorial family enriched by the trade in silk. The ground-floor portico, held up by columns with corinthian capitals, is divided from the upper floor by a cornice. The windows above are mullioned with peaked arches. The 19th-century additions within the upper window arches of medallions with busts recall the effect on the Palazzo Bolognini Amorini Salina diagonally across the square.

The palace was acquired during the 18th century by the senatorial Isolani family, originally from the island of Cyprus. Descendants are still in possession of structure. The interior galleries (Corte Isolani) lead to shops and a boutique hotel.
