= Pagno di Lapo Portigiani =

Italian sculptor

Pagno di Lapo Portigiani (1408 — 1470) was an Italian Renaissance decorative sculptor, a minor follower of Donatello who worked on numerous occasions in projects designed and supervised by Michelozzo.

== Biography ==
Pagno di Lapo was born at Fiesole, near Florence.

In 1426-28 Pagno di Lapo was working as a stone-cutter in the joint shop of Donatello and Michelozzo in Pisa, during the production of the Coscia and Brancacci tombs. In 1428 he collaborated with two obscure stone-cutters on the decorative elements of the baptismal font in the Duomo of Siena, and as a garzone in Donatello's shop in connection with the resumed work on the pulpit for Prato, 1434. In Florence he was occupied between 1448 and 1451 with decorative carving executed concurrently for the Basilica of San Lorenzo and Palazzo Medici (both projects under Michelozzo again). Documents show that he was working on chapels for the Basilica of San Petronio in Bologna between 1451 and about 1469, never designated there as a scultore but as a stone-cutter or marble-worker. Nevertheless, he is credited with designing Palazzo Isolani on Piazza Santo Stefano, which was built between 1451-55.

Basing their attributions on Giorgio Vasari, a significant number of Early Renaissance sculptures have been associated with Pagno's name since the late nineteenth century, most notably the Madonna and Child at the Museo dell'Opera del Duomo. Modern scholars, however, assign to Michelozzo other sculptures Vasari assigns to Pagno di Lapo in the same passage, which Vasari had claimed for Michelozzo in the first edition of his Lives, and more recent documentation reassigns to Pagno di Lupo a less exalted role as a sculptor of decorative stonework.

When Piero de' Medici planned to commission a marble tabernacle in the Gothic Chiesa della Santissima Annunziata, the church of the Servi di Maria, Florence, he consulted Michelozzo, who seems to have provided the design, but left the execution of its architectural enframement to Pagno di Lapo, whose inscription runs round the inside of the architrave. Vasari, in noticing the inscription in time for his revision of Le Vite, revised his attribution of other sculptures at the Santissima Annunziata, attributing to Pagno metalwork that documents actually show to have been supplied by Maso di Bartolomeo, doubtless under Michelozzo's supervision; Vasari added to his attributions the Madonna and Child relief illustrated above, which was already in the Opera del Duomo. On this slender basis early twentieth-century scholars erected an increased oeuvre for Pagno di Lapo, until in 1942 H.W. Jansen related the relief to a group of reliefs of the Madonna and Child, recognized as by the youthful Agostino di Duccio, under the influence of Luca della Robbia.

The sole surviving identifiable work by Pagno di Lapo is the inscribed tabernacle frame, which Jansen found "shows him to have been a skillful carver of ornament, but the plastic décor of the structure contains so little of true sculpture that it yields small evidence of his artistic ability." Jansen considered the possibility that the altar table from the tabernacle, now in the Museo Bardini, Florence, was also Pagno's.
