= Palazzo Fantuzzi, Bologna =

Italian historic palace

Coordinates: 44.494281°N 11.350275°E

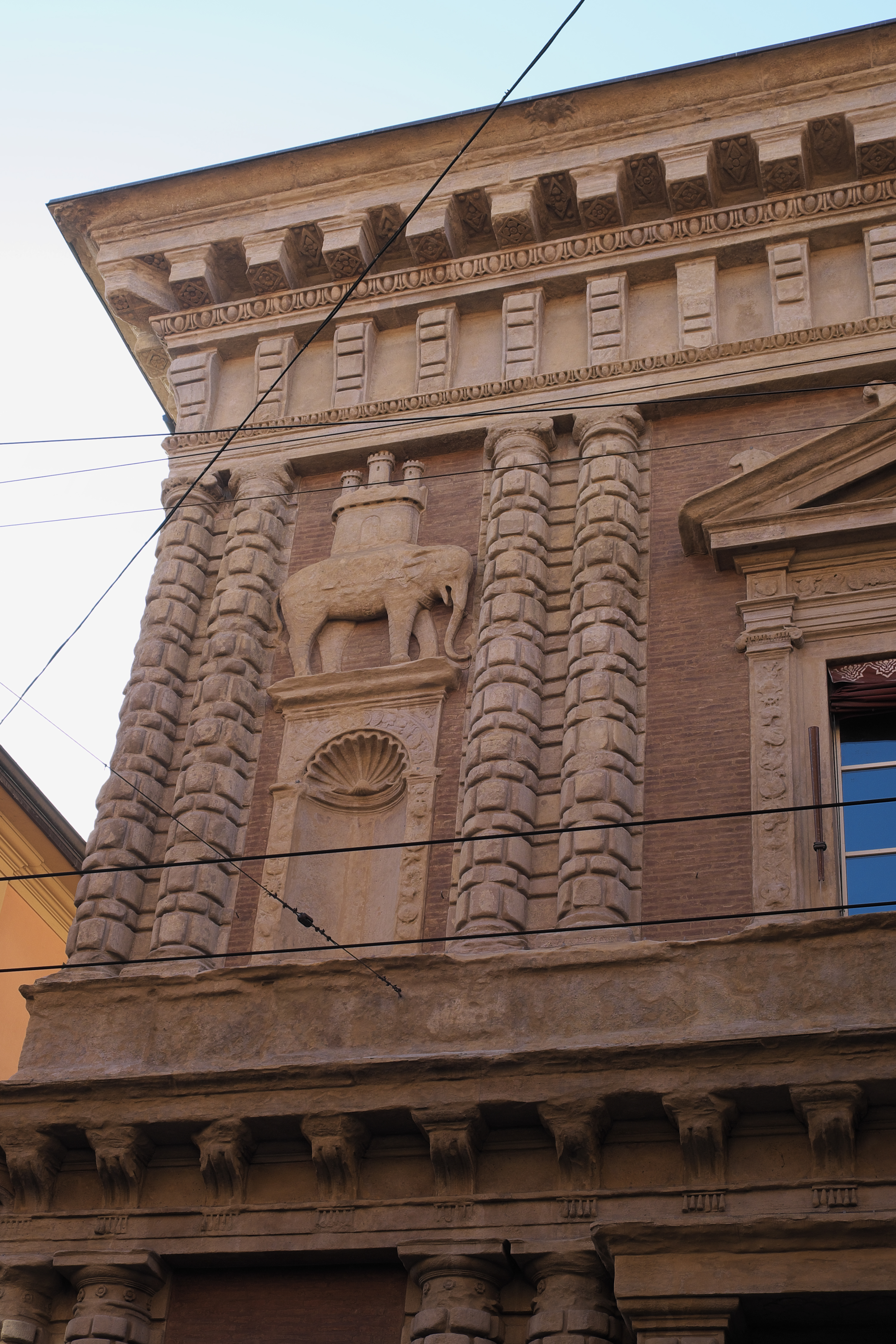
Detail of the sculpted coat of arms with elephant.

The Palazzo Fantuzzi is a monumental Renaissance style palace located on Via San Vitale number 23 in central Bologna, region of Emilia-Romagna, Italy. The palace is also known as the Palazzo degli Elefanti for its sculpted decoration, and it stands near the church of Santi Vitale e Agricola.

== History ==
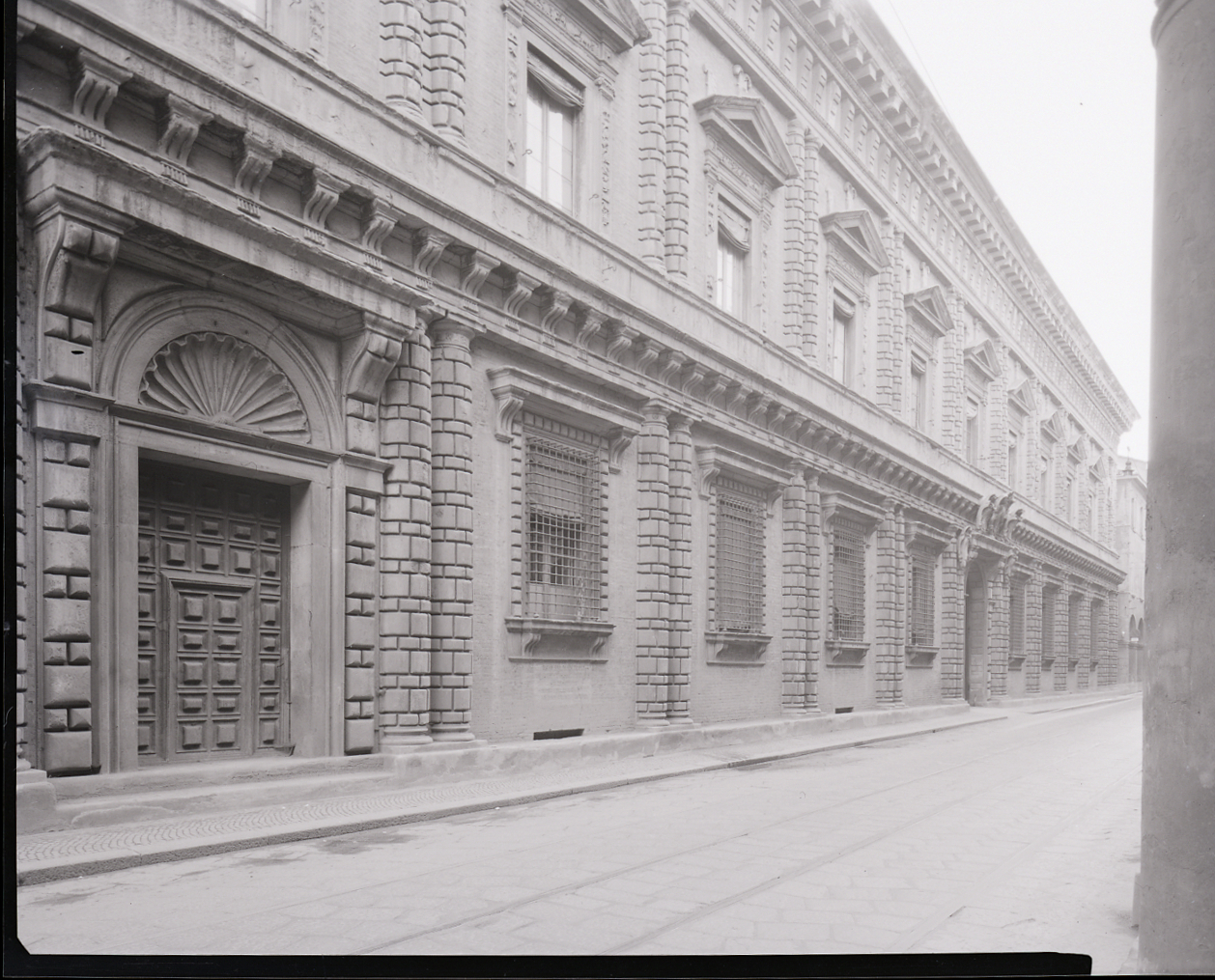
Front facade. Photo by Paolo Monti (1969)

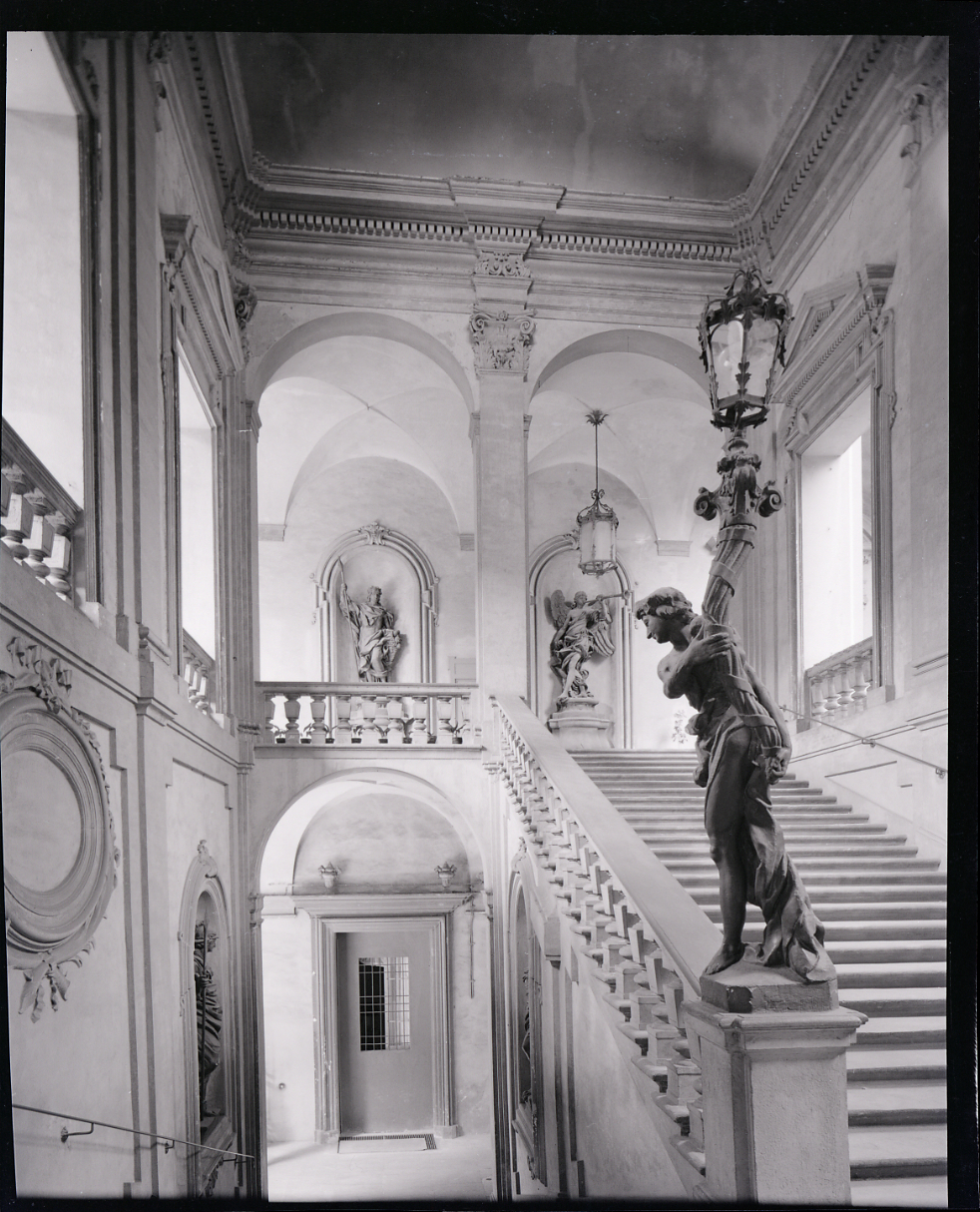
Interior. Photo by Paolo Monti (1969)

While attributed by some to Sebastiano Serlio or Baldassare Peruzzi, the palace was designed in 1517 by Andrea da Formigine. The facade with the ashlar columns was commissioned in 1521 by Francesco Fantuzzi; the carved elephants with towers above the corner niches refer to the senatorial family coat of arms. The coat of arms was a pun on the ele-fantuzzi family.

The interior courtyard has a monumental Baroque staircase designed in 1680 by Paolo Canali. The statuary at the top of the stairs is by Gabriele Bunelli. The ball room of the palace was frescoed (1684) with quadratura and Trompe-l'œil scenes by Francesco Galli Bibiena and other rooms were frescoed by Angelo Michele Colonna. Part of the palace is now used for exhibitions.
