= Formigine =

- Comune
- Comune di Formigine
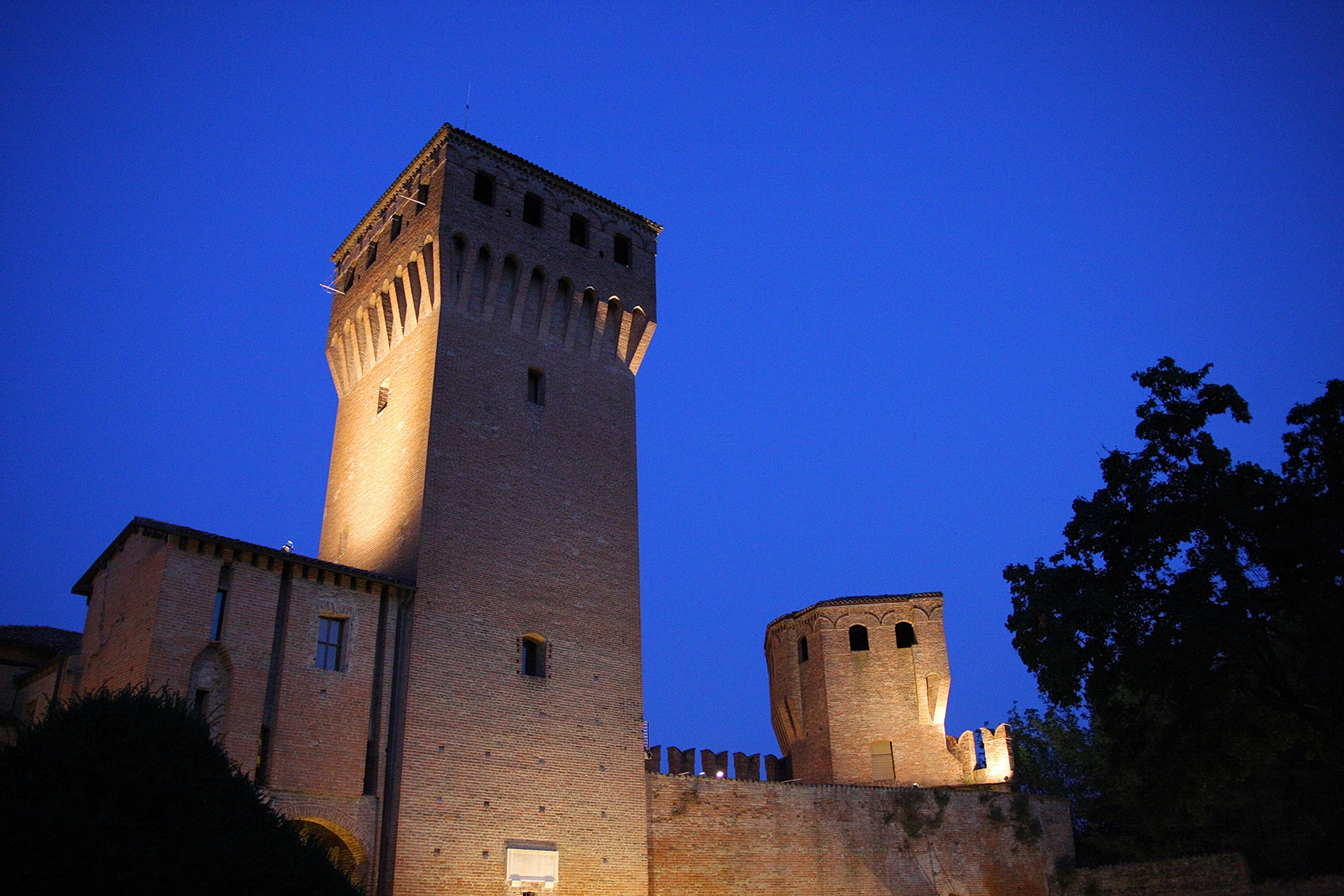

- Flag Coat of arms

- Location within Italy Location within Emilia-Romagna
- Coordinates: 44°36′26″N 10°56′0″E
- Country: Italy
- Region: Emilia-Romagna
- Province: Modena (MO)
- Frazioni: Casinalbo, Colombaro, Corlo, Magreta

Government
  - Mayor: Elisa Parenti

Area
  - Total: 46.74 km^{2} (18.05 sq mi)
- Elevation: 82 m (269 ft)

Population (July 2026)
  - Total: 34,486
  - Density: 737.8/km^{2} (1,911/sq mi)
- Demonym: Formiginesi
- Time zone: UTC+1 (CET)
  - Summer (DST): UTC+2 (CEST)
- Postal code: 41043
- Dialing code: 059
- Patron saint: St. Bartholomew
- Saint day: 24 August
- Website: Official website

Formigine (Modenese: Furméżen) is a town and comune in the province of Modena, Emilia-Romagna, Italy. As of July 2026, Formigine had an estimated population of 34,486.

== History ==
=== Bronze Age ===
The earliest evidence of human occupation in the territory of modern-day Formigine dates to the Middle and Recent Bronze Age (c. 1550–1150 BC), with the Terramare settlement of Casinalbo. Of this settlement, its necropolis is particularly relevant. Being the most well documented Terramare funerary site to date, it has yielded more than 670 excavated burials and is estimated to have originally contained over 3,000 graves.

The Bronze Age settlement at Casinalbo was abandoned around 1150 BC as part of the wider collapse of the Terramare culture, a process that affected much of the central Po Valley and is linked to a combination of demographic, environmental, and socio-political factors.

=== Iron Age ===
During the Iron Age, the Etruscans populated the region, but did not establish any notable settlement, with only minor archeological findings in the region.

In the 4th century BC, the territory came under the control of the Celtic Boii, who settled in the southern Po Valley after displacing the Etruscans. Archaeological evidence suggests that the initial conquest was followed by a gradual integration between the Celtic newcomers and the surviving Etruscan communities before the Roman conquest.

=== Roman period ===
Following the Roman conquest, the countryside was reorganized through Roman Centuriation, a system of land division into regular plots served by roads and drainage channels. Traces of this ancient landscape organization remain visible in the alignment of some modern roads, waterways and agricultural boundaries. Despite this, no proper settlement beyond agricultural purposes was made during Roman times.

=== Early Middle Ages ===
Following the end of Roman rule, the territory remained predominantly rural. Archaeological excavations have shown that the earliest medieval nucleus of Formigine developed around a small church and its cemetery, forming a village that predated the construction of the castle. The church served as the centre of the local community and was surrounded by a cemetery used for several centuries.

=== High Middle Ages ===
In 1201, during a conflict between Modena and Reggio Emilia, the Comune of Modena constructed the Castle of Formigine as a frontier fortress. Archaeological investigations have shown that the castle incorporated and reorganized an existing village centred on the earlier church, which subsequently developed into the medieval town.

== Main sights ==
- Medieval castle (thirteenth century) in the Town centre.
- Villa Gandini, in the 'Park of the Resistance' Via San Antonio (now housing the public library)
- Hermit Enrico's house (now museum)
- San Bartolomeo Church in the Town centre opposite the Castle.

== People ==
- Andrea da Formigine (circa 1485 - 1559), Italian architect of the Renaissance period, active mainly in Bologna.
- Cristian Zaccardo, World Cup-winning footballer
- Riccardo Riccò, cyclist

== Twin towns – sister cities ==
Formigine is twinned with:

- (Republic of Ireland) Kilkenny, Ireland
- Saumur, France
- Verden, Germany
