= Andrea da Formigine =

Italian architect (c. 1485–1559)

Andrea Marchesi da Formigine, also called "Andrea da Formigine" or "Il Formigine" (Formigine, c. 1485–1559) was an Italian architect, sculptor and carver of the Renaissance period, active mainly in Bologna, Italy. Father of Jacopo da Formigine.

He was born in Formigine, near Modena. He was central in the design of a palace at the site of Santi Bartolomeo e Gaetano; the Palazzo Fantuzzi; Palazzo Dal Monte; and the Palazzo Bolognini Amorini Salina, all in Bologna. He reputedly helped sculpt the capitals for the portico of the latter palace with Properzia de' Rossi.
