= Palazzo Dal Monte, Bologna =

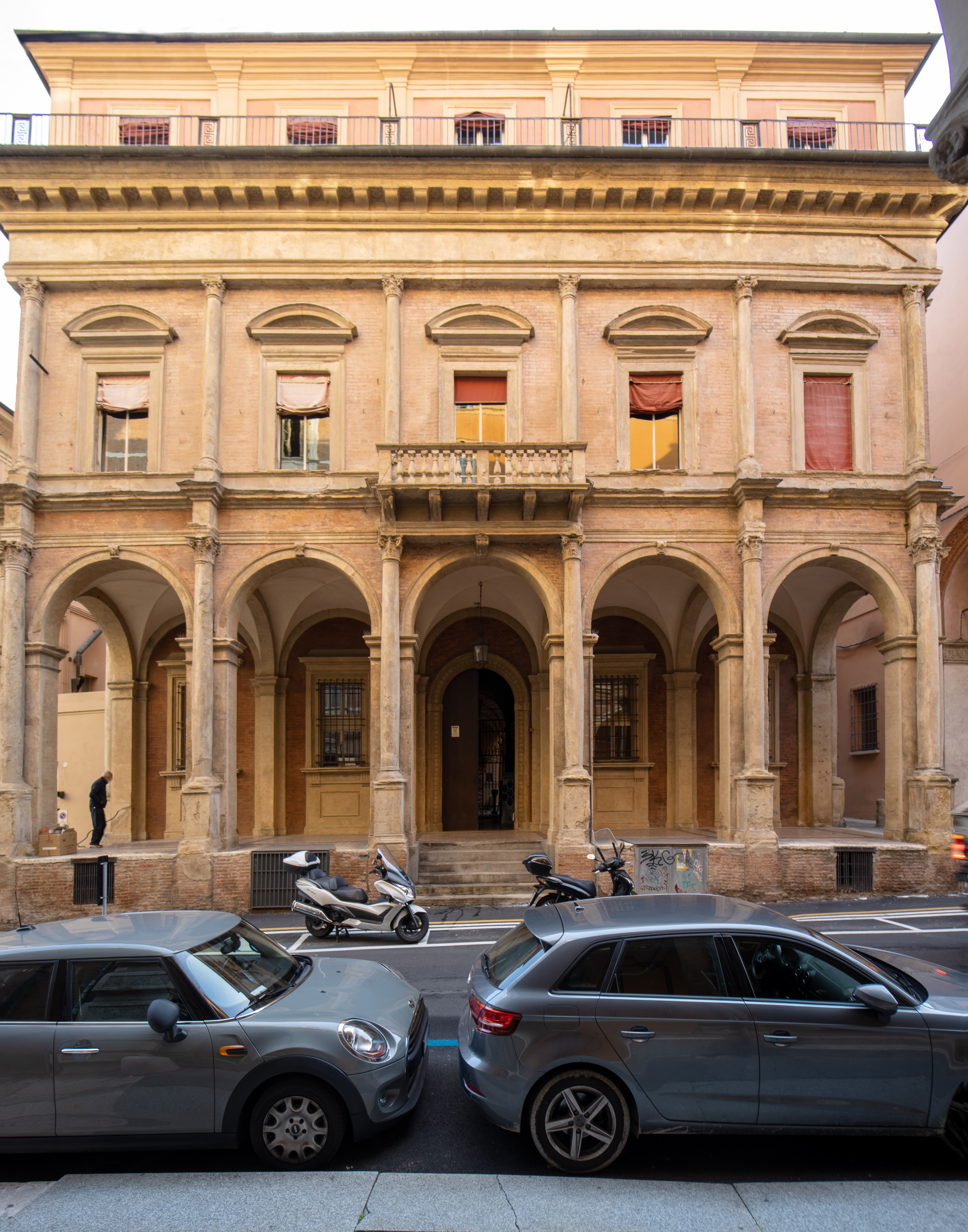
The Palazzo Dal Monte

The Palazzo Dal Monte, also known as the Palazzo Dal Monte Gaudenzi, is a Renaissance-style palace located on via Galliera #3 in Bologna, region of Emilia-Romagna, Italy. In 2015, the palace served as the home of the Centro Interdipartimentale di Ricerca in Storia del Diritto, Filosofia e Sociologia del Diritto e Informatica Giuridica (CIRSFID) of the University of Bologna.

== History ==
The palace was designed in 1529 by Andrea Marchesi da Formigine, perhaps with the help of Baldassare Peruzzi. The interiors were refurbished between 1782 and 1787 by Giovanni Storni, under commission by its then owner, Stefano Monari. The staircase was frescoed with the Rape of Deianira (1783–84) by Gaetano Gandolfi; other fresco decorations are by Serafino Barozzi. The palace was donated by professor Augusto Gaudenzi to the university.
