= Santo Stefano, Bologna =

Basilica in Bologna, Italy

Coordinates: 44.49216°N 11.348847°E

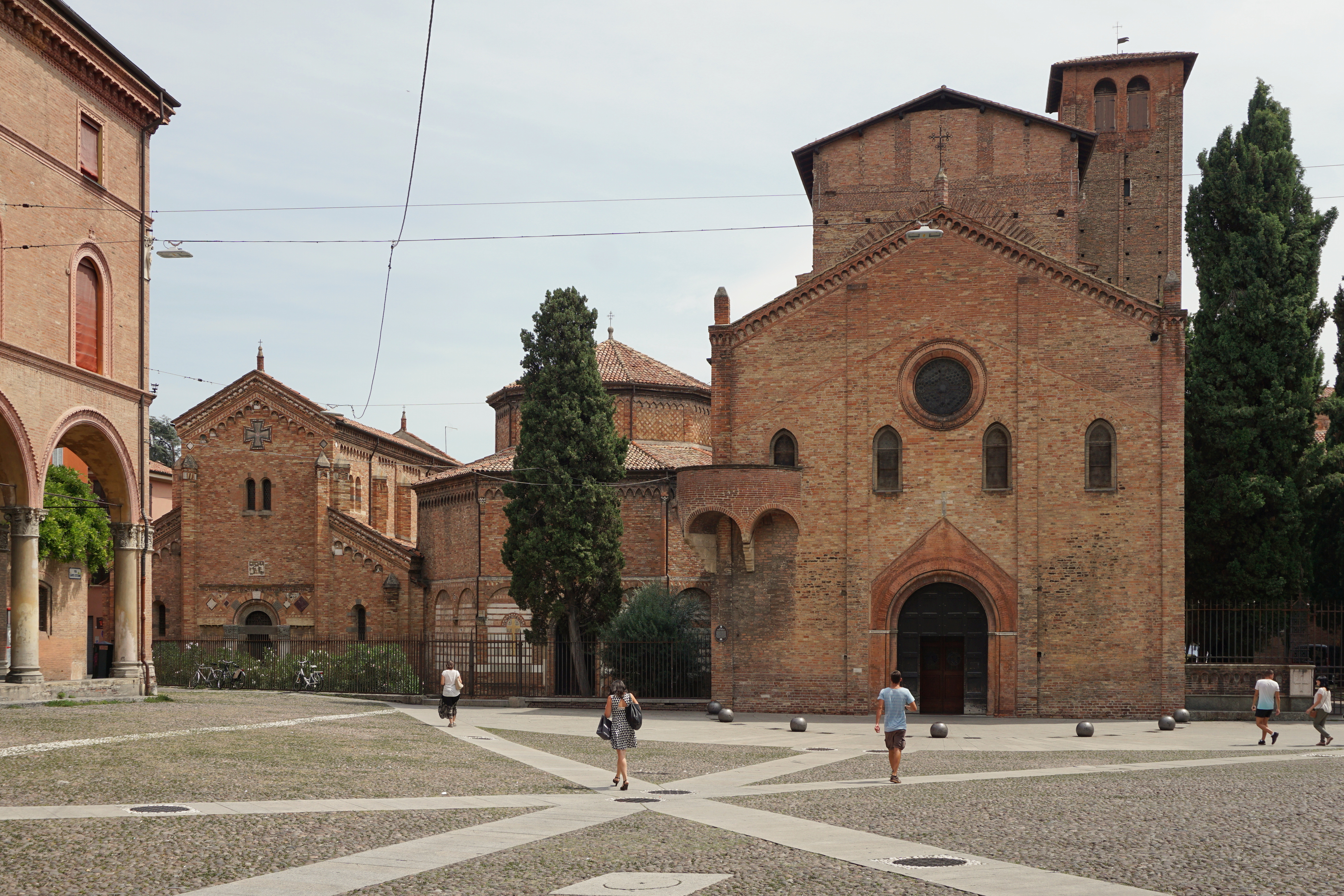
Santo Stefano, Bologna

The Basilica of Santo Stefano (Italian: Basilica di Santo Stefano) encompasses a complex of religious edifices in the city of Bologna, Italy. Located on Piazza Santo Stefano, it is locally known as Sette Chiese ("Seven Churches") and Santa Gerusalemme ("Holy Jerusalem"). It has the dignity of minor basilica.

== History ==
Layout of the Basilica 1-3. Church of the Crucifix: 2. Crypt; 4. Church of the Holy Sepulchre; 5. Church of Saints Vitale and Agricola; 6. Pilate's courtyard; 7. Church of the Trinity or the Martyrium, also called "Santa Croce", containing the ancient Nativity; 8. Cloister; 9-10-11-12. Chapel of the Bandage ("Cappella della Benda") and museum

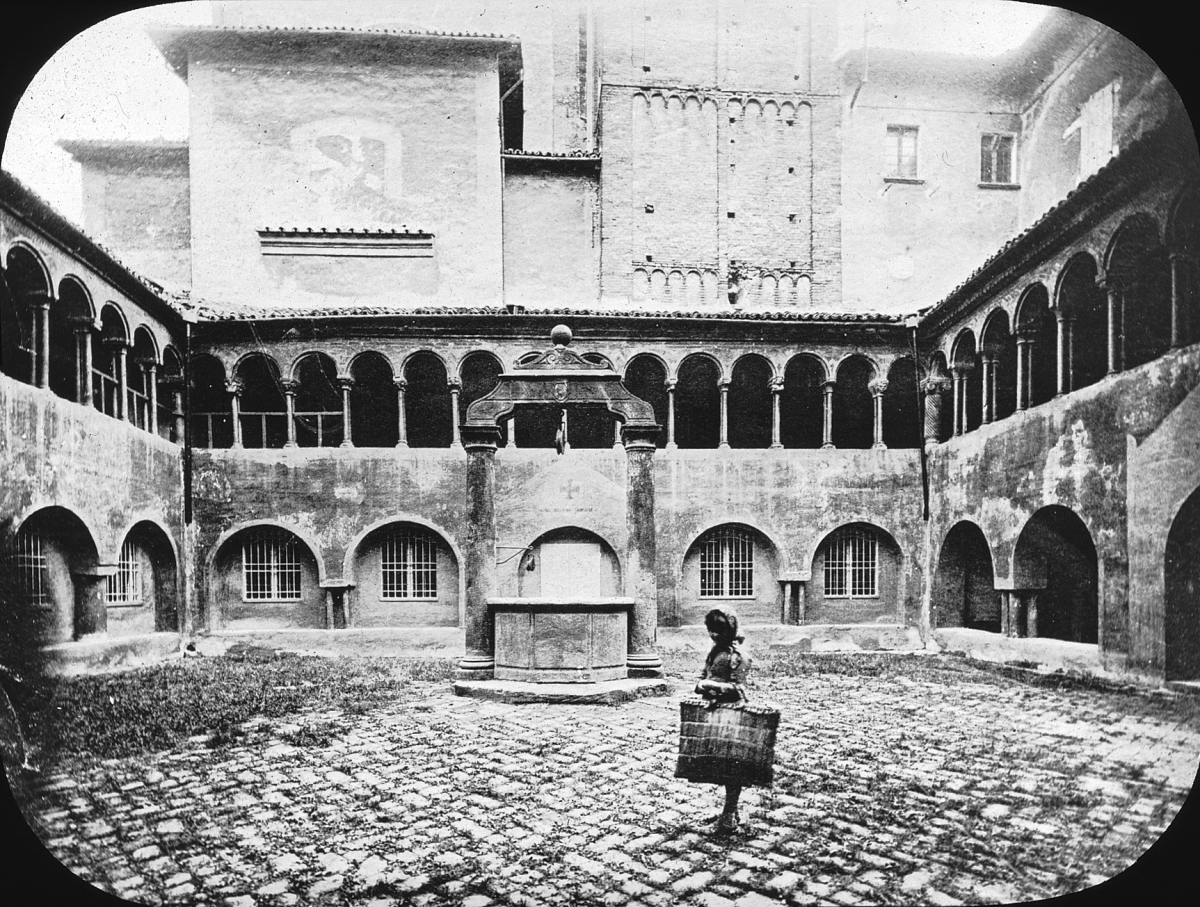
Cloister, Basilica di Santo Stefano, Bologna, Italy, 1895.

According to tradition, Saint Petronius, a bishop of the city during the 5th century, built the basilica over a temple of the goddess Isis. The saint wished to have a building that recalled the Church of the Holy Sepulchre in Jerusalem.

The different parts of the complex include:

- Church of Saint Stephen or of the Holy Crucifix (8th century; presbytery reshaped in the 17th century), with the Crypt
- Church of the Holy Sepulchre (according to tradition: 5th century)
- Church of the Saints Vitale and Agricola (4th century; rebuilt first in the 12th century)
- Courtyard of Pilate ("Santo Giardino", 13th century)
- Church of the Trinity or of the Martyrium (13th century)
- Chapel of the Bandage ("Cappella della Benda") dedicated to the strip of cloth worn around the head by the Virgin Mary as a sign of mourning.

== Church of Saint Stephen or of the Holy Crucifix ==
The church of the Crucifix is of Lombard origin and dates back to the 8th century: it consists of a single nave with a trussed vault and a raised presbytery on the crypt. In the nave, on the left, there is the 18th century statuary complex of the Compianto sul Cristo morto by Angelo Gabriello Piò [3]. At the center of the presbytery, remodeled in the seventeenth century, which is accessed via a staircase, is the Crucifix, the work of Simone dei Crocifissi dating back to about 1380. On the walls there are 15th century frescoes with the Martyrdom of Saint Stephen.

Under the presbytery there is the crypt divided into five naves with columns of different invoice, one of which, according to legend, from the base to the capital is perfectly equivalent to Jesus (about one meter and seventy, very high for the time); at the end of it, in two urns placed on an altar, the remains of the Saints Vitale and Agricola are kept. On the sides of the altar, a few years ago, two 16th-century frescoes were found under a layer of plaster, illustrating the martyrdom of Vitale and Agricola. In the left aisle, at the back near the altar, there is a small fresco of the early fifteenth century, the so-called Madonna della Neve, perhaps of Lippo di Dalmasio. An object of lesser artistic value but of some suggestion is the white statue of the Madonna Bambina, at the beginning of the crypt, on the right wall.

== Church of the Holy Sepulchre ==
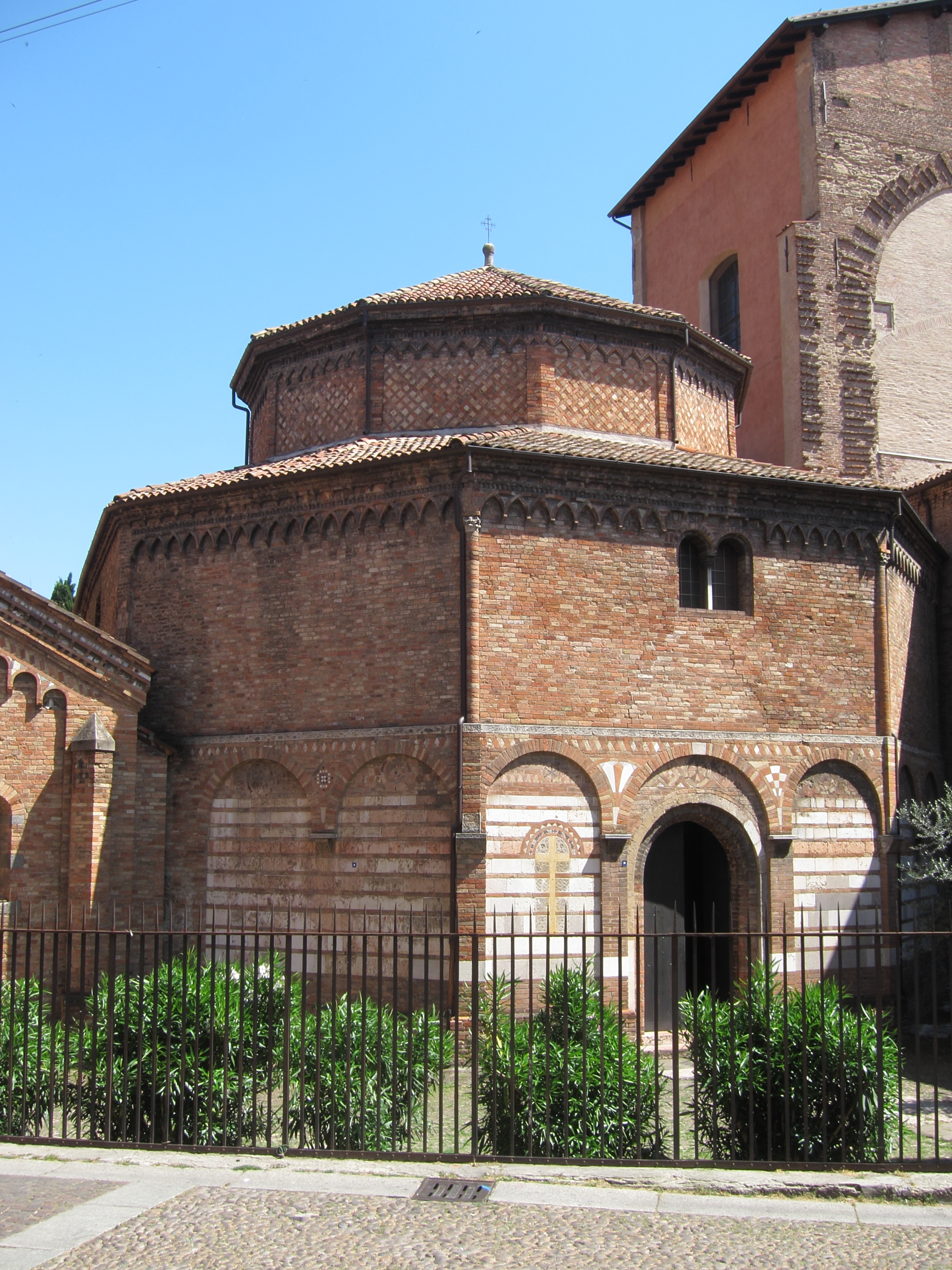
Basilica del Santo Sepolcro seen from the Piazza

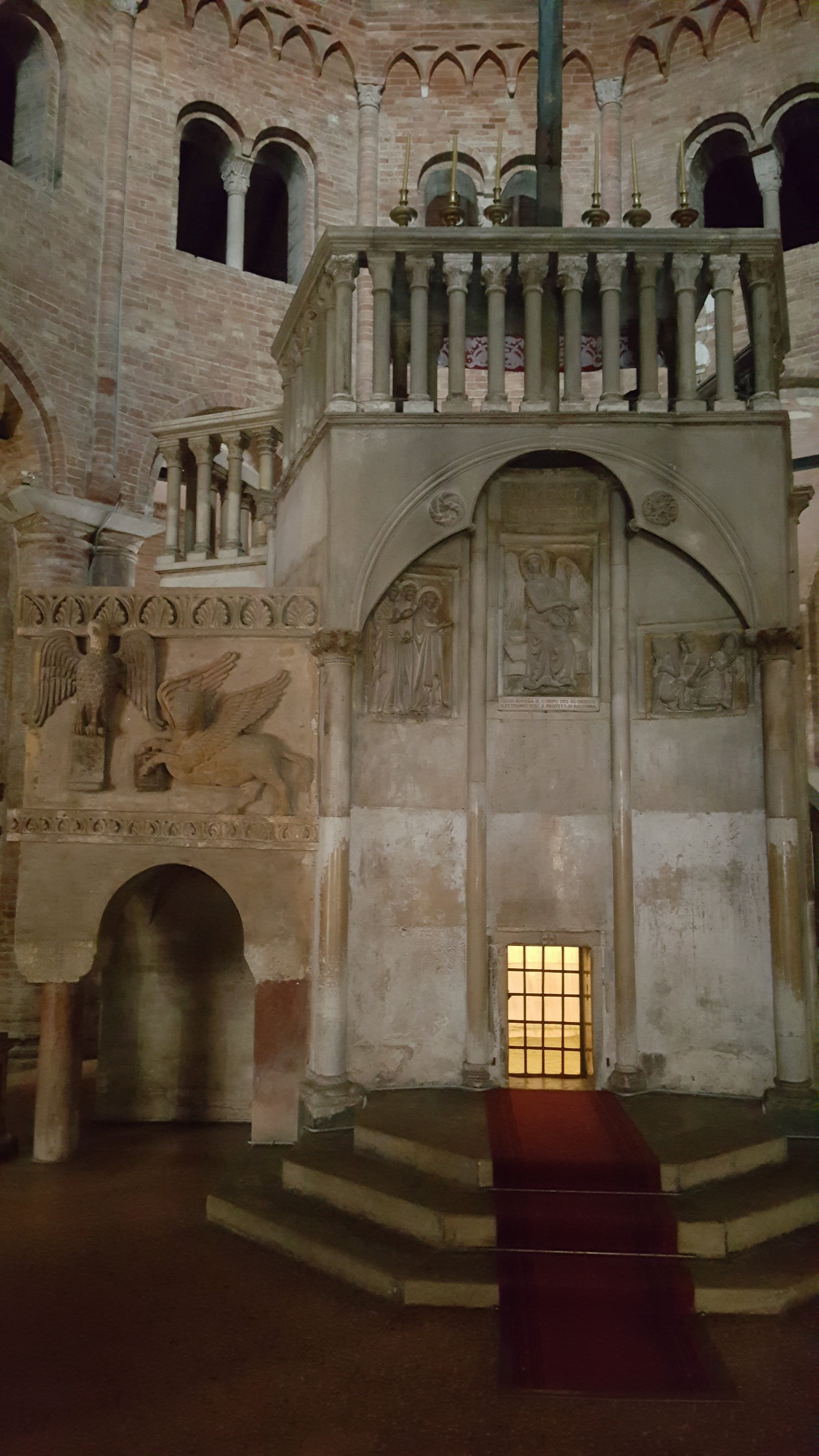
The old pulpit, within the Basilica

The church dates back to the fifth century, built by the bishop Petronius as a simulacrum of the Constantinian Sepulcher of Jerusalem and rebuilt at the beginning of the eleventh century by Benedictine monks after it was heavily damaged during the devastating 10th century Hungarian invasions. The building, with a central plan, is built on a perimeter with an irregular octagonal base in the center of which a dodecagonal dome is erected. Inside there are 12 columns of marble and brick, while in the center there is a shrine that housed the relics of San Petronio, found here in 1141. The door of the Sepulcher is opened one week a year, after the celebration of mass midnight Easter, in the presence of the Knights of the Holy Sepulcher.

In ancient times it was possible to crawl inside to venerate the remains of the saint; the prostitutes of Bologna, on Easter morning, moreover, in memory of Mary Magdalene, went there to pronounce, before the Holy Sepulcher, a prayer whose content they themselves never wanted to reveal. Still according to another ancient tradition, pregnant women in Bologna used to walk thirty-three times (one for each year of the Savior's life) around the Sepulcher, entering each lap in the tomb to pray; at the end of the thirty-third lap, the women then went to the nearby church of the Martyrium to pray before the fresco of the pregnant Madonna. Today the body of St. Petronius is no longer in this church, after which in the year 2000 Cardinal Giacomo Biffi had it moved to the Basilica of San Petronio, which already guarded the head of the patron saint of the city.

In the church there is also a water source which, in the symbolism of the Stefan complex based on the passion of Christ, is identified with the waters of the Jordan, and which from the archaeological point of view refers to the sacred source of the pre-existing isiac complex. Probably the temple of Isis was in this area, as it seems demonstrated, as well as by the presence of the source (the cult of the Egyptian goddess required the presence of a source of spring water), the persistence of seven Greek marble columns, coming from the city of Karystos (according to surveys made by the University of Geology of Padua), certainly from the Roman period; they have been reused, as you can clearly see, since the seven Roman columns, still standing, were flanked in the Middle Ages by as many brick columns, while where Roman columns were missing, destroyed by the Hungarians raids, new columns were built more robust.

A column of black Cipollino marble, of African origin and of the Roman era (also certainly reused from a previous building), offset from the others, symbolizes the column where Christ was scourged and, as stated in a scroll, guaranteed 200 years of indulgence to each and every time you visit this place.

The vault and the walls of the church originally had frescoes with biblical scenes created by Marco Berlinghieri in the mid-thirteenth century, almost entirely eliminated in 1804 to be replaced by new frescoes in Baroque style made by Filippo Pedrini, in turn eliminated by subsequent restorations of the late nineteenth century; what remains of the original thirteenth-century frescoes (a scene representing the Strage of the Innocents) is visible in the basilica museum.

== Church of the Saints Vitale and Agricola ==
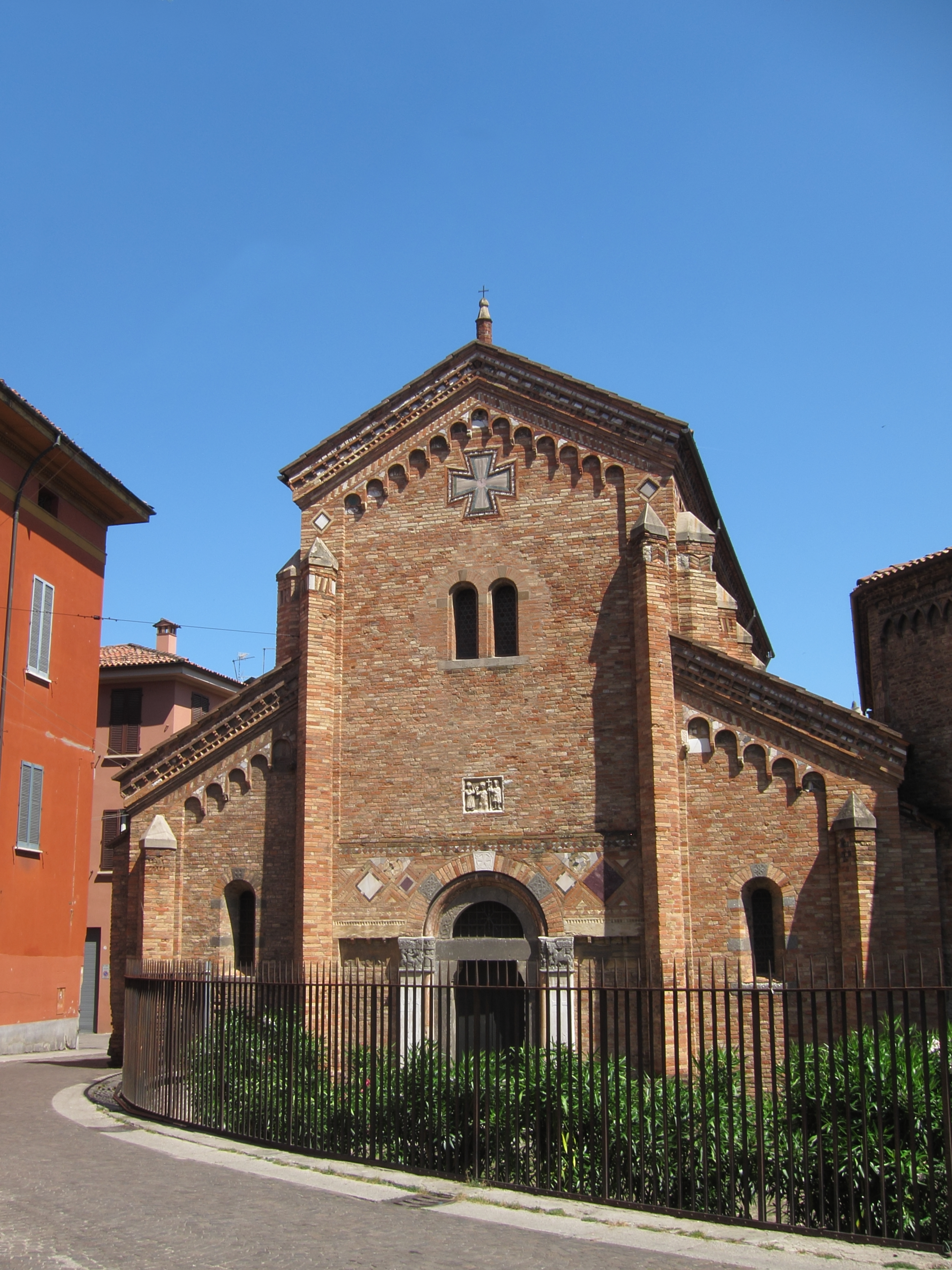
SS. Vitale e Agricola seen from the Piazza

This basilica-shaped church is the oldest part of the complex. With a salient façade and triconca apse, but without a transept, it is dedicated to the patron saints Vitale and Agricola. Since its construction it housed the relics of the two saints, respectively servant and master, the first two martyrs from Bologna, dating back to Diocletian (305 AD). In 393 the remains were moved from Ambrogio to be taken to Milan (a fact that testifies that the basilica was already built) and also in the fifth century a messenger was sent by Namazio, bishop of Clermont, to get relics of the Bolognese protomartyrs.

At the beginning of the 15th century a paleochristian sepulcher with the inscription "Symon" had been found and the rumor had spread that it was the tomb of Simon Peter, that is of Saint Peter. This news, devoid of any historical foundation, had attracted many pilgrims, distracting them from Rome, the classic destination of pilgrimage. The pope, Pope Eugene IV, then reacted vehemently: he made the church open, he had it filled with earth and left it in this state for about seventy years. Subsequently, through the intercession of the archbishop Giuliano Della Rovere, the church was restored and reopened for worship. An inscription on the side door recalls the event: "JUL. CARD. S. P. AD VINC. RESTITUIT". Inside the church there are some interesting finds: remains of Roman mosaic floor, visible through a glass. Then, in the two side apses, two early medieval sarcophagi attributed to Vitale and Agricola, with figures of animals (lions, deer and peacocks) in a raised relief. In the right aisle, on the wall, a cross is identified as that of the torture of St. Agila (in reality it dates back to a later period). The main altar, made up of a turned pagan altar, is set against the back wall (according to the pre-conciliar liturgy, when the celebrant gave his back to the faithful during the celebrations).

== Courtyard of Pilate ==
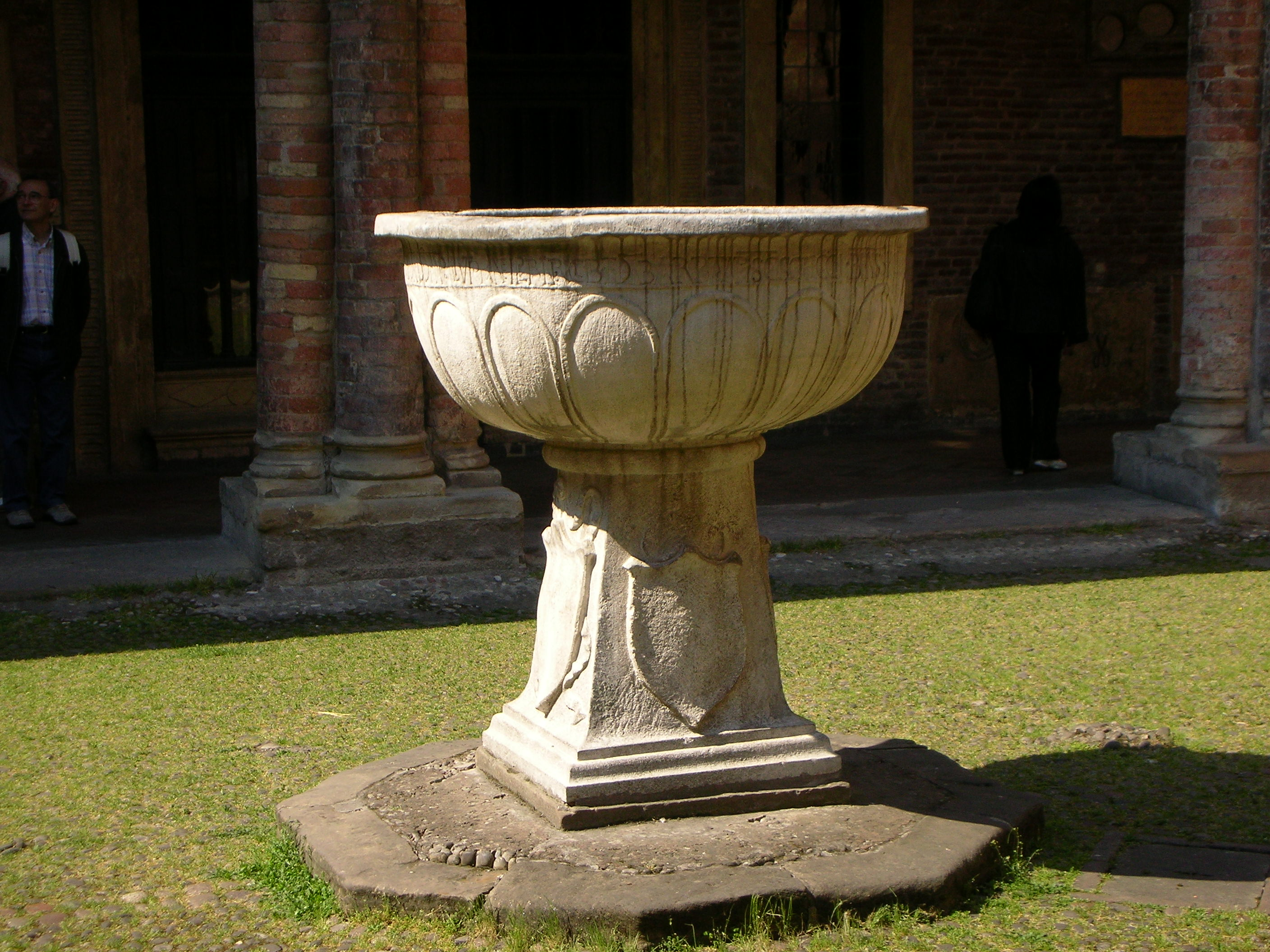
Il Catino di Pilato (8th ct., on a 16th ct. pedestal)

At the Cortile di Pilato, so called to commemorate the lithostrotos, the place where Jesus was condemned, is accessed by exiting the church of the Sepulcher. The courtyard is bordered to the north and south by two porticoes in Romanesque style with characteristic cruciform columns in brick and brings to the center a limestone basin resting on a 16th-century pedestal. The so-called Catino di Pilato ("Pilato's bowl") is a Longobard work dating back to 737–744 and bears an inscription under the edge of which is reported the most accredited transcription:

UMILIB(US) VOTA SUSCIPE D(OMI)NE D(OM)N(ORUM) N(OST)R(ORUM) LIUTPRAN(TE) ILPRAN(TE) REGIB(US) ET D(OMI)N(O) BARBATU EPISC(OPO) S(AN)C(TE) HECCL(ESIE) B(O)N(ONIEN)S(I)S. HIC I(N) H(ONOREM) R(ELIGIOSI) SUA PRAECEPTA OBTULERUNT, UNDE HUNC VAS IMPLEATUR IN CENAM D(OMI)NI SALVAT(ORI)S, ET SI QUA MUN(ER)A C(UISQUAM) MINUERIT, D(EU)S REQ(UIRET)

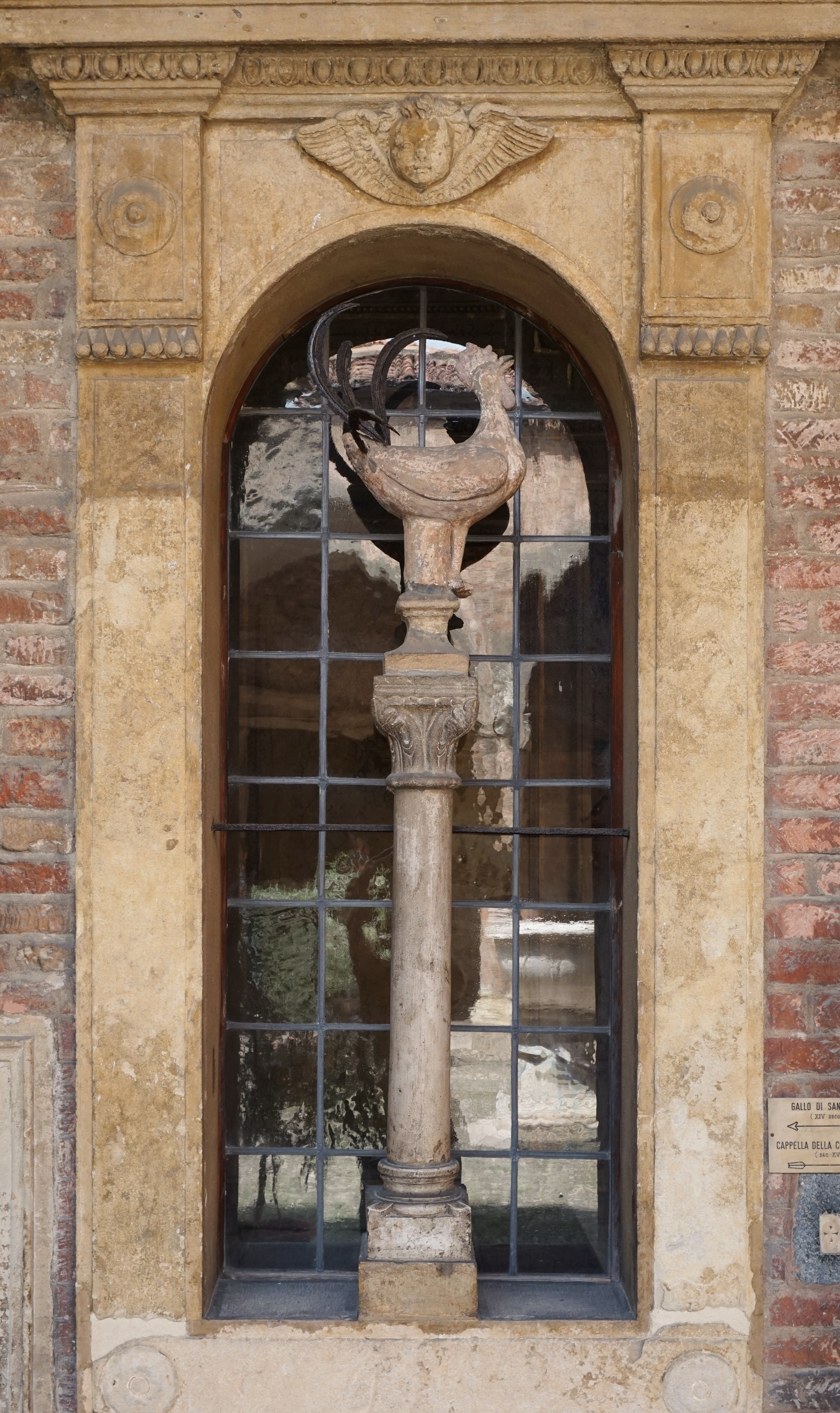
Gallo di S. Pietro (14th ct)

Under the portico, in the center of a window, on a column, there is a stone rooster dating back to the fourteenth century, called "Gallo di S. Pietro" to remember the evangelical episode of the denial of Jesus. Also under the portico are some mortuary tombstones including one, with a pair of real scissors in the center, belonging to a tailor. Significant for the symbolism of the passion of Christ is that the distance between this courtyard and the nearby church of San Giovanni in Monte (so called because it stands on the only natural protuberance of the central dish of Bologna) would be the same that there is in Jerusalem between the Holy Sepulcher and Calvary.

== Church of the Trinity ==
The Church of the Trinity is also called Church of the Martyrium (or the Calvary). Originally it had to be built in the form of a basilica with five naves, with an apse in front of the holy garden (Pilato's courtyard) and the façade to the east, exactly as the Holy Sepulcher in Jerusalem was originally. Probably due to lack of funds, Petronius could not complete the building that remained unfinished. Later, with the advent of the Lombards, it would become a Baptistery. At the beginning of the 10th century, during the reconstructions made by the Benedictines, there were several uncertainties about how to finish the work, considering that the original Holy Sepulcher had been heavily altered and in those years the Fatimid Caliph al-Hakim was working on its destruction. So having lost the historical references of what it was originally, the Benedictines could not complete it. With the late nineteenth-century renovations it was rebuilt in neo-Romanesque style on the model of the Holy Sepulcher built by the Crusaders. From the time of the Crusades and until 1950, a relic of the Holy Cross was kept in the central chapel.

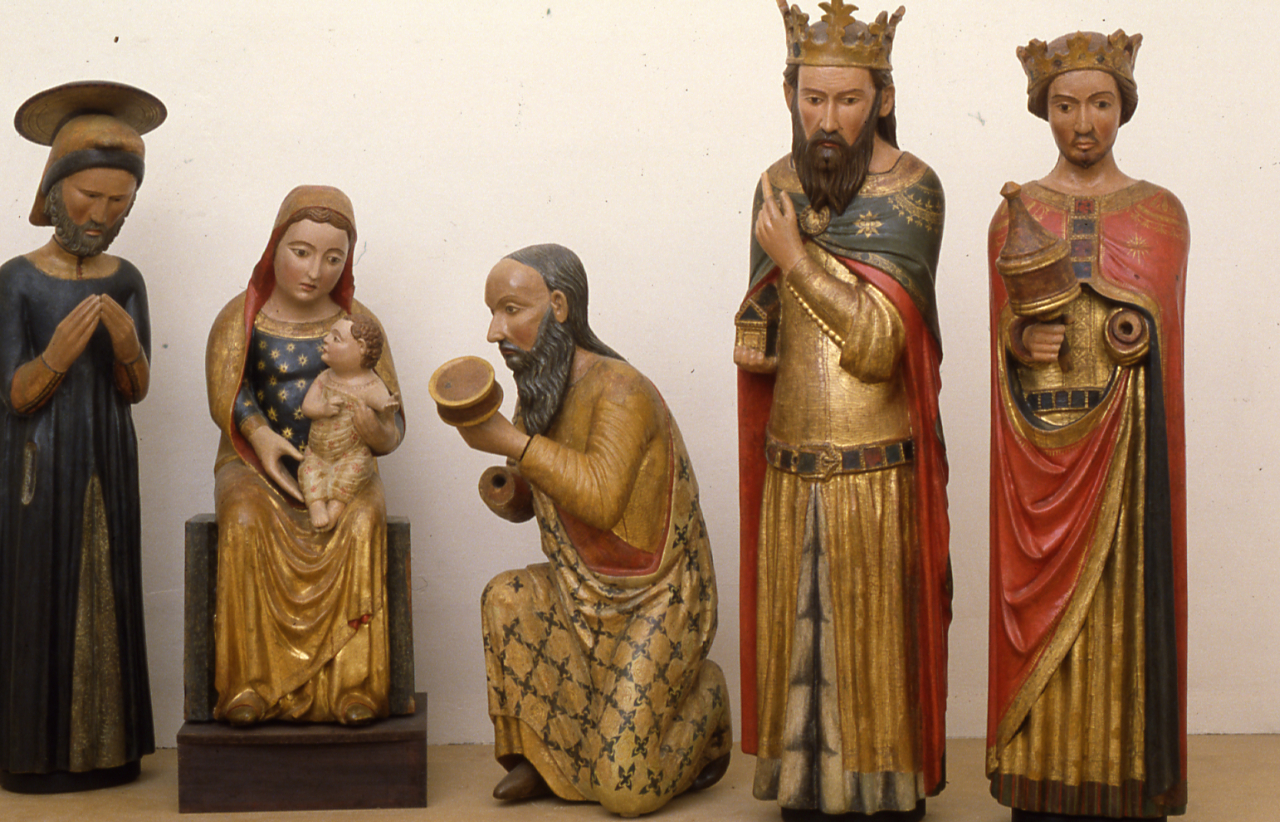
Adoration of the Magi (ca. 1290/1370), full-scale sculptures after restoration in 1980. Photo by Paolo Monti taken for the publication by Ferretti.

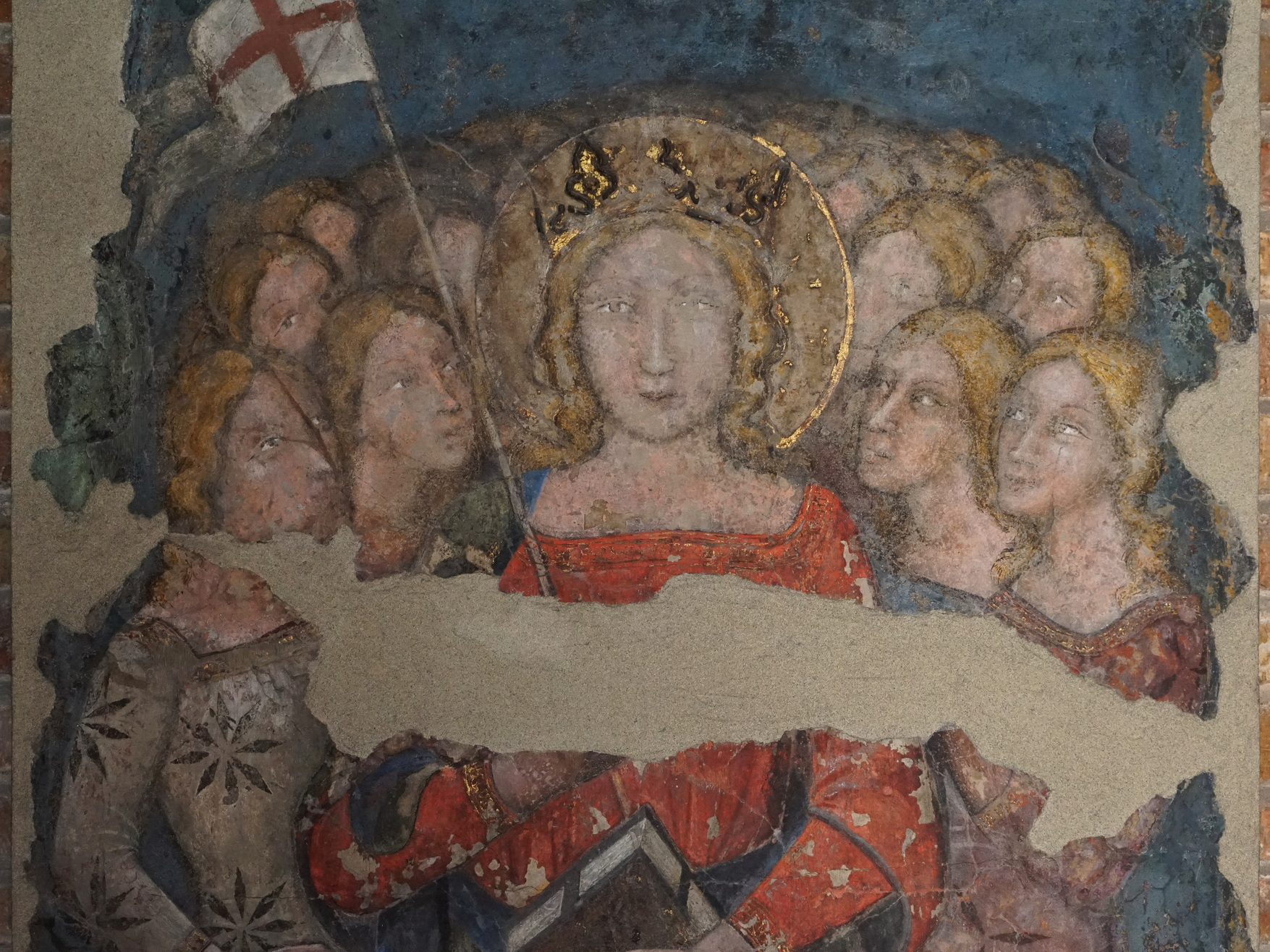
Fresco of St. Ursula and companions (14th ct.)

Of great interest, in the last little chapel, entering on the right, there is permanently placed the large wooden group of the Adoration of the Magi, with man-sized statues. It is the oldest known crib in the world made up of statues in the round. A detailed study of the work published in 1981 by Massimo Ferretti, at the end of the first major restoration carried out by Marisa and Otello Caprara, has identified the sculptor of the statues as the Master of the Crucifix 1291 kept in the Art Collections of the City of Bologna. The work was first sculpted by trunks of lime and elm, perhaps in the last decade of the thirteenth century. The work remained colorless until 1370, when it was commissioned by the Bolognese painter Simone dei Crocifissi who took care of the rich polychrome and gilding with his very personal Gothic style. The 1981 restoration brought out the splendid polychrome, which had darkened over the centuries. But with the subsequent passing of years the humidity of the Church, in which the work was exhibited throughout the year, had begun to ruin the polychrome again. For this reason, the statues were restored again from 2000 until 2004, when all the work was exhibited in the Pinacoteca di Bologna, where it remained until Christmas 2006, when it was reported to Santo Stefano. Finally, on 21 January 2007 the complete work was inaugurated inside a large electronically controlled humidity and temperature case, equipped with shatterproof glass, which now houses the entire group permanently.

In this church there are also pieces of frescoes from the 14th century, in particular a fragment showing Sant'Orsola with her companions of martyrdom and a pregnant Madonna who, besides being of exquisite workmanship, touches the loving gesture with which she caresses her bursting belly; the other hand of the Virgin holds a book.

The last little chapel on the right has been dedicated, in recent times, to the Bersaglieri, but is devoid of artistic content.

== Scholarly interest ==
The focus of scholarly discussion has been for many years the supposed similarity between the so-called "New Jerusalem" rebuilt here, according to a vita written in 1180, by Saint Petronius in the 5th century, and the largely lost 4th-century complex erected by Constantine the Great at the purported site of the crucifixion and resurrection of Jesus. Unfortunately the archaeological evidence from Bologna dates primarily to the 11th and 12th centuries, leaving the question about an earlier date still unanswered (at least until 1981). On the other hand, archaeology has meanwhile delivered many answers regarding the Constantinian church complex from Jerusalem, therefore the main interest presented by the 12th-century parts of the Church of Santo Stefano might much rather be their similarity to the almost contemporary Crusader Church of the Holy Sepulchre from Jerusalem, of which not all parts are preserved.

== See also ==
- High medieval domes
