= Piazza Santo Stefano =

Square in Bologna, Italy

Coordinates: 44.492237°N 11.348217°E

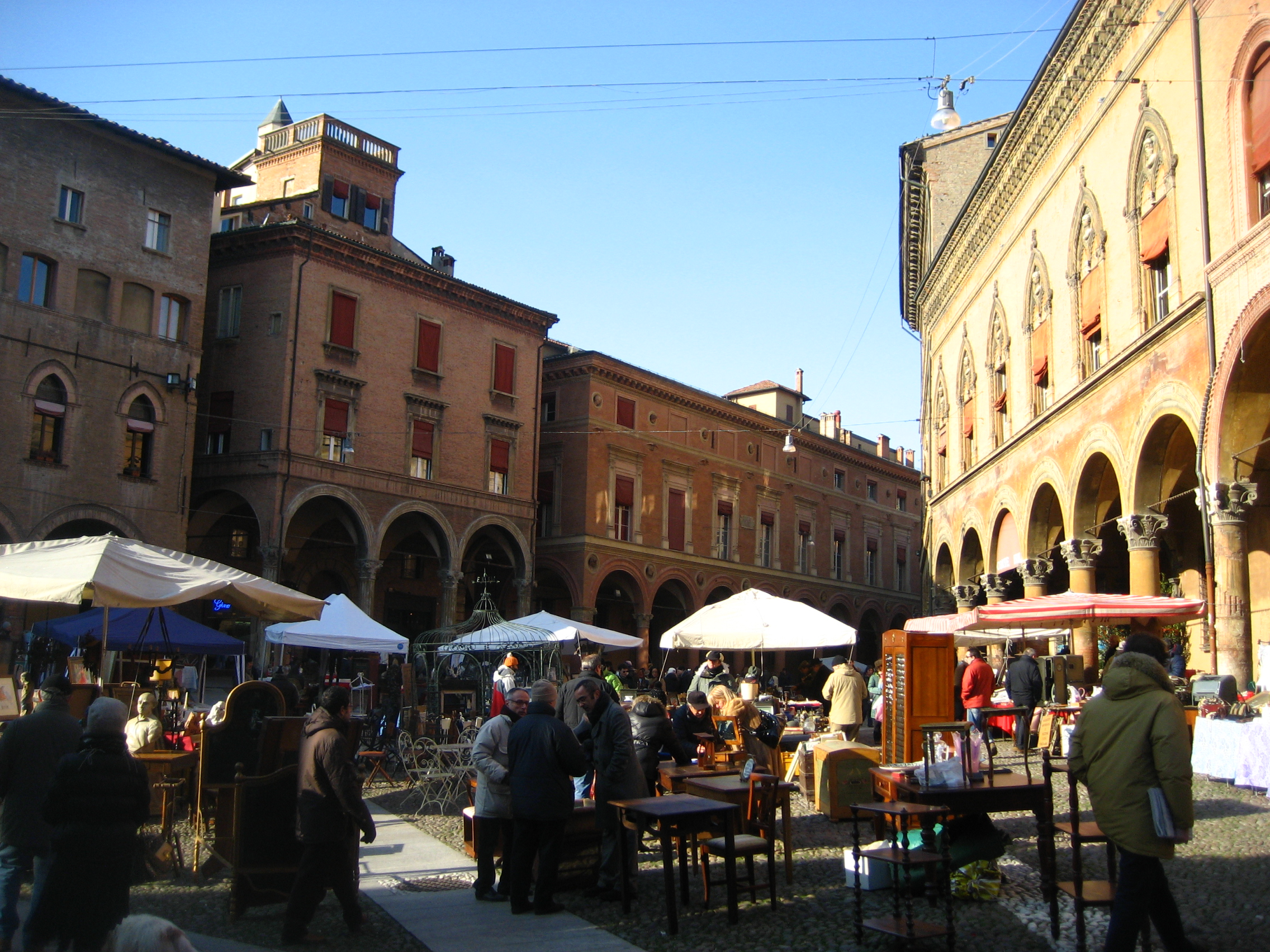
markets and porticos of Piazza Santo Stefano

Piazza Santo Stefano also known as Piazza delle Sette Chiese (Seven churches square) is a piazza of Bologna, Italy. It is a pedestrian zone, in a triangular space near the beginning of Via Santo Stefano, both of which are named after the Basilica of Santo Stefano which is located on the piazza.

Often used for cultural events, flea-markets and concerts, it has porticos along both long sides (North-East and South-West) with the Basilica occupying the short (South-East) side. To the left of the Basilica is a complex of buildings joined by the powerful medieval Isolani family. From the left side you can reach Strada Maggiore (formerly the Via Aemilia) via the Corte Isolani passage which was created in renovations to the Palazzo Isolani in 1999. On the right is Palazzo Bolognini Amorini Salina, notable for its frieze with terracotta heads, and the "Case Tacconi", a good example of Bolognese merchant houses of the fifteenth century.

Piazza Santo Stefano

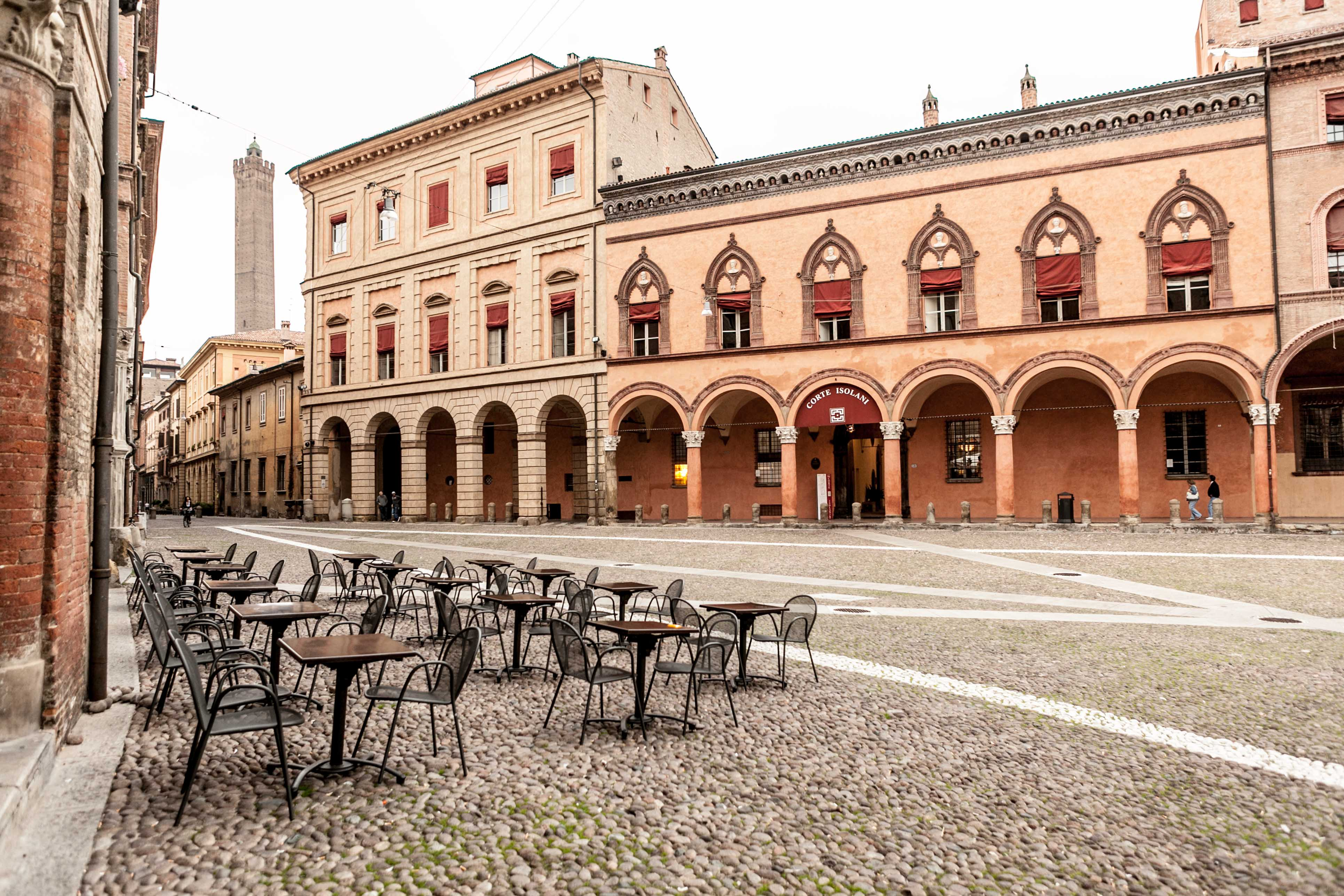
North-East side

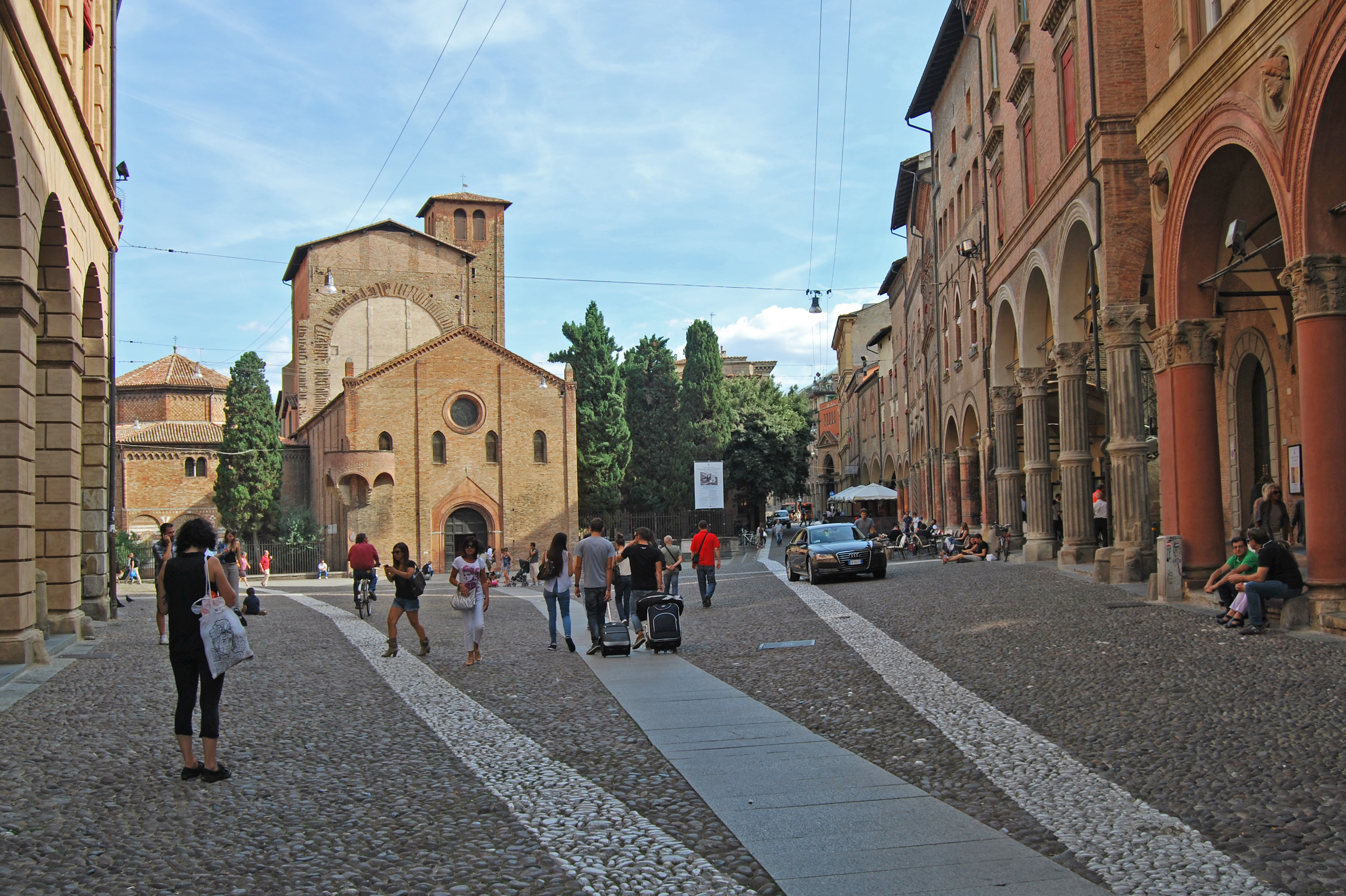
South-East side

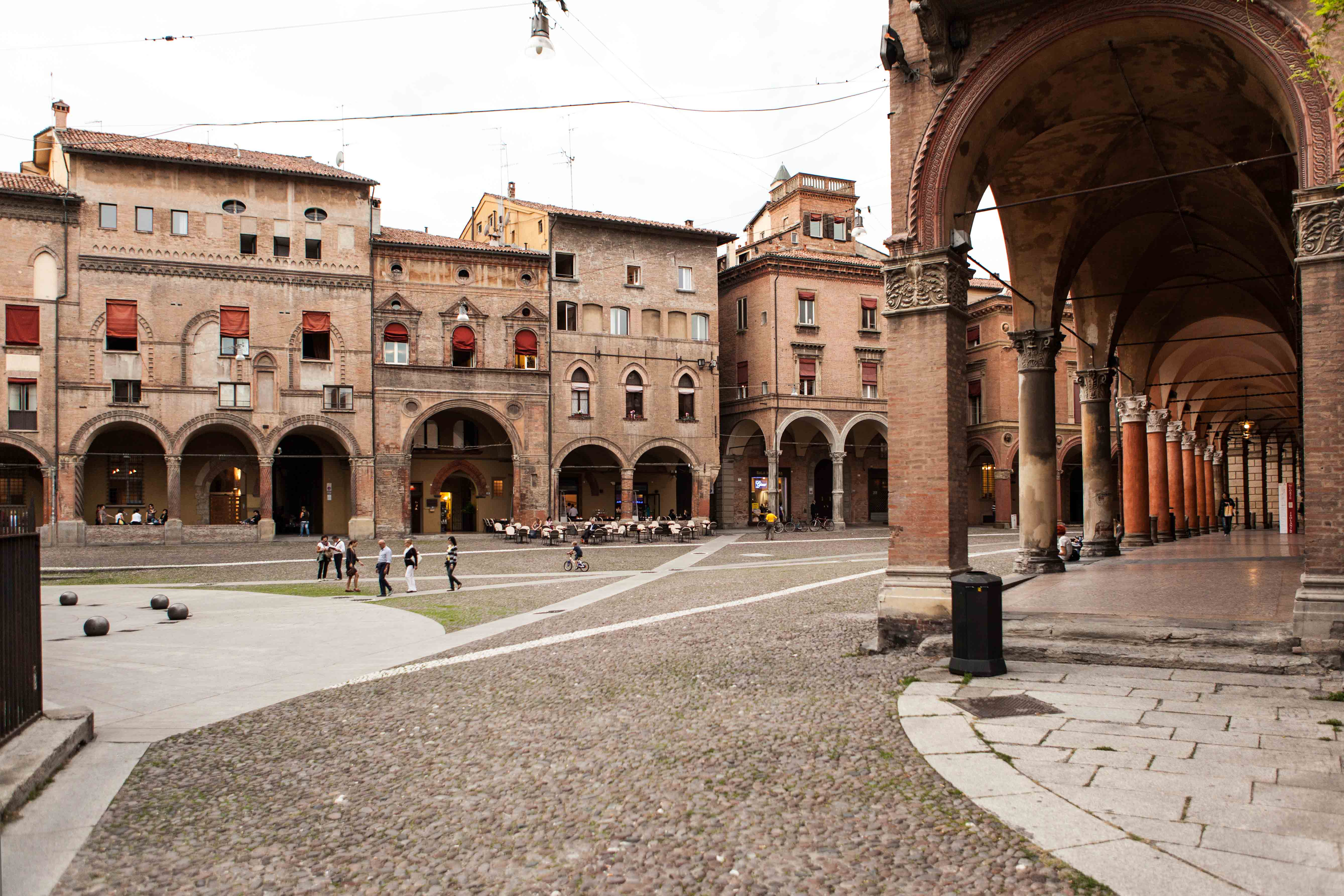
South-West side
