= Palazzo Bolognini Amorini Salina =

Coordinates: 44°29′33.01″N 11°20′52.01″E

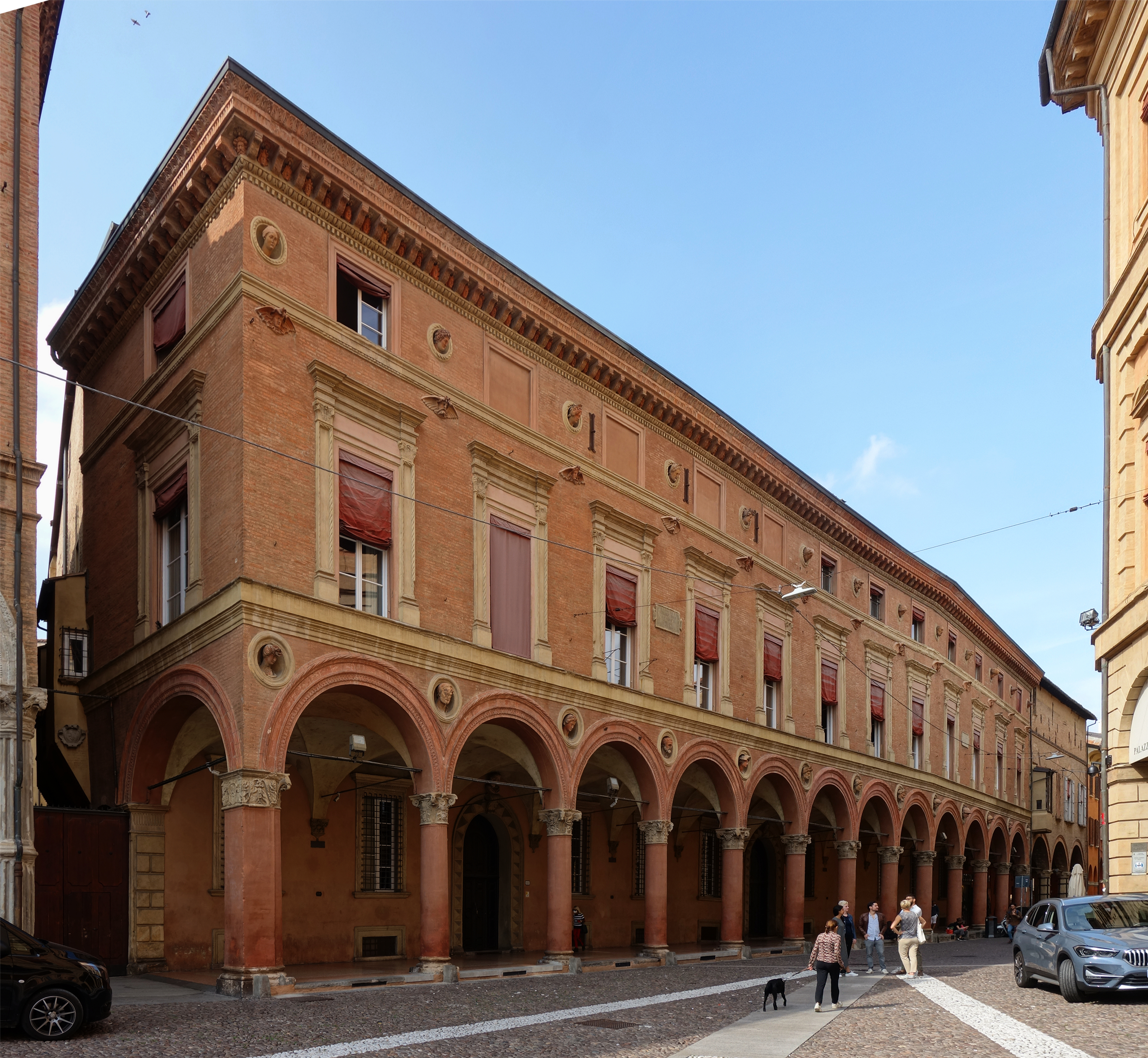
Palazzo Bolognini Amorini Salina

The Palazzo Bolognini Amorini Salina is a Renaissance architecture palace located on Piazza Santo Stefano (Via Santo Stefano 9–11) in the center of Bologna, region of Emilia-Romagna, Italy. The Palace is notable by its circular niches with busts on the facade. The palace is still owned by descendant of the 16th-century Senatorial family.

== History ==
The building was erected between 1517 and 1525 with work continuing from 1551 to 1602. The design was by Andrea da Formigine; Formigine and Properzia de' Rossi sculpted the capitols in the portico. Palace construction ceased by 1602 for lack of funds, and work on the palace was not restarted till the 19th-century, and not completed until the 1884 under the engineer Lamberdini.

The facade has a series of capricci busts made of terra-cotta in the spandrels and below the roofline. The Renaissance artists were Alfonso Lombardi and Nicolò da Volterra and the 19th-century contribution on the right of the facade were by Giulio Cesare Conventi.
