= The Birth of the Virgin =

The Birth of the Virgin refers to the nativity of Mary. It is also the title of some paintings:

- The Birth of the Virgin (Annibale Carracci), a 1605–1609 oil-on-canvas painting by Annibale Carracci
- The Birth of the Virgin (Murillo), 1661 painting by Bartolomé Esteban Murillo
