= Rest on the Flight into Egypt (Annibale Carracci) =

Painting by Annibale Carracci

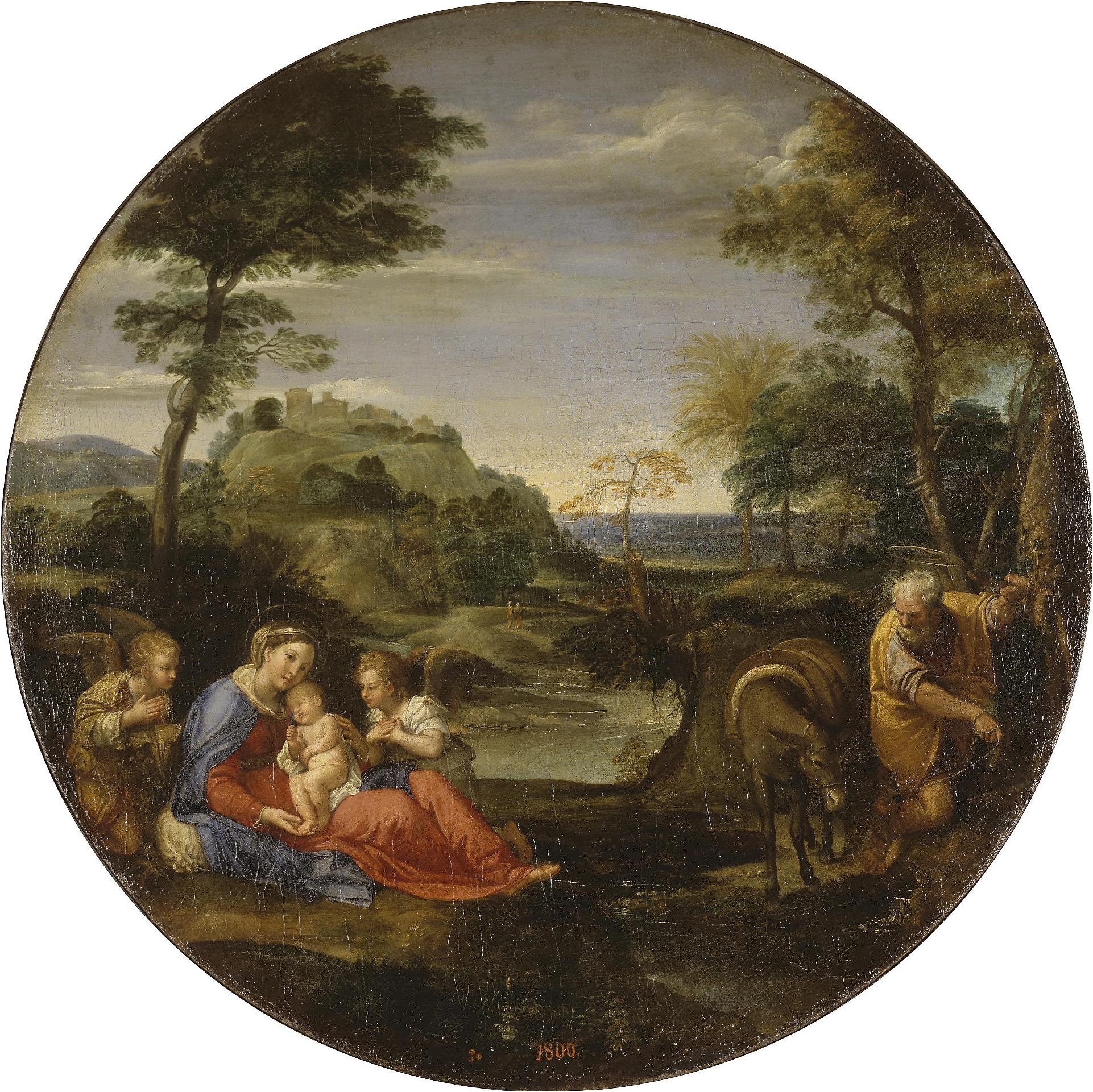
Rest on the Flight into Egypt

Rest on the Flight into Egypt is a c. 1604 oil on canvas painting by the Italian painter Annibale Carracci.

It probably originally formed part of Jaccques Stella's collection, which was brought from Italy to Paris. In 1672 it was recorded in abbot Deno de La Nu's collection and it probably also belonged to the La Mera family, whose coat of arms is superimposed over that of Francois de Poigli on the back of the work. It was acquired in 1772 by Pierre Crozat and later by Catherine the Great, thus arriving at its present home in the Hermitage Museum. It is displayed in room 231 (Italy) in the New Hermitage Palace.

== Copies ==
An anonymous 17th-century rectangular copy is recorded in the Orleans Collection before being acquired by the Duke of Sutherland and finally ending up in Princeton University Art Museum. An early round copy is now in the Kunsthalle in Berne, whilst another rectangular copy was auctioned at Christie's on 31 July 1956. Another round copy is in a private U.S. collection.

== Description ==
On the left side of the painting is depicted the sleeping Madonna with Child surrounded by two angels. Saint Joseph on the right brings the donkey to quench his thirst. The figures are set against a landscape backdrop of trees; in the distance, the perimeter of a city is visible on the hill. An X-ray of the painting shows that it originally depicted a male figure, probably an image of Christ ("Christ with Angels in the Desert"), but Carracci painted the Madonna over it. The numbers "1800" are marked in orange at the bottom center: they correspond to the number under which the painting was entered in the first manuscript catalogue of the Hermitage, begun in 1797. The image illustrates an episode from the Gospel of Matthew (2:13-23), when Mary and Joseph with the newborn Jesus flee to Egypt. In the apocryphal Gospel of Pseudo-Matthew (chap. XX) there is a description of the episode.
