= Portable Altarpiece with Pietà and Saints =

1603 painting by Annibale Carracci

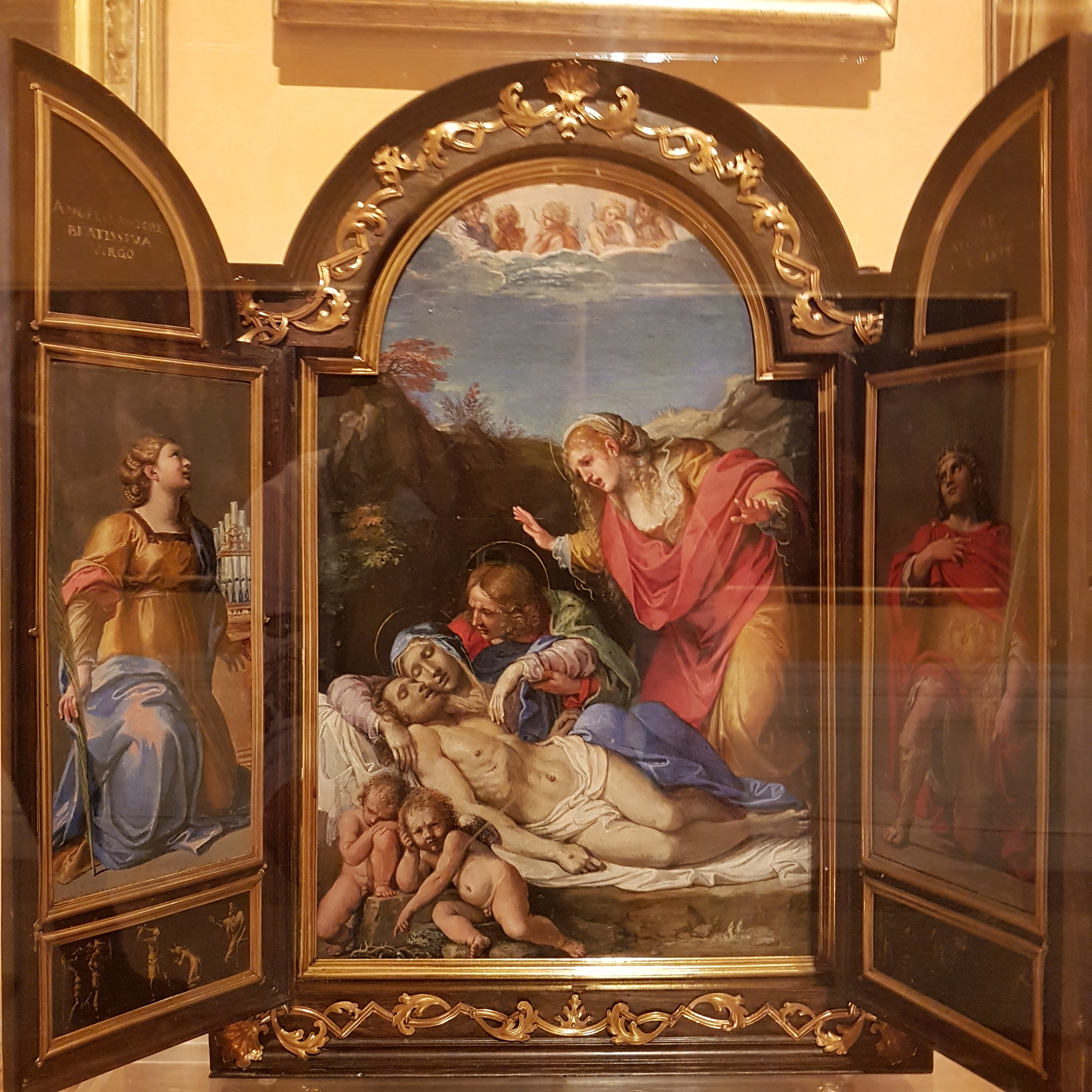
The altarpiece open

Portable Altarpiece with Pietà and Saints is an oil-on-canvas painting created in 1603 by the Italian Baroque painter Annibale Carracci. It is a triptych mounted in a gold, ebony and copper frame. It is now in the Galleria Nazionale d'Arte Antica in Rome.

A small altarpiece commissioned by cardinal Odoardo Farnese for his private devotions, its central scene shows a pieta with the dead Christ, the Virgin Mary, Saint John and Saint Mary Magdalene. The inner faces of the doors show Saint Cecilia and Saint Hermenegild above small scenes of their martyrdoms, whilst their exterior show Michael the Archangel and a guardian angel below a lunette of Christ and God the Father.
