= Self-Portrait in Profile (Annibale Carracci) =

Painting by Annibale Carracci

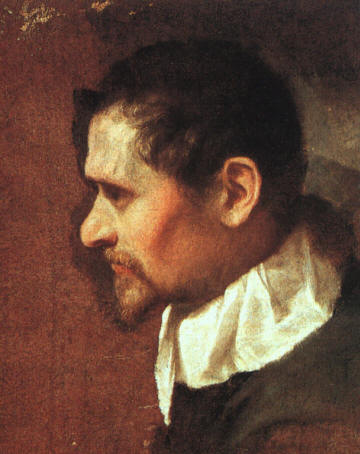
Self-Portrait in Profile by Annibale Carracci

Self-Portrait in Profile (Inventory 1890, N. 1797) is an oil painting on canvas created ca. 1590s by the italian painter Annibale Carracci. It was acquired by Leopoldo de' Medici and now part of the collection of artists' self-portraits in the Uffizi, which also includes another self-portrait. As of 1686 it hung alongside another portrait previously thought to be another Carracci self-portrait (inv. 1890, 1803)
