= The Laughing Youth =

Painting by Annibale Carracci

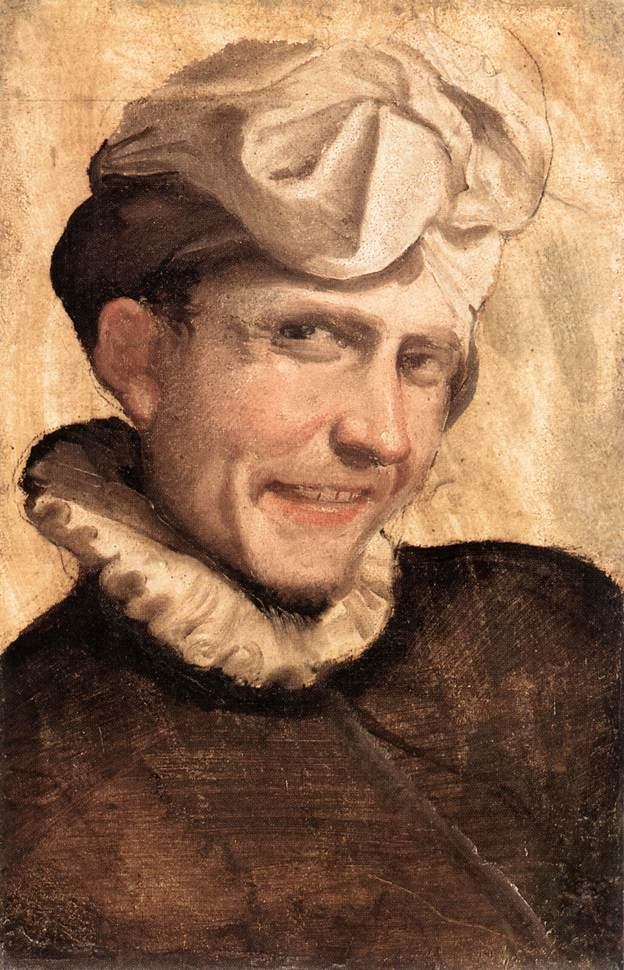
The Laughing Youth

The Laughing Youth or Head of a Laughing Youth is an oil on card painting by the Italian artist Annibale Carracci, later applied to a canvas support. Belonging to a group of 'ritrattini' or small portraits produced by the artist from 1582 onwards, it is first mentioned in the written record as ”Buffone che ride” (The Smiling Clown) in an inventory of the Borghese Collection from 1693.
