= Annibale Carracci =

Bolognese painter (1560–1609)

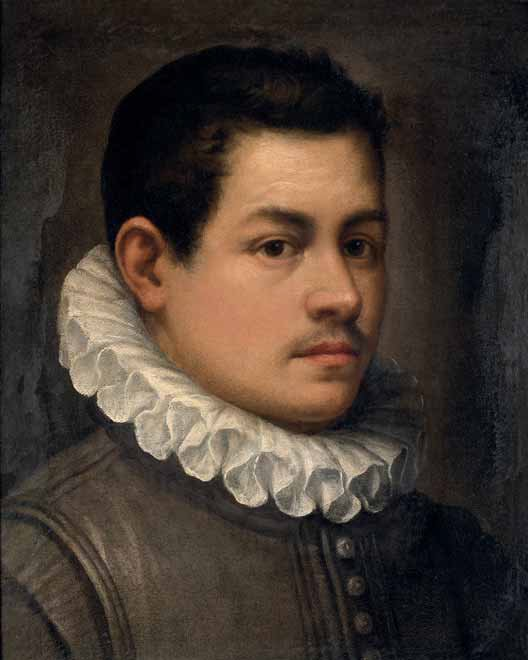
- Self-portrait, c. 1580
- Born: November 3, 1560; Bologna, Papal States
- Died: July 15, 1609 (aged 48); Rome, Papal States
- Known for: Painting
- Movement: Baroque
- Relatives: Agostino Carracci (brother); Ludovico Carracci (cousin); Antonio Carracci (nephew); Francesco Carracci (nephew)

Annibale Carracci (/kəˈrɑːtʃi/ kə-RAH-chee, UK also /kəˈrætʃi/ kə-RATCH-ee, Italian: [anˈniːbale karˈrattʃi]; November 3, 1560 – July 15, 1609) was an Italian painter and instructor, active in Bologna and later in Rome. Along with his younger brother Agostino Carracci and elder cousin Ludovico Carracci (with whom he also worked collectively), Annibale was one of the progenitors, if not founders of a leading strand of the Baroque style, borrowing from styles from both north and south of their native city, and aspiring for a return to classical monumentality, but adding a more vital dynamism. Painters working under Annibale at the gallery of the Palazzo Farnese would be highly influential in Roman painting for decades.

== Early career ==
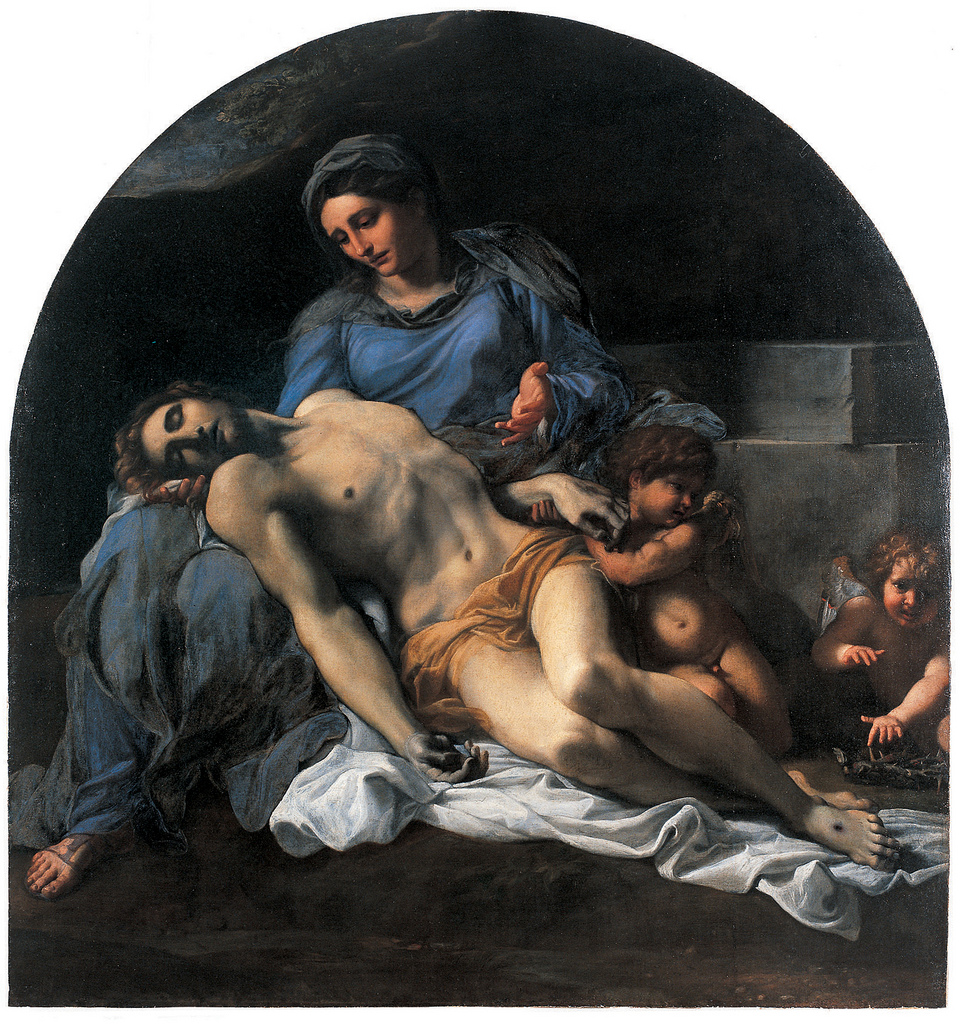
Pietà between 1599 and 1600

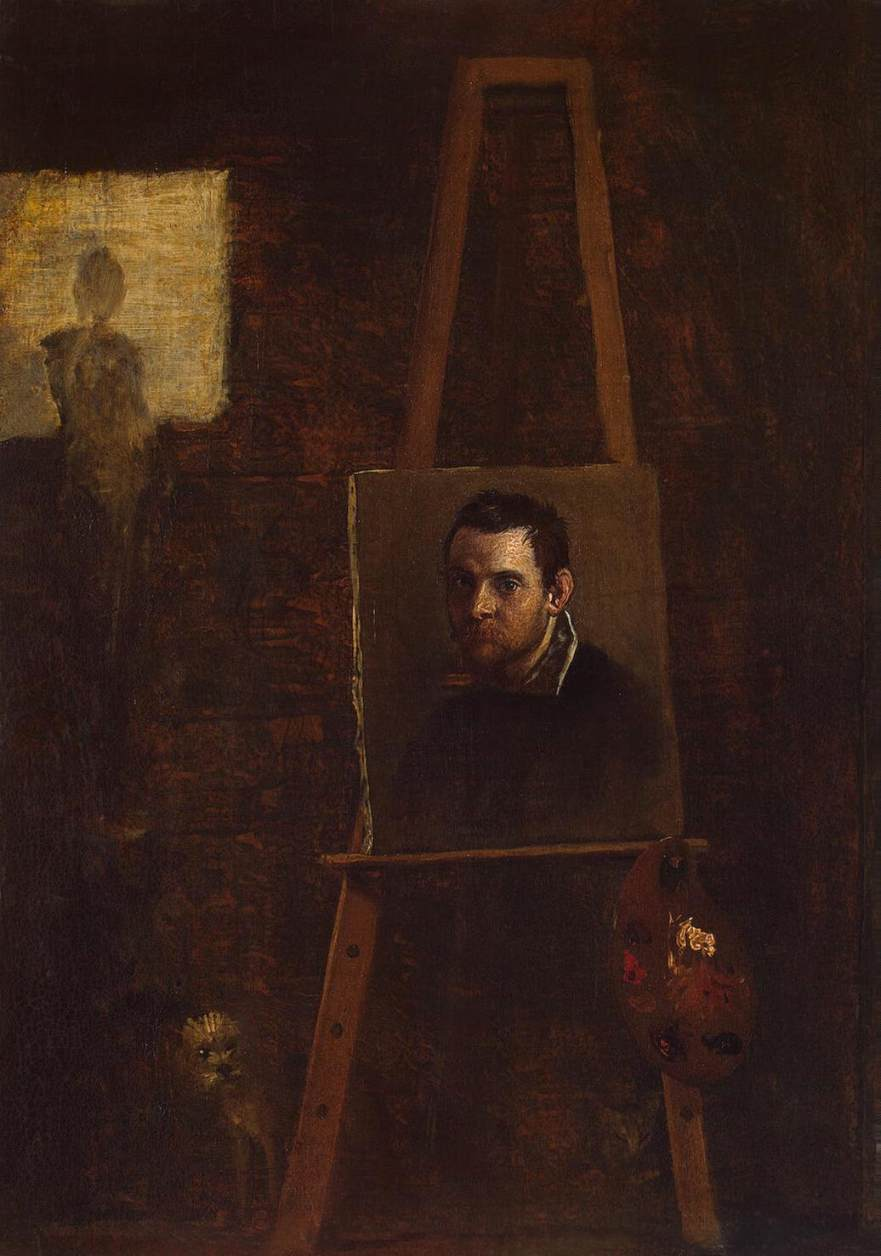
Self-portrait

Annibale Carracci was born in Bologna, was likely first apprenticed within his family, and probably trained by his cousin, Ludovico as well as by the painter Bartolomeo Passarotti. In 1582, the Annibale, Agostino, and Ludovico opened a painters' studio, initially called by some the Academy of the Desiderosi (desirous of fame and learning) and subsequently the Incamminati (progressives; literally "of those opening a new way"). Considered "the first major art school based on life drawing", the Accademia degli Incamminati was the model for later art schools throughout Europe. While the Carraccis laid emphasis on the typically Florentine linear draftsmanship, as exemplified by Raphael and Andrea del Sarto, their interest in the glimmering colours and mistier edges of objects derived from the Venetian painters, notably the works of Venetian oil painter Titian, which Annibale and Agostino studied during their travels around Italy in 1580–81 at the behest of the elder Caracci, Ludovico. This eclecticism was to become the defining trait of the artists of the Baroque Emilian or Bolognese School.

In many early Bolognese works by the Carraccis, it is difficult to distinguish the individual contributions made by each. For example, the frescoes on the story of Jason for Palazzo Fava in Bologna (c. 1583–84) are signed Carracci, which suggests that they all contributed. In 1585, Annibale completed an altarpiece of the Baptism of Christ for the church of Santi Gregorio e Siro in Bologna. In 1587, he painted the Assumption for the church of San Rocco in Reggio Emilia.

In 1587–88, Annibale is known to have travelled to Parma and then Venice, where he joined his brother Agostino. From 1589 to 1592, the three Carracci brothers completed the frescoes on the Founding of Rome for Palazzo Magnani in Bologna. By 1593, Annibale had completed an altarpiece, Virgin on the throne with St John and St Catherine, in collaboration with Lucio Massari. His Resurrection of Christ also dates from 1593. In 1592, he painted an Assumption for the Bonasoni chapel in San Francesco. During 1593–94, all three Carraccis were working on frescoes in Palazzo Sampieri in Bologna.

== Frescoes in Palazzo Farnese ==
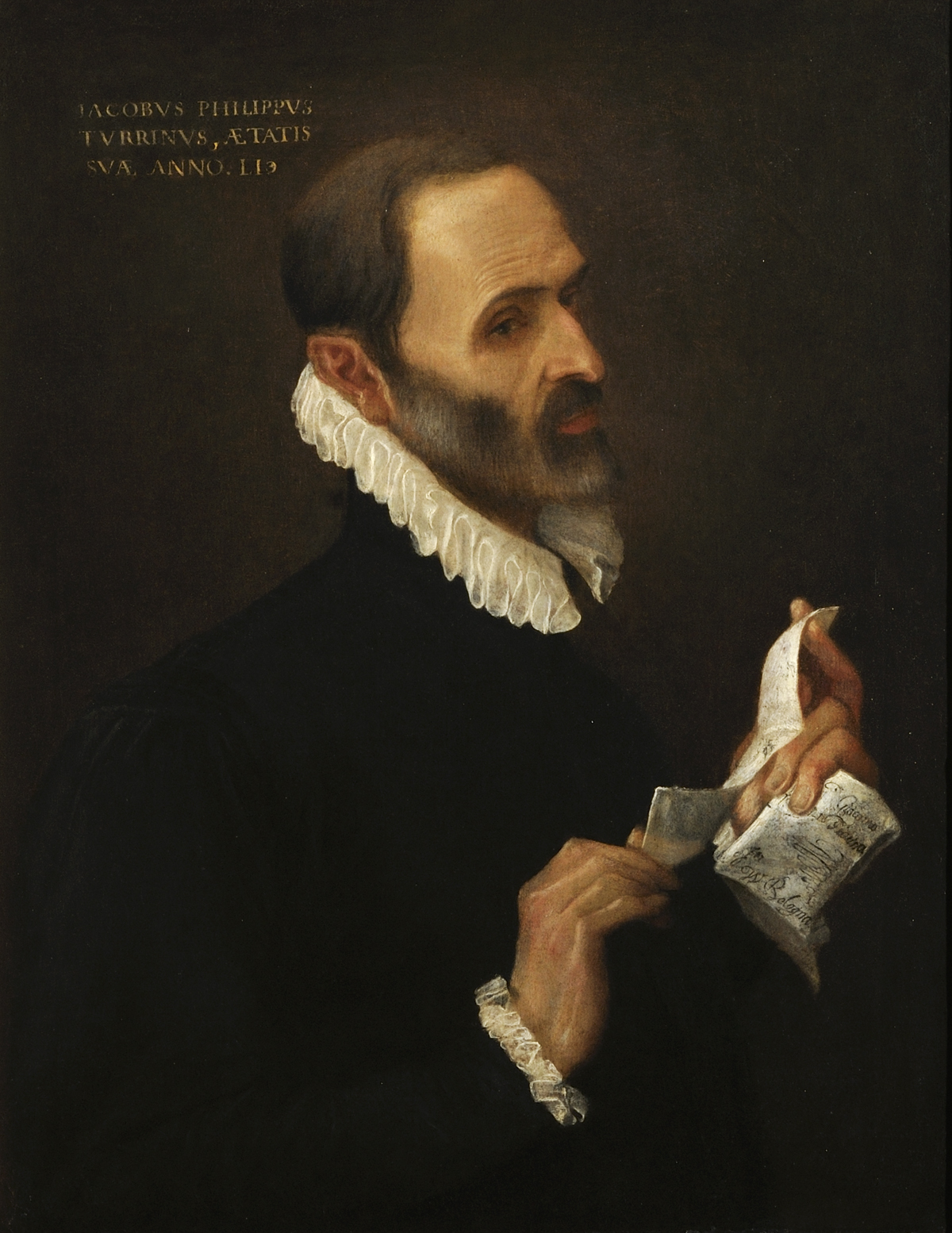
Portrait of Giacomo Filippo Turrini

Based on the prolific and masterful frescoes by the Carracci in Bologna, Annibale was recommended by the Duke of Parma, Ranuccio I Farnese, to his brother, the Cardinal Odoardo Farnese, who wished to decorate the piano nobile of the cavernous Roman Palazzo Farnese. In November–December 1595, Annibale and Agostino traveled to Rome to begin decorating the Camerino with stories of Hercules, appropriate since the room housed the famous Greco-Roman antique sculpture of the hypermuscular Farnese Hercules.

Annibale meanwhile developed hundreds of preparatory sketches for the major work, wherein he led a team painting frescoes on the ceiling of the grand salon with the secular quadri riportati of The Loves of the Gods, or as the biographer Giovanni Bellori described it, Human Love governed by Celestial Love. Although the ceiling is riotously rich in illusionistic elements, the narratives are framed in the restrained classicism of High Renaissance decoration, drawing inspiration from, yet more immediate and intimate than, Michelangelo's Sistine Ceiling as well as Raphael's Vatican Logge and Villa Farnesina frescoes. His work would later inspire the untrammelled stream of Baroque illusionism and energy that would emerge in the grand frescoes of Cortona, Lanfranco, and in later decades Andrea Pozzo and Gaulli.

Throughout the 17th and 18th centuries, the Farnese Ceiling was considered the unrivaled masterpiece of fresco painting for its age. It was not only seen as a pattern book of heroic figure design, but also as a model of technical procedure; Annibale’s numerous preparatory drawings for the ceiling were widely studied and influenced later approaches to large-scale history painting.

== Contrast with Caravaggio ==
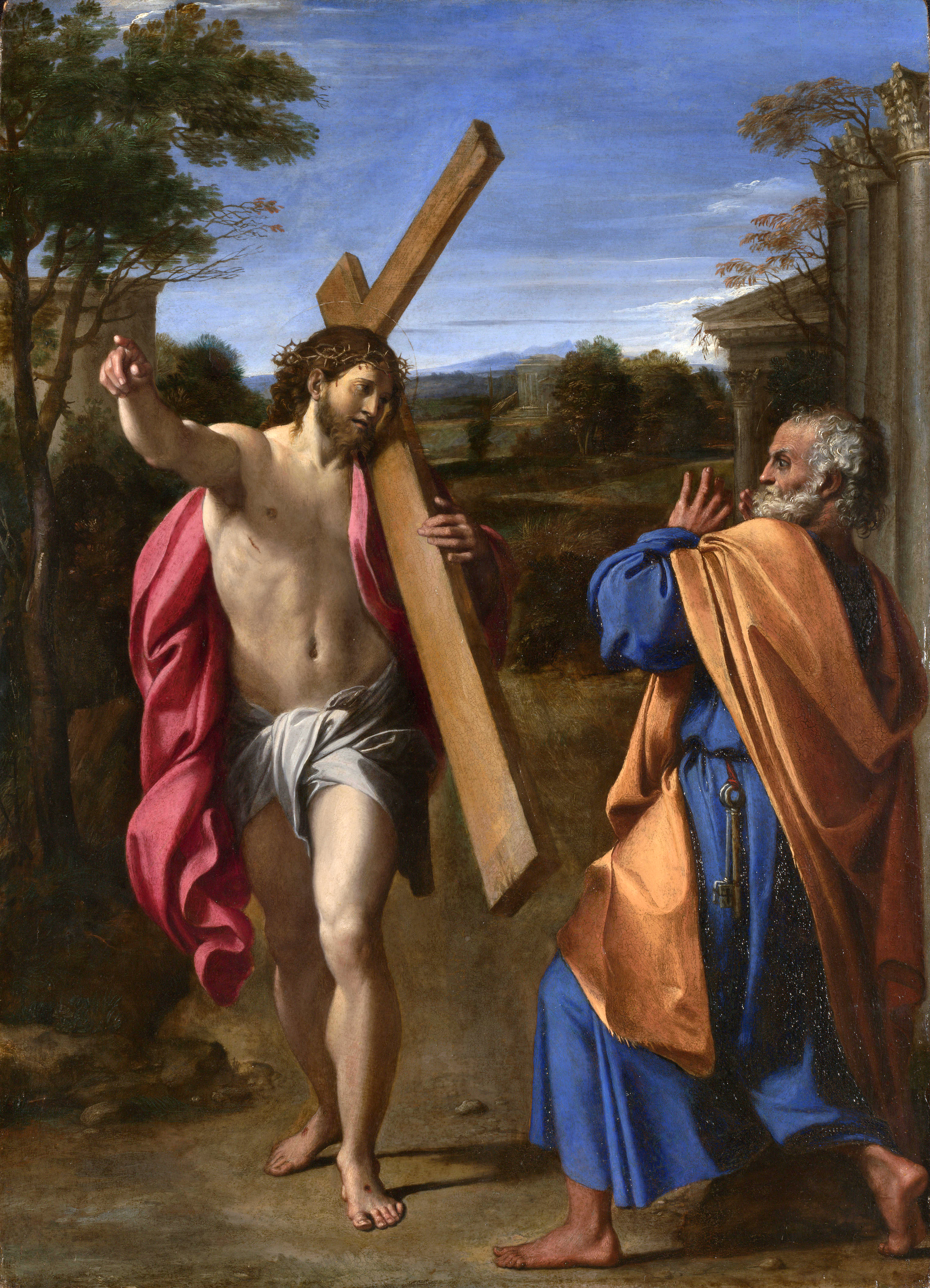
Carracci's Domine quo vadis? (Jesus and Saint Peter)

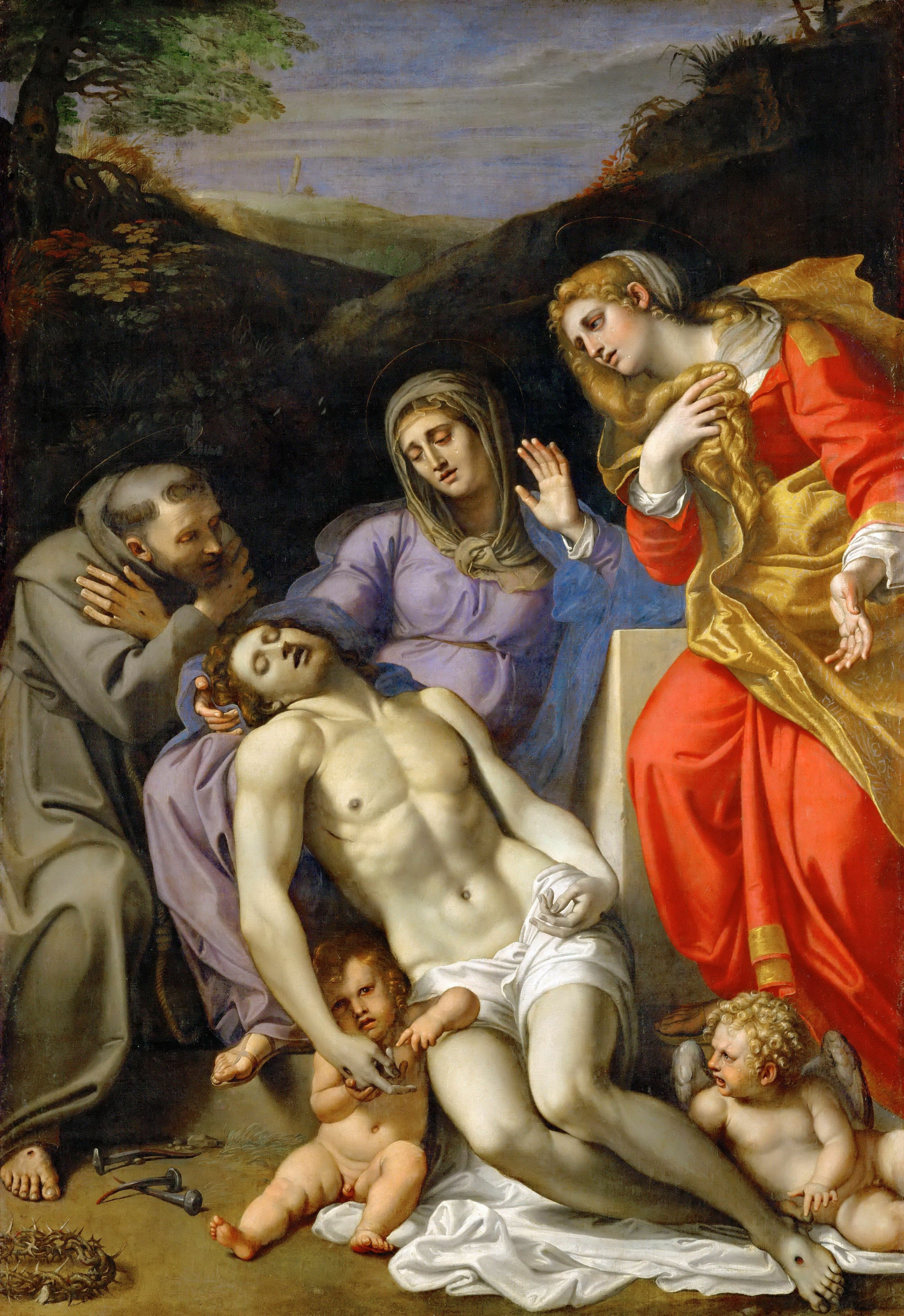
Pietà with Sts Francis and Mary Magdalen

The 17th-century critic Giovanni Bellori, in his survey entitled Idea, praised Carracci as the paragon of Italian painters, who had fostered a "renaissance" of the great tradition of Raphael and Michelangelo. On the other hand, while admitting Caravaggio's talents as a painter, Bellori deplored his over-naturalistic style, if not his turbulent morals and persona. He thus viewed the Caravaggisti styles with the same gloomy dismay. Painters were urged to depict the Platonic ideal of beauty, not Roman street-walkers. Yet Carracci and Caravaggio patrons and pupils did not all fall into irreconcilable camps. Contemporary patrons, such as Marquess Vincenzo Giustiniani, found both showed excellence in maniera and modeling.

By the 21st century, scholarly and public interest in Caravaggio's dramatic style had grown considerably, sometimes drawing less attention to Carracci's influence on Baroque fresco traditions. Caravaggio almost never worked in fresco, regarded as the test of a great painter's mettle. On the other hand, Carracci is particularly noted for his frescoes. Thus the somber canvases of Caravaggio, with benighted backgrounds, are suited to the contemplative altars, and not to well-lit walls or ceilings such as this one in the Farnese. Wittkower was surprised that a Farnese cardinal surrounded himself with frescoes of libidinous themes, indicative of a "considerable relaxation of counter-reformatory morality". This thematic choice suggests Carracci may have been more rebellious relative to the often-solemn religious passion of Caravaggio's canvases. According to art historian Rudolf Wittkower, Carracci's frescoes express "a tremendous joie de vivre" and mark "a new blossoming of vitality."

In the 21st century, most connoisseurs making the pilgrimage to the Cerasi Chapel in Santa Maria del Popolo would ignore Carracci's Assumption of the Virgin altarpiece (1600–1601) and focus on the flanking Caravaggio works. It is instructive to compare Carracci's Assumption with Caravaggio's Death of the Virgin. Among early contemporaries, Carracci was an innovator. He re-enlivened Michelangelo's visual fresco vocabulary, and posited a muscular and vivaciously brilliant pictorial landscape, which had increasingly reflected the complexity and artificiality characteristic of the Mannerist style. While Michelangelo could bend and contort the body into all the possible perspectives, Carracci’s treatment of the human figure in the Farnese frescoes demonstrated a dynamic approach to form and movement. The "ceiling"-frontiers, the wide expanses of walls to be frescoed would, for the next decades, be thronged by the monumental brilliance of the Carracci followers, and not Caravaggio's followers.

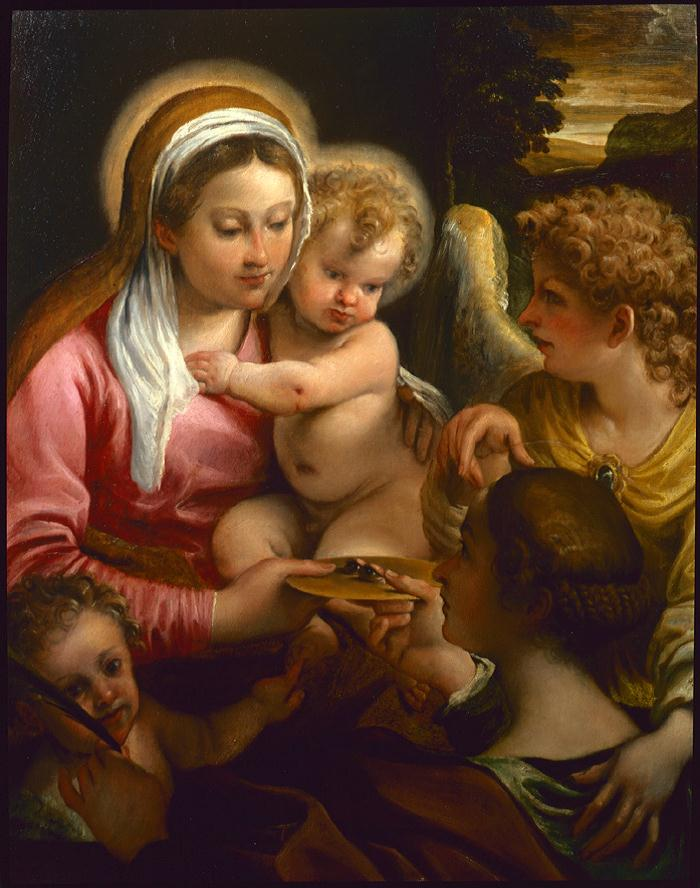
Madonna and Child with Saint Lucy, the Infant Saint John the Baptist and an Angel

In the century following his death, to a lesser extent than Bernini and Cortona, Carracci and baroque art in general came under criticism from neoclassic critics such as Winckelmann and even later from the prudish John Ruskin, as well as admirers of Caravaggio. Carracci in part was spared opprobrium because he was seen as an emulator of the highly admired Raphael, and in the Farnese frescoes, attentive to the proper themes such as those of antique mythology.

== Landscapes, genre art and drawings ==
On July 8, 1595, Annibale completed the painting of Saint Roch Giving Alms, displayed in Dresden Gemäldegalerie. Other significant late works painted by Carracci in Rome include Domine quo vadis? (c. 1602), which reveals a striking economy in figure composition and a force and precision of gesture that influenced on Poussin and through him, the language of gesture in painting.

Carracci was remarkably eclectic in thematic, painting landscapes, genre scenes, and portraits, including a series of autoportraits across the ages. He was one of the first Italian painters to paint a canvas wherein landscape took priority over figures, such as his masterful The Flight into Egypt; this is a genre in which he was followed by Domenichino (his favorite pupil) and Claude Lorrain.

Carracci's work had a less formal side that came out in his ritrattino caricato or caricatures–which, in early modern discussions on art, Carracci was mistakenly credited with inventing–and in his early genre paintings such as The Beaneater, thought to be influenced by Passarotti. He has been described by biographers as inattentive to dress, obsessed with work: his self-portraits (such as that in Parma) vary in his depiction.

== Under a melancholic humor ==
It is not clear how much work Annibale completed after finishing the major gallery in the Palazzo Farnese. In 1606, Annibale signed a Madonna of the bowl. However, in a letter from April 1606, Cardinal Odoardo Farnese bemoaned that a "heavy melancholic humor" prevented Annibale from painting for him. Throughout 1607, Annibale was unable to complete a commission for the Duke of Modena of a Nativity. There is a note from 1608, where in Annibale stipulates to a pupil that he will spend at least two hours a day in his studio. There is little documentation from the man or time to explain why his brush was stilled.

In 1609, Annibale died and was buried, according to his wish, near Raphael in the Pantheon of Rome. It is a measure of his achievement that artists as diverse as Bernini, Poussin, and Rubens praised his work. Many of his assistants or pupils in projects at the Palazzo Farnese and Herrera Chapel would become among the pre-eminent artists of the next decades, including Domenichino, Francesco Albani, Giovanni Lanfranco, Domenico Viola, Guido Reni, Sisto Badalocchio, and others.

== Chronology of works ==
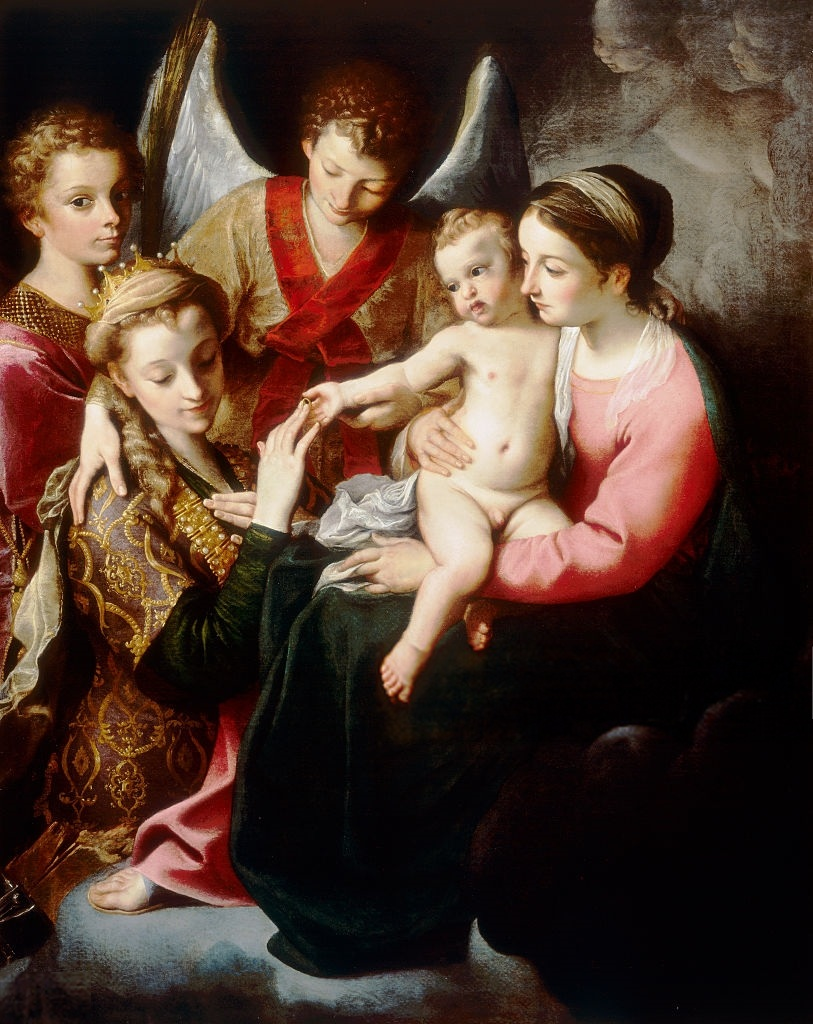
The Mystic Marriage of St Catherine

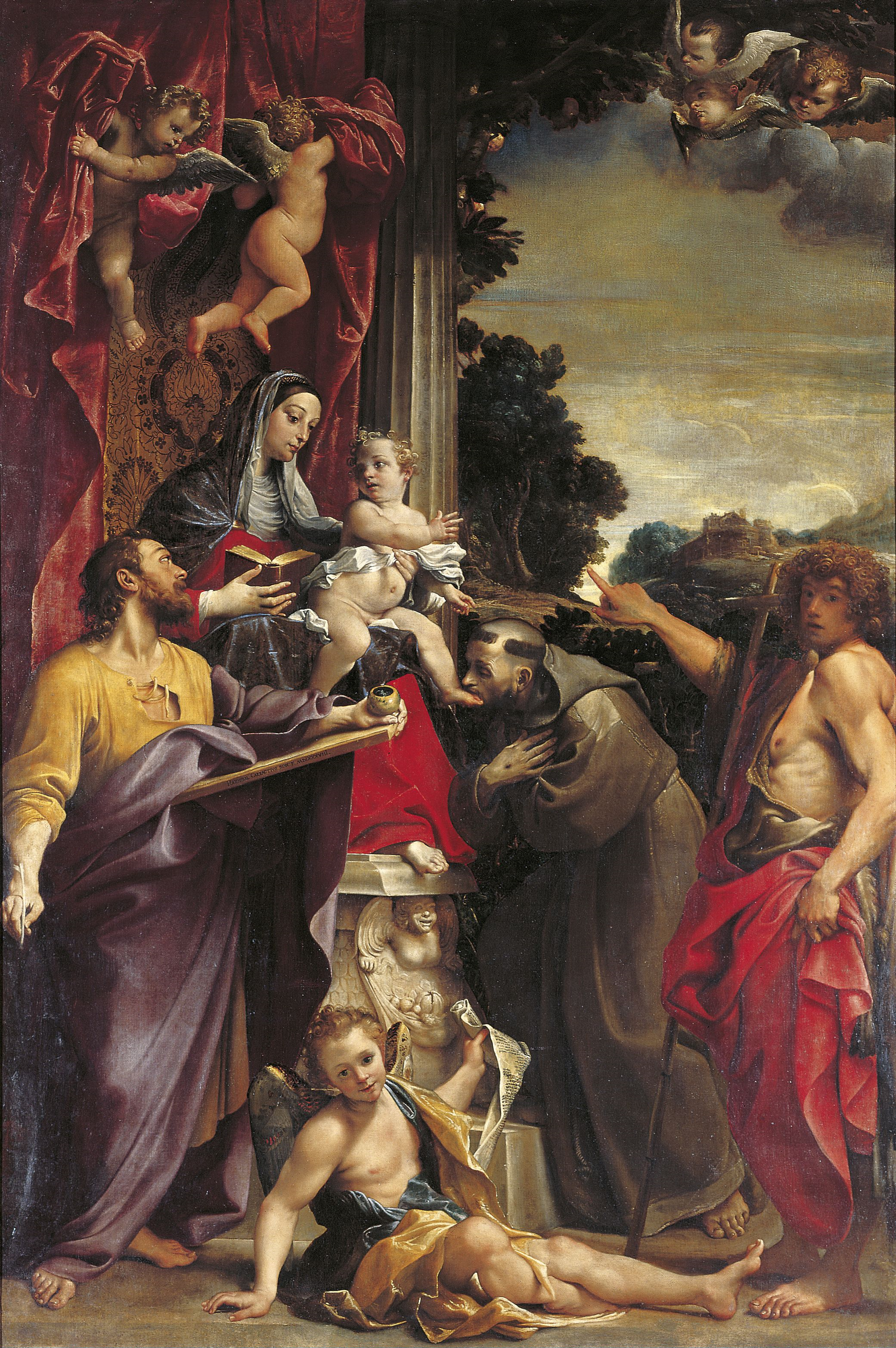
Madonna Enthroned with Saint Matthew

=== Paintings ===
- Butcher's Shop (1580s)—Oil on canvas, 185 × 266 cm, Christ Church Picture Gallery, Oxford
- The Beaneater (1580–1590)—Oil on canvas, 57 × 68 cm, Galleria Colonna, Rome
- Descent from the Cross (1580–1600)—St Ann's Church, Manchester
- Crucifixion with Saints (1583)—Oil on canvas, 305 × 210 cm, Santa Maria della Carità, Bologna
- The Laughing Youth (1583)—Oil on paper, Galleria Borghese, Rome
- Corpse of Christ (c. 1583–1585)—Oil on canvas, 70.7 × 88.8 cm, Staatsgalerie Stuttgart
- The Baptism of Christ (1584)—Oil on canvas, Santi Gregorio e Siro, Bologna
- An Allegory of Truth and Time (1584–1585)—Royal Collection (Hampton Court)
- Pietà with Saints Clare, Francis and Mary Magdalene (1585)—Oil on canvas, Galleria nazionale di Parma, Parma
- The Mystic Marriage of St Catherine (1585–1587)—Oil on canvas, Museo Nazionale di Capodimonte, Naples
- Madonna Enthroned with St Matthew (1588)—Oil on canvas, 384 × 255 cm, Gemäldegalerie, Dresden
- Venus with a Satyr and Two Cupids (c. 1588)—Oil on canvas, 112 × 142 cm, Uffizi, Florence
- Self-Portrait in Profile (1590s)—Oil on canvas, Uffizi, Florence
- Assumption of the Virgin (c. 1590)—Oil on canvas, 130 × 97 cm, Museo del Prado
- Madonna and Child with Saints
- The Virgin Appears to the Saints Luke and Catherine (1592)—Oil on canvas, 401 × 226 cm, Musée du Louvre, Paris
- Fishing (before 1595)—Oil on canvas, 136 × 253 cm, Musée du Louvre
- Hunting (before 1595)—Oil on canvas, 136 × 253 cm, Musée du Louvre
- Venus, Adonis and Cupid (c. 1595)—Oil on canvas, 212 × 268 cm, Museo del Prado, Madrid
- Saint Roch Giving Alms (1595)—Oil on canvas, Gemäldegalerie, Dresden
- The Choice of Heracles (c. 1596)—Oil on canvas, 167 × 273 cm, Museo Nazionale di Capodimonte, Naples
- Mocking of Christ (c. 1596)—Oil on canvas, 60 × 69.5 cm, Pinacoteca Nazionale
- Jupiter and Juno (c. 1597)—Farnese Gallery, Rome
- Frescoes (1597–1605) in the Palazzo Farnese, Rome
- River Landscape (c. 1599)—Oil on canvas, National Gallery of Art, Washington, D.C.
- Pietà (1599–1600)—Oil on canvas, 156 × 149 cm, Museo Nazionale di Capodimonte, Naples
- The Madonna and Sleeping Child with the Infant St John the Baptist (1599–1600)—Oil on canvas, 51.2 x 68.4 cm, Royal Collection (Hampton Court)
- Rest on the Flight into Egypt (c. 1600)—Oil on canvas, diameter 82.5 cm, Hermitage Museum, St. Petersburg
- The Three Marys at the Tomb (c.1600)—Oil on canvas, Hermitage Museum, St. Petersburg
- Assumption of the Virgin Mary (1600–1601)—Oil on panel, 245 × 155 cm, Santa Maria del Popolo, Rome
- Domine quo vadis? (1601–1602)—Oil on panel, 77.4 × 56.3 cm, National Gallery, London
- Pietà with Saint Francis and Saint Mary Magdalene—Oil on canvas, 277 x 186 cm, Louvre, Paris
- The Flight into Egypt (1603)—Oil on canvas, 122 × 230 cm, Galleria Doria Pamphilj, Rome
- Sleeping Venus (c. 1603)—Oil on canvas, 190 × 328 cm, Musée Condé, Chantilly, Oise
- The Martyrdom of St Stephen (1603–1604)—Oil on canvas, 51 × 68 cm, Louvre, Paris
- Self-portrait (c. 1604)—Oil on wood, 42 × 30 cm, Hermitage Museum, St. Petersburg
- Portable Altarpiece with Pietà and Saints (1604–1605)—Oil on copper and panel, 37 × 24 cm (central panel), 37 × 12 cm (each wing), Galleria Nazionale d'Arte Antica, Rome
- The Birth of the Virgin (1605–1609)—Oil on canvas, Louvre, Paris
- Lamentation of Christ (1606)—Oil on canvas, 92.8 × 103.2 cm, National Gallery, London

=== Drawings ===
- Atlante Red chalk, Louvre, Paris
- Drawings (exhibit, National Gallery of Art)

=== Works after Carracci ===
- Venus and Adonis (c. 1595)—Oil on canvas, 217 × 246 cm, Kunsthistorisches Museum, Vienna

== Paintings ==
The tradition of Italian Renaissance painting and the mature Renaissance artists like Raphael, Michelangelo, Correggio, Titian and Veronese are all painters who had a considerable influence on the work of Carracci, in his use of colours. Carraci laid the foundations for the birth of Baroque painting. The earlier sterile Mannerist style had its recovery in the Baroque painting in the early sixteenth century, succeeding in an original synthesis of many schools. The paintings of Annibale were inspired by the Venetian pictorial taste and especially the paintings of Paolo Veronese. The works that show traces of it are the Madonna Enthroned with Saint Matthew, made for Reggio Emilia and displayed in the Gemäldegalerie, Dresden, and the Mystic Marriage of Saint Catherine of Alexandria (ca. 1575), preserved at the Gallerie dell'Accademia in Venice.

Religious subjects

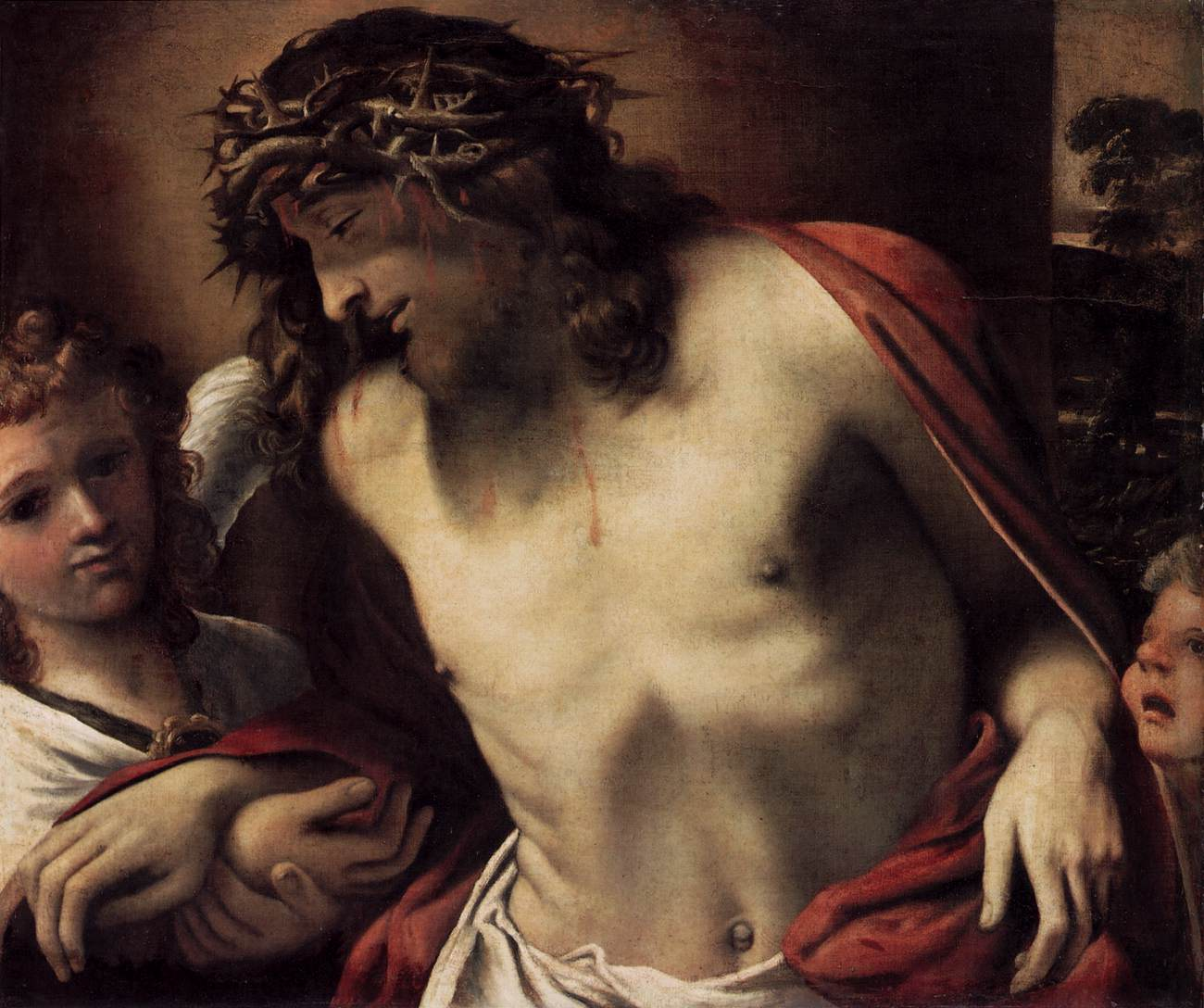
Christ Wearing the Crown of Thorns, Supported by Angels

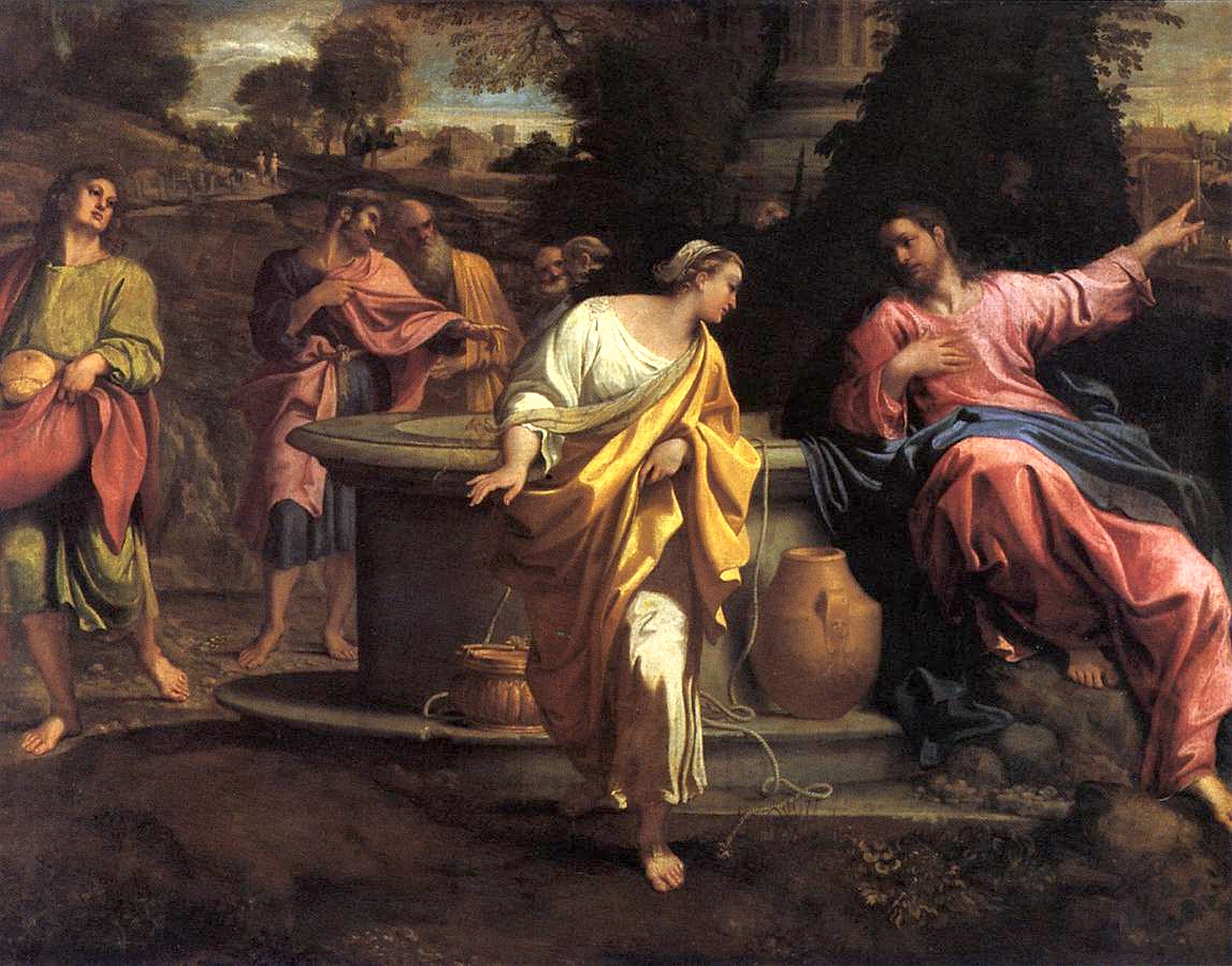
The Samaritan Woman at the Well

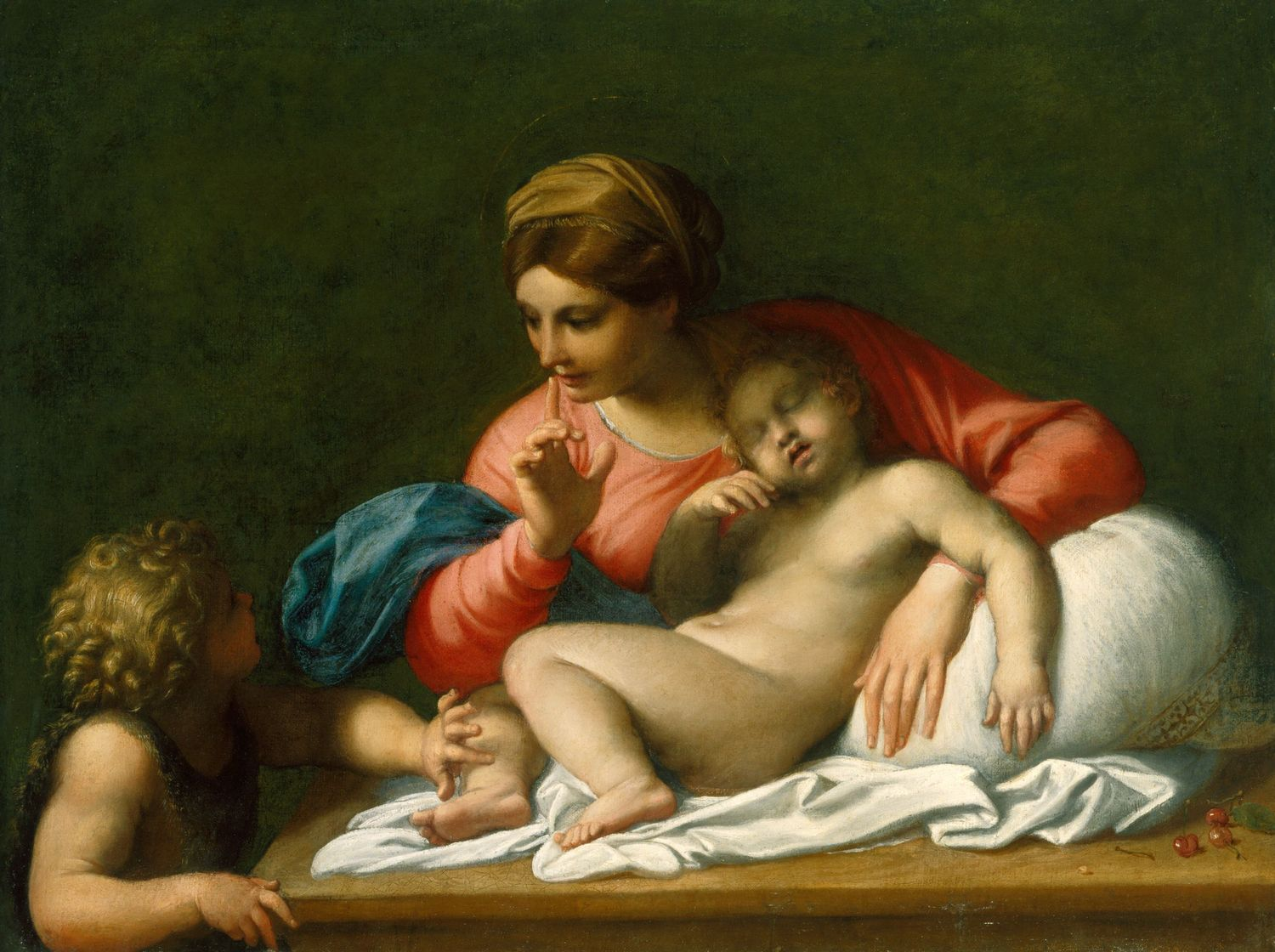
The silent Madonna with Saint John the Baptist

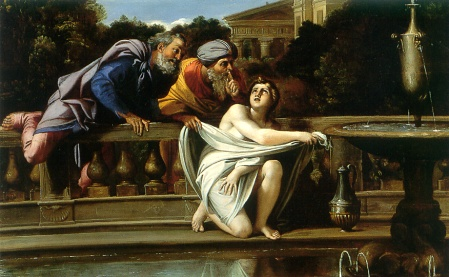
Susanna and the Elders

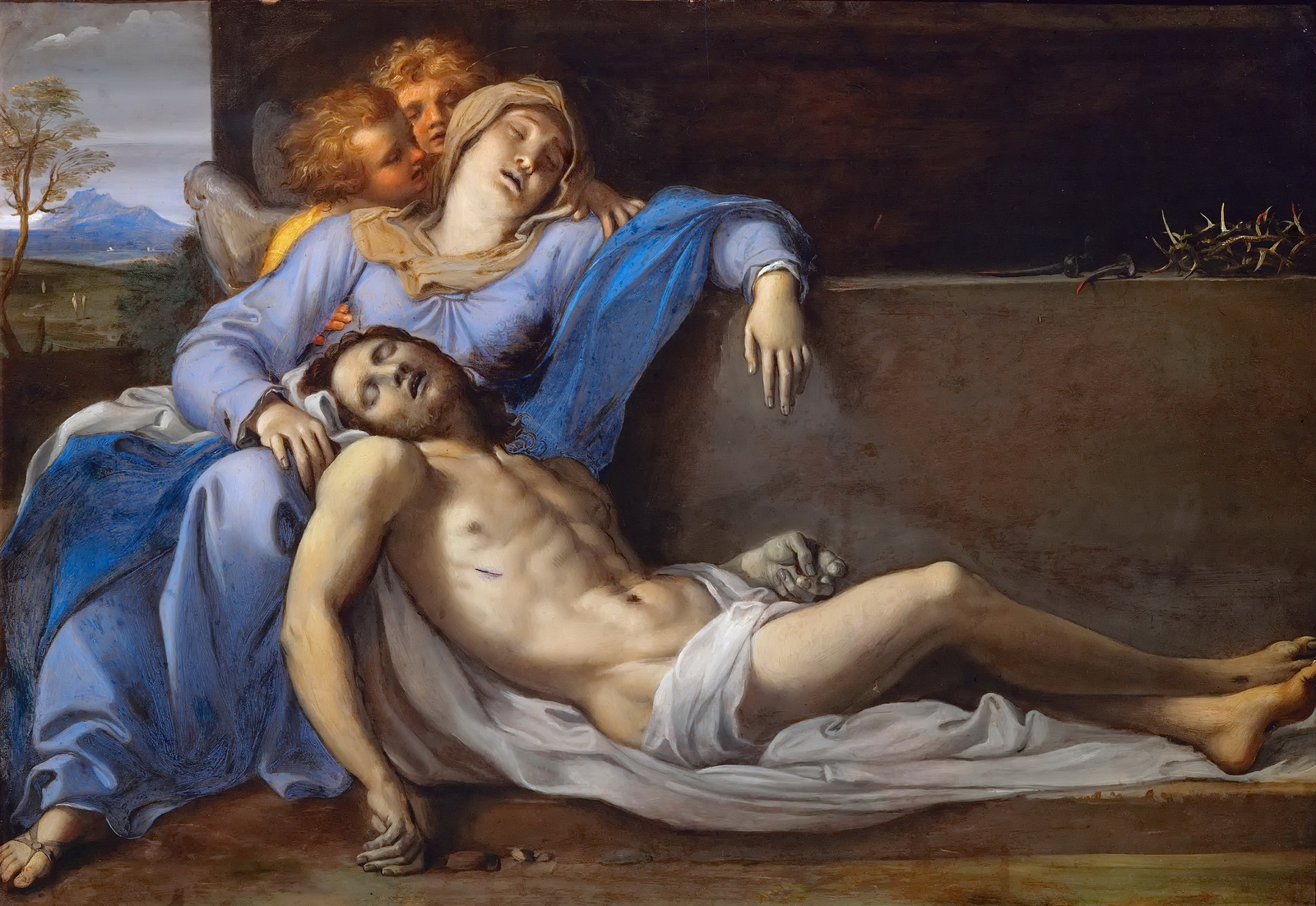
Pietà, Kunsthistoriche Museum, Vienna

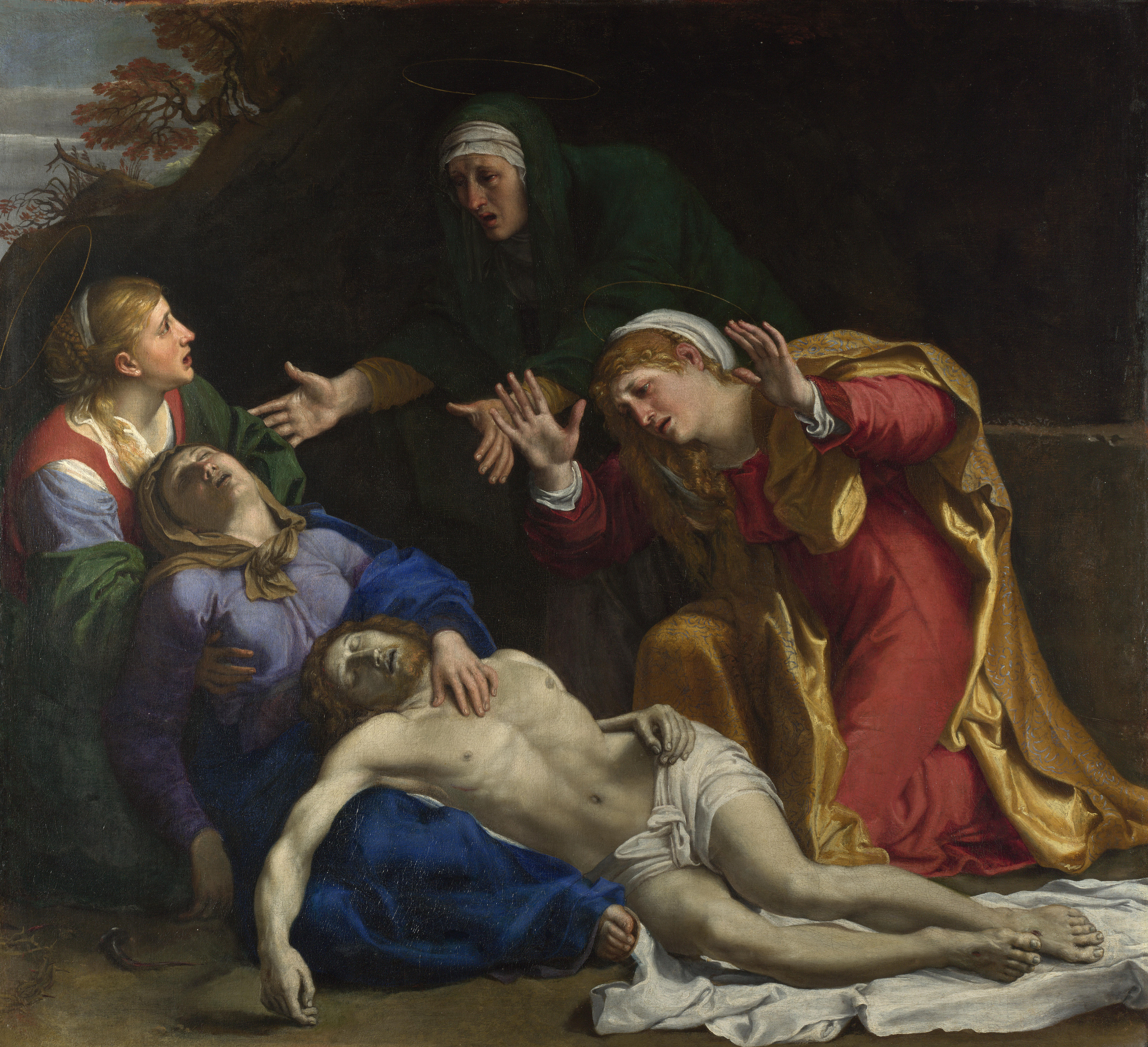
Lamentation of Christ

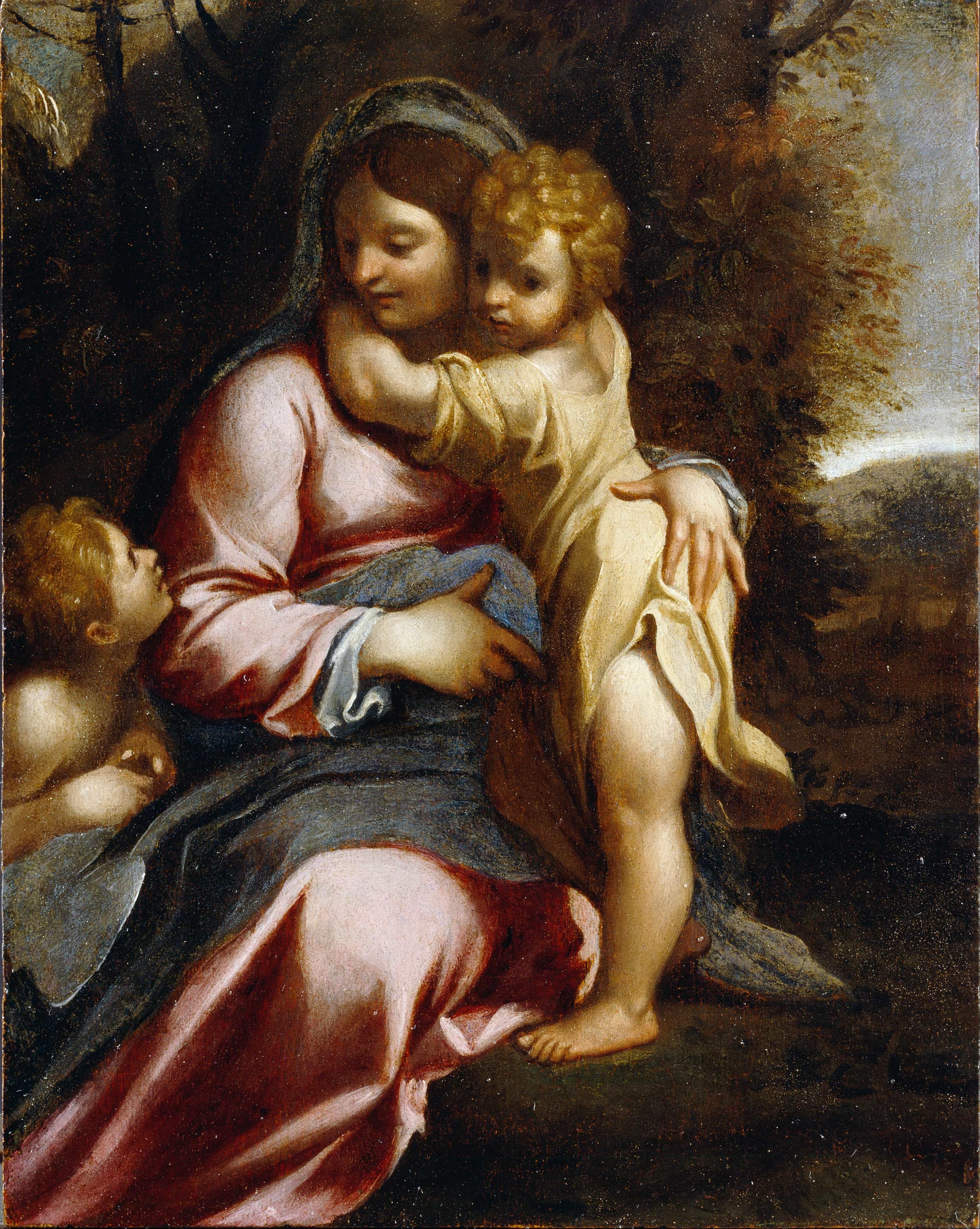
Madonna and Child with St John

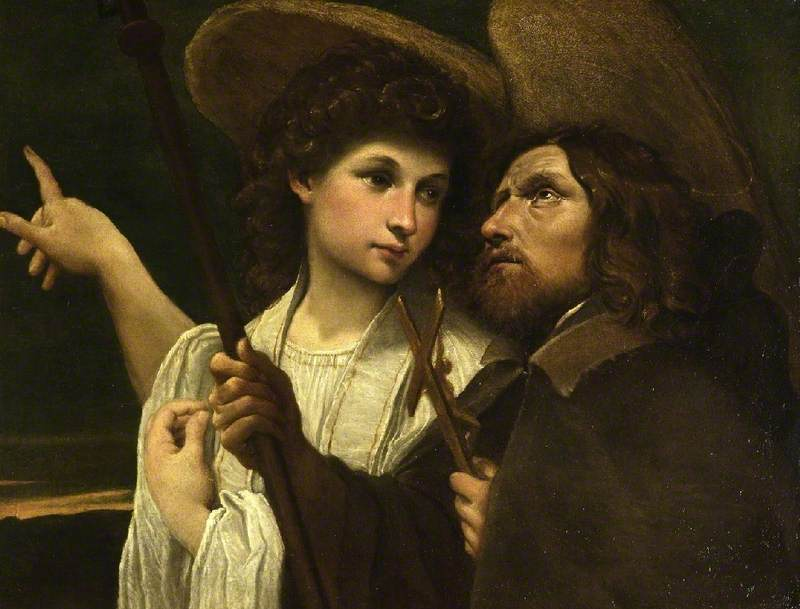
Saint Roch and the Angel
Portraits

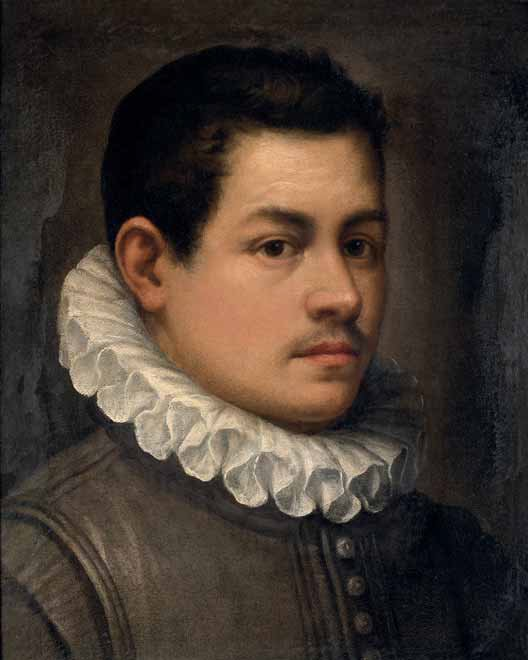
Self-portrait, c. 1580

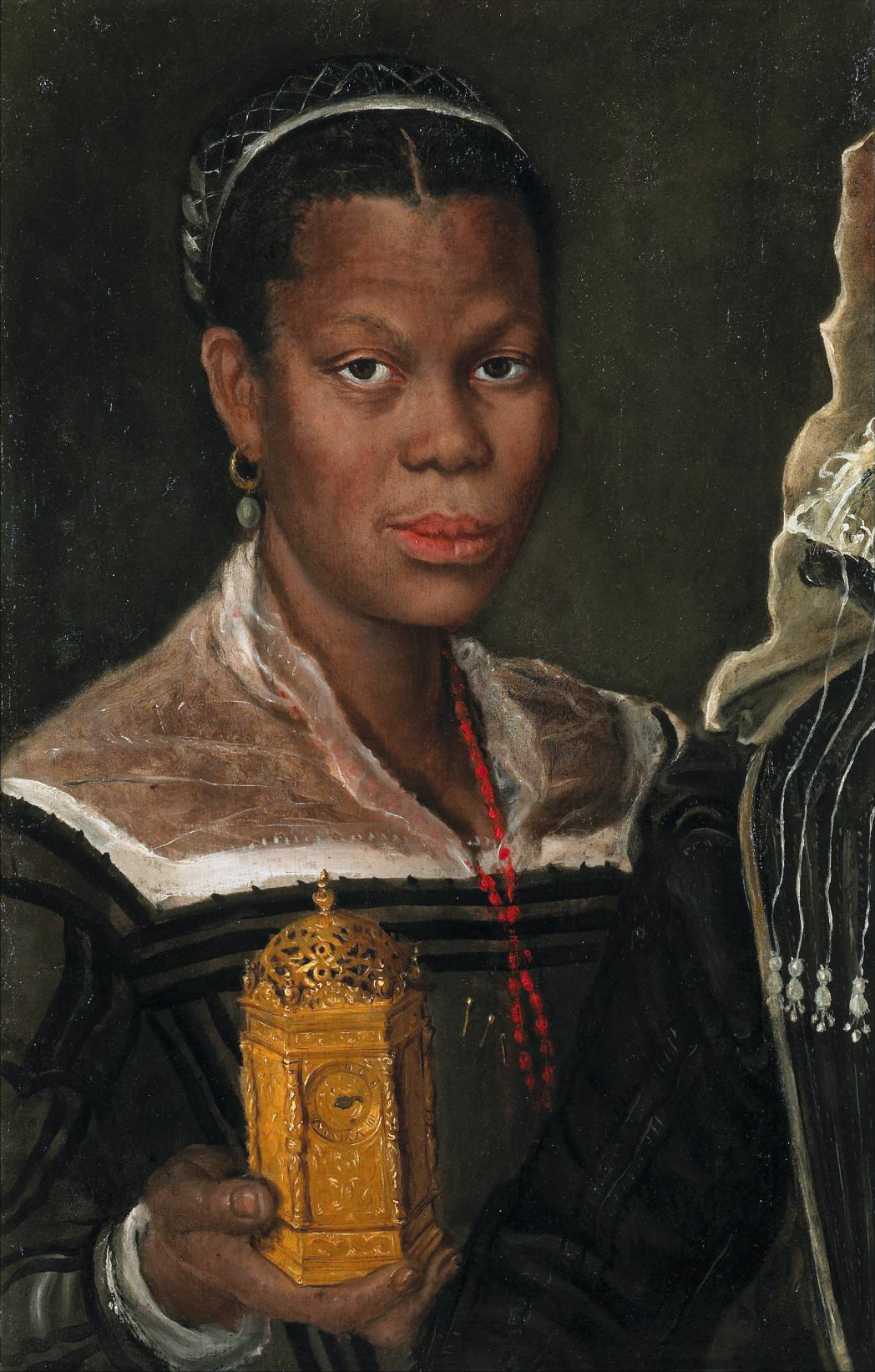
Portrait of an African Woman Holding a Clock, c. 1585

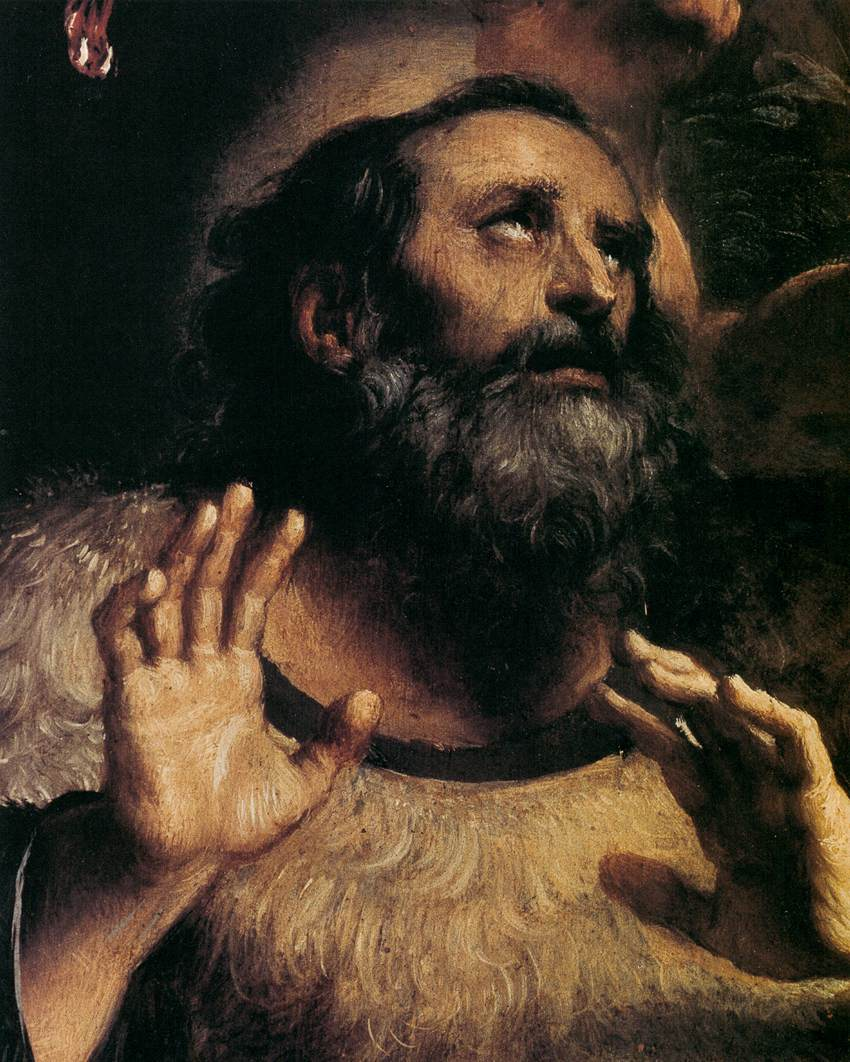
The Temptation of St Anthony Abbot (detail), 1597–98

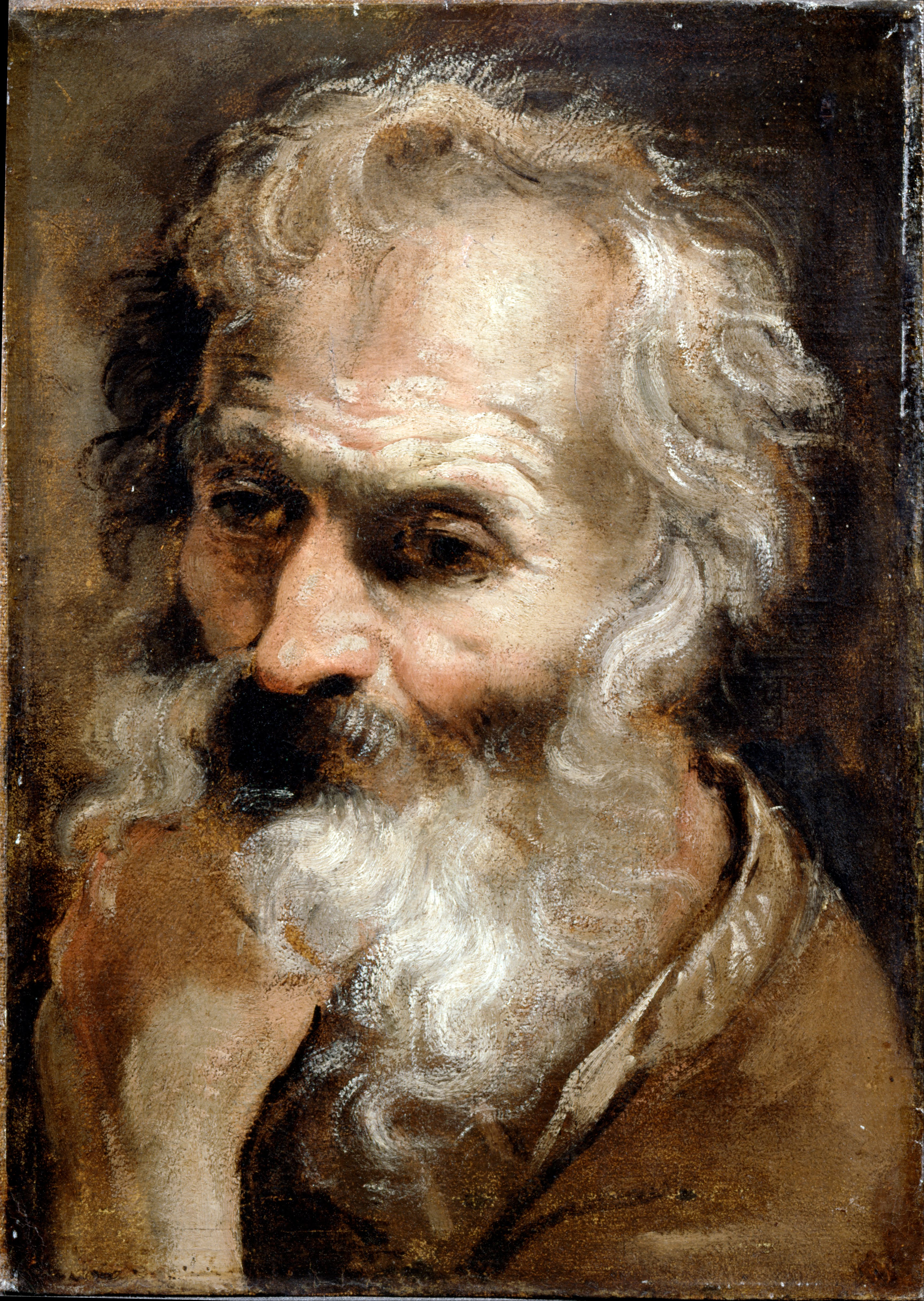
Head of an Old Man

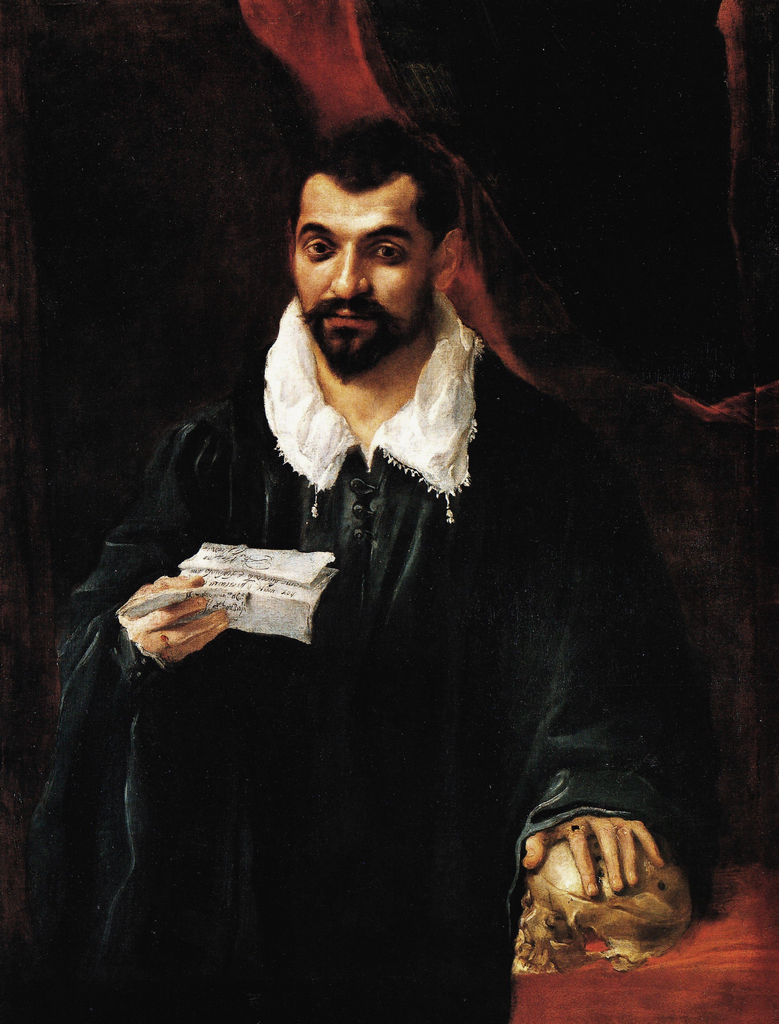
Portrait of Dr Bossi
Mythological subjects

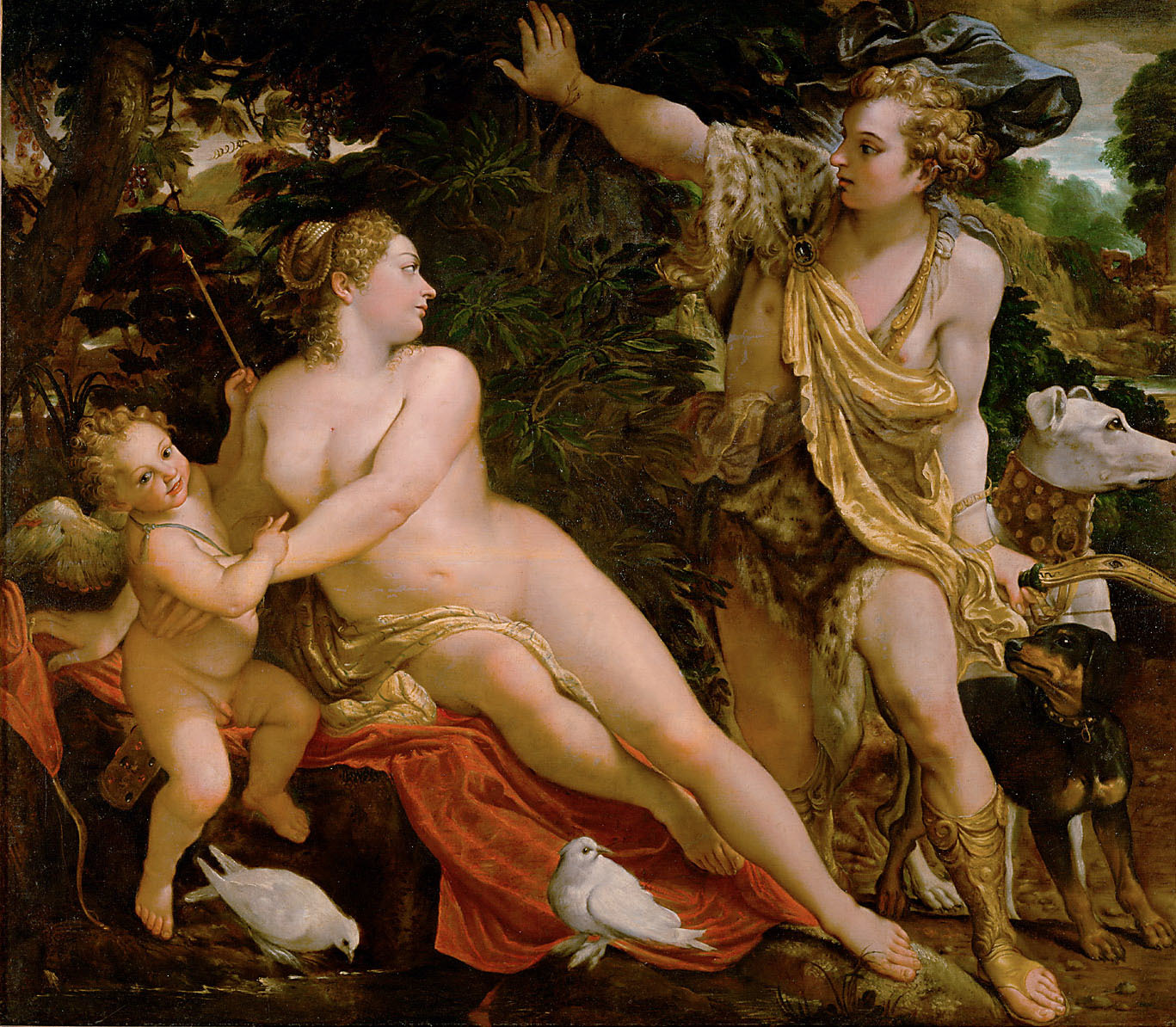
Venus and Adonis, c. 1595

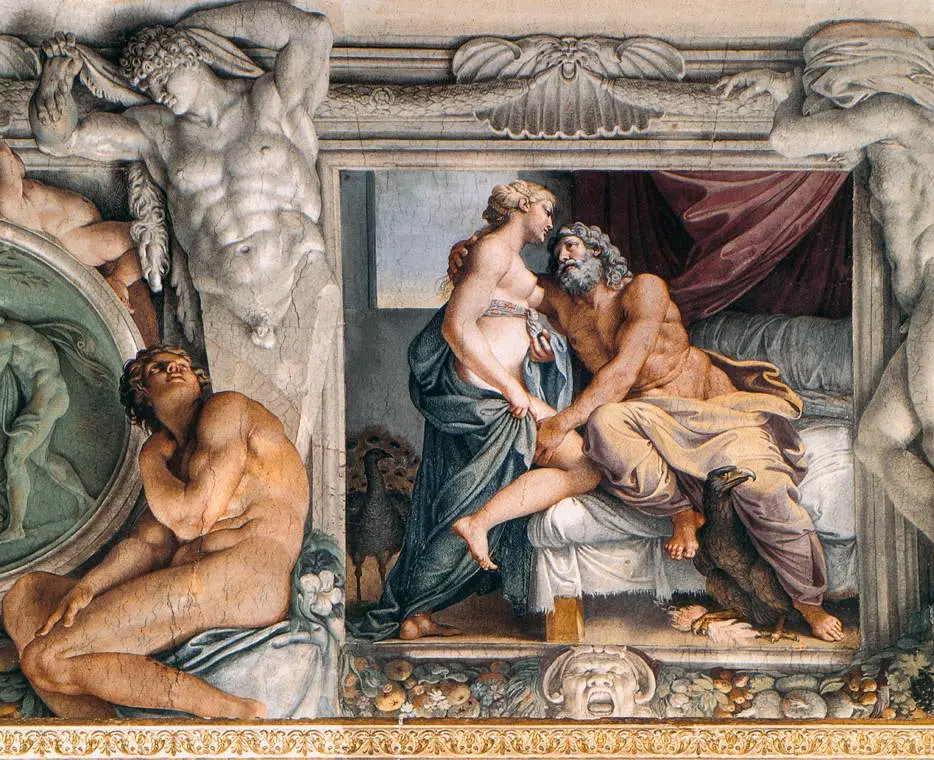
Jupiter and Juno, 1602, Palazzo Farnese

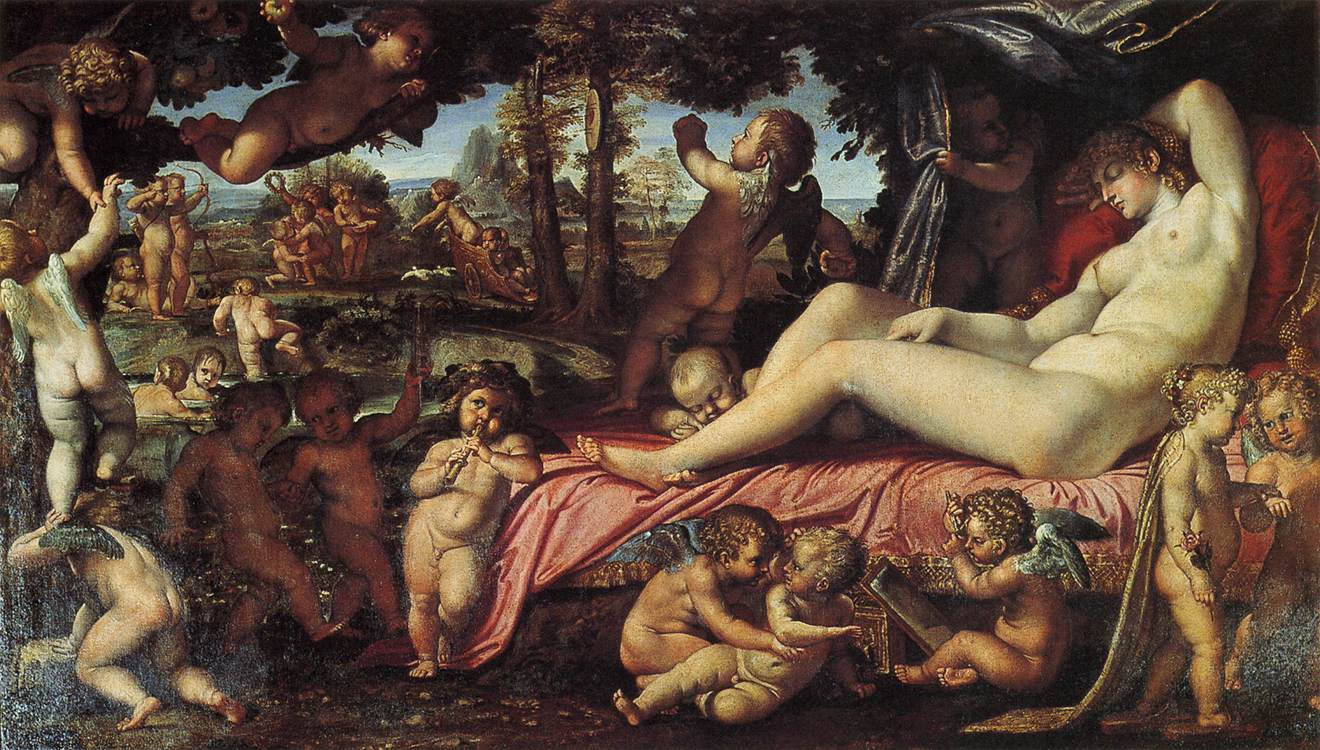
Sleeping Venus

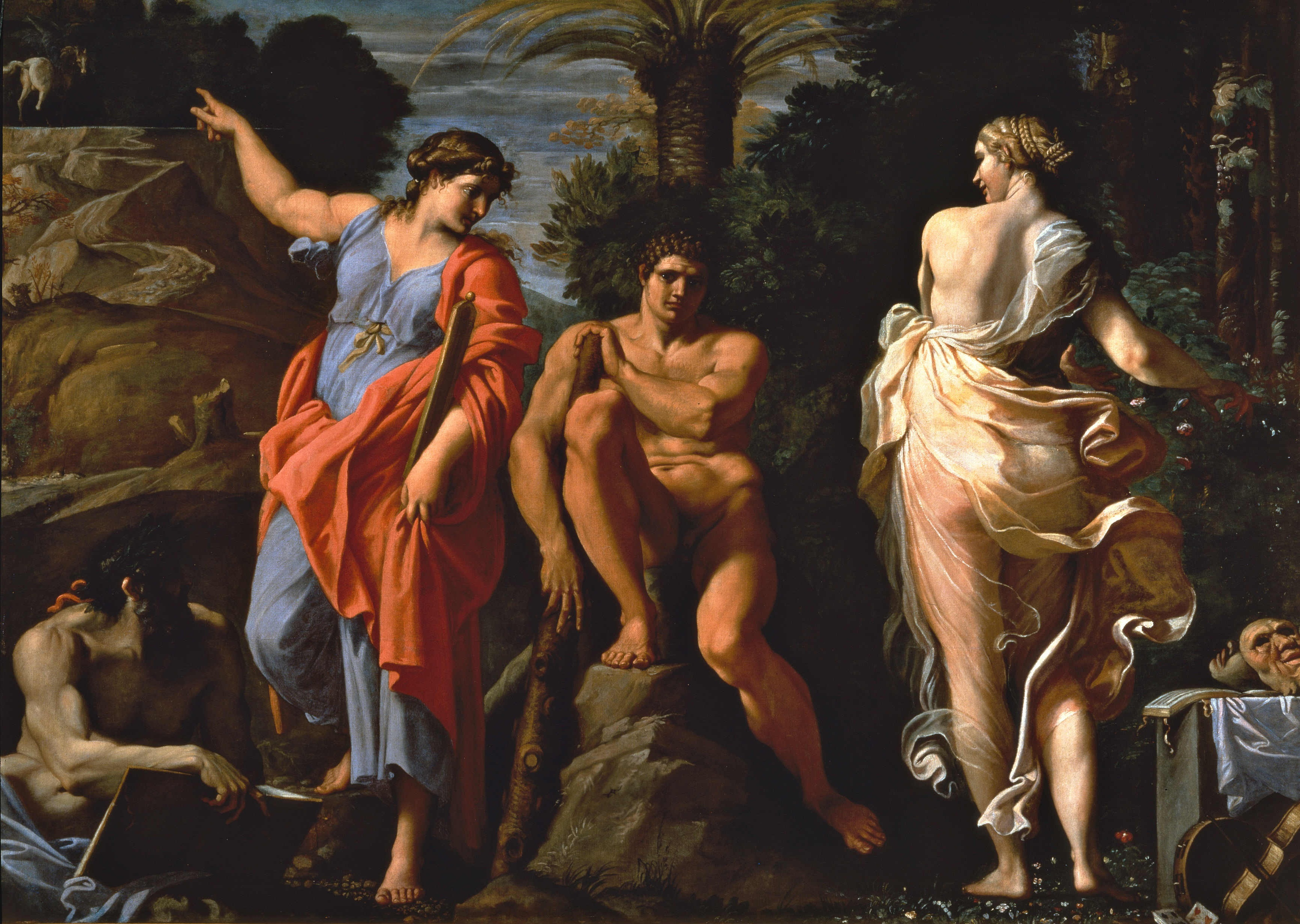
The Judgment of Hercules, 1596, National Museum of Capodimonte

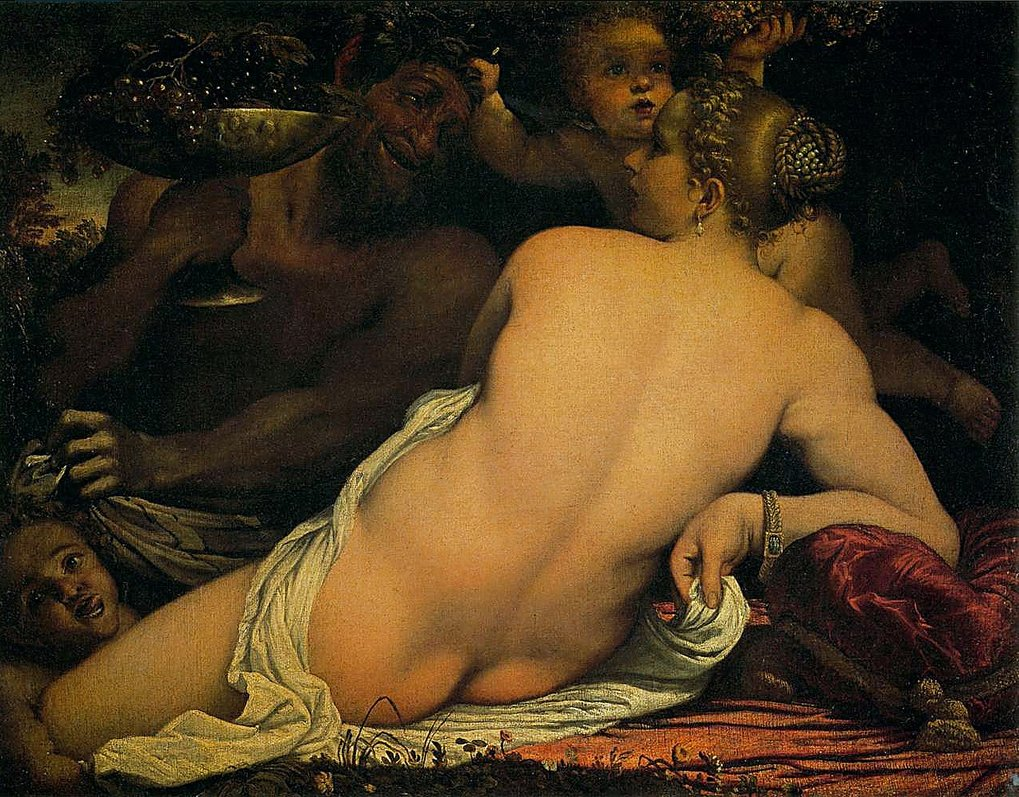
Venus with a Satyr and Two Cupids, 1590
Food related paintings

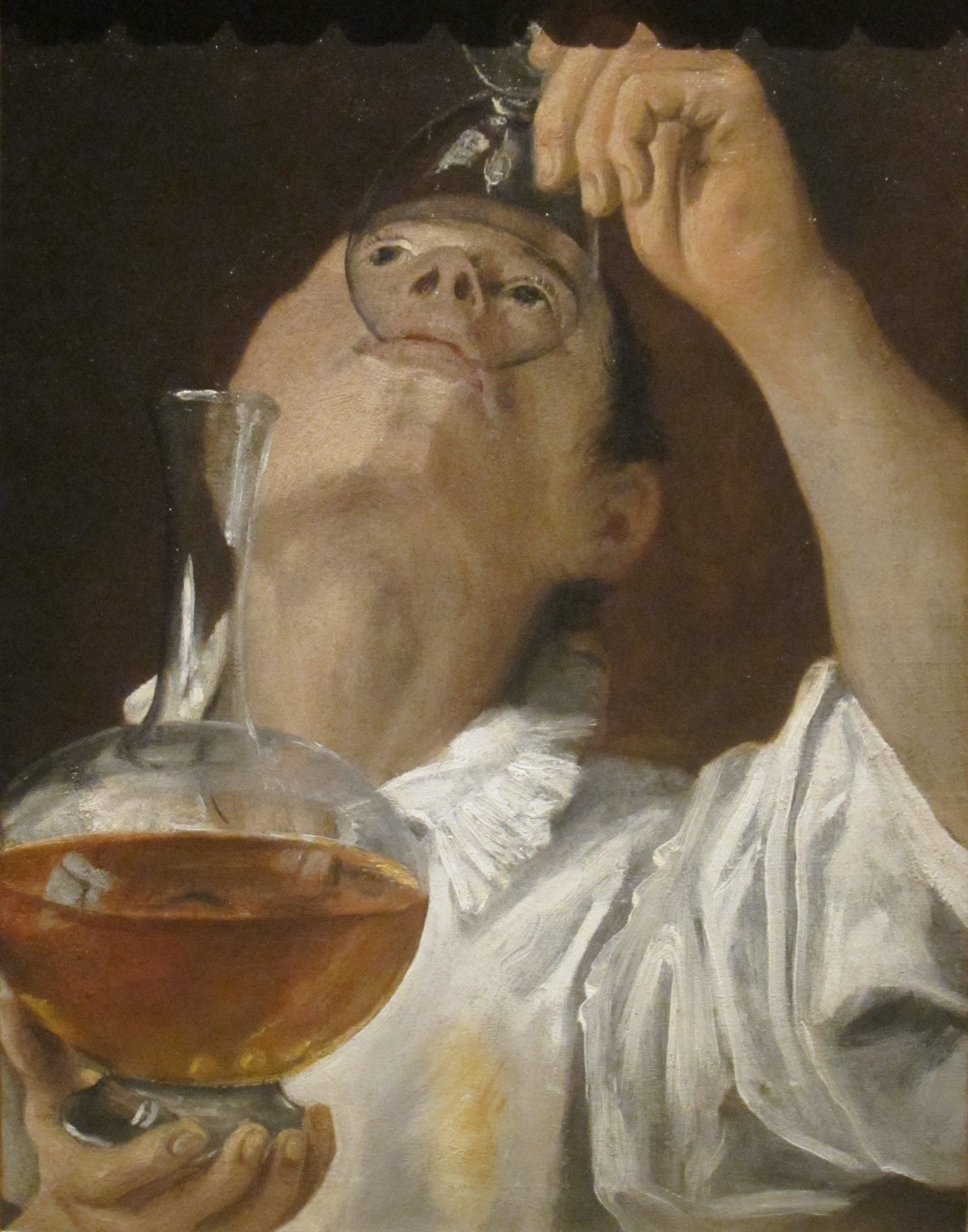
Boy Drinking by Annibale Carracci, 1582–83

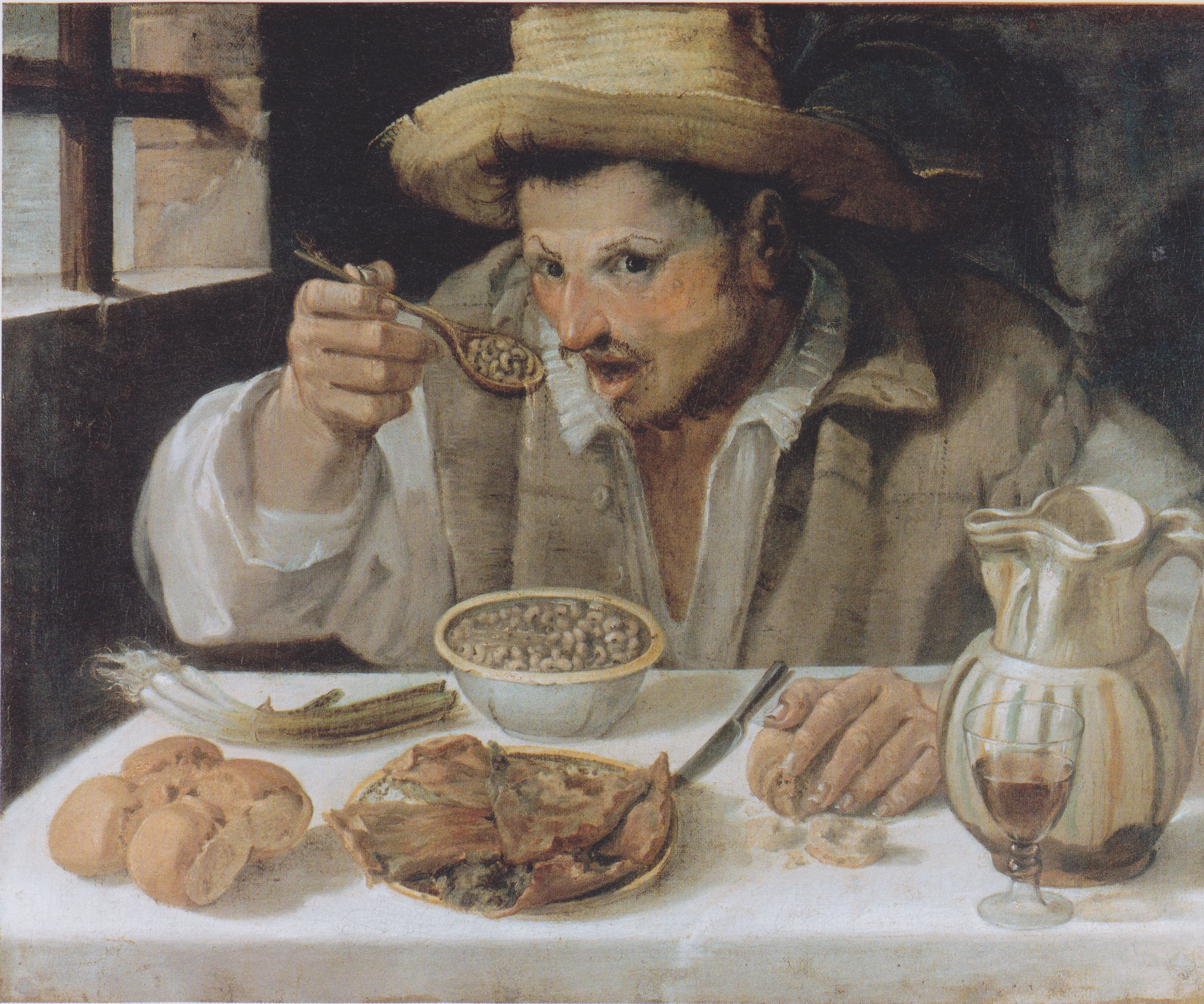
The Beaneater, 1580–1590, Galleria Colonna, Rome

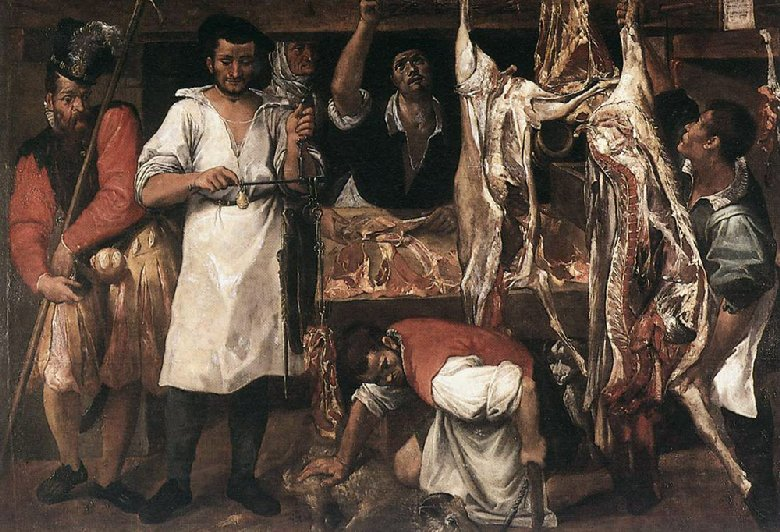
Butcher's Shop, 1580, Christ Church Picture Gallery, Oxford

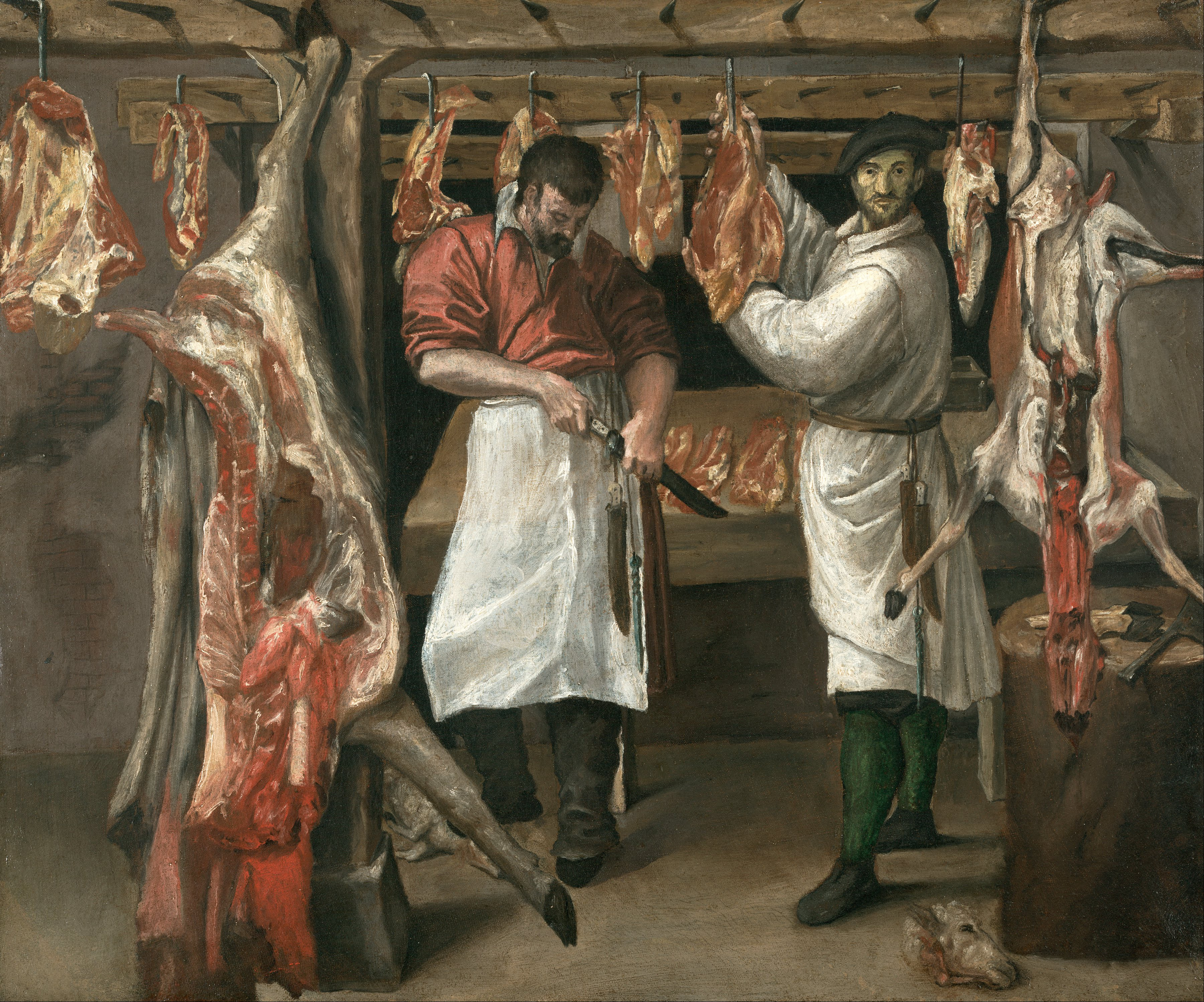
The Butcher's Shop, 1580, Kimbell Art Museum
