= The Mystic Marriage of St Catherine (Annibale Carracci) =

Painting by Annibale Carracci

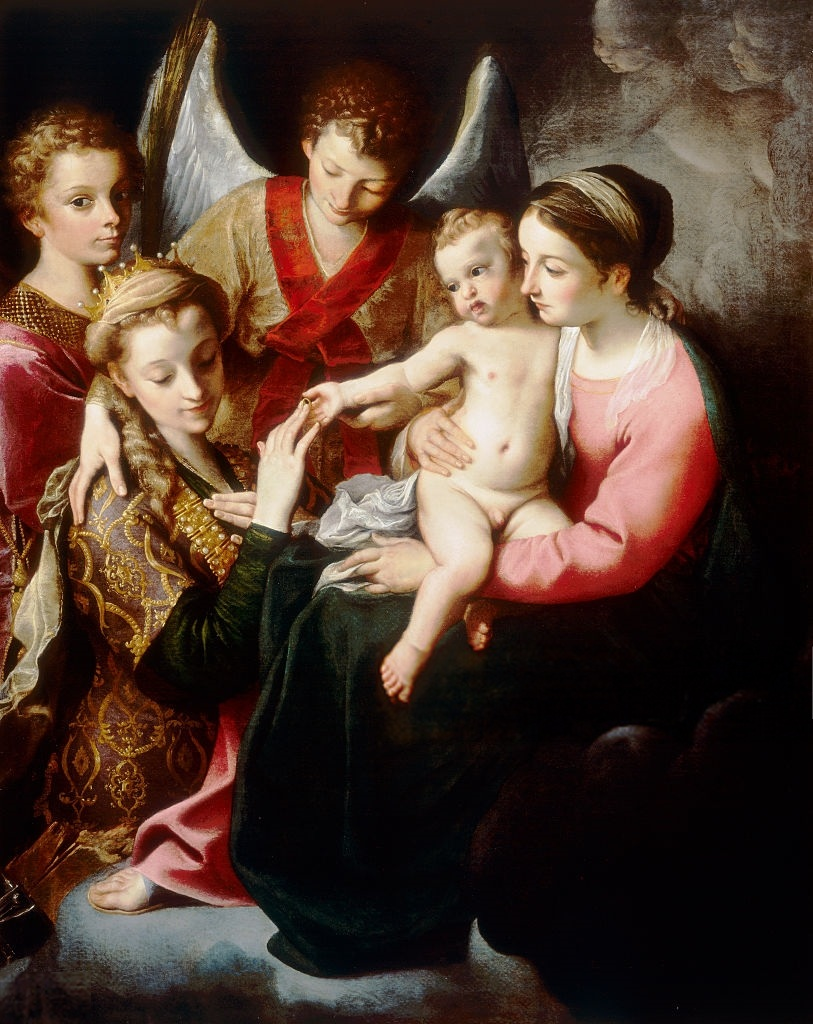
The Mystic Marriage of St Catherine (c. 1585)

The Mystic Marriage of St Catherine is an oil painting on canvas executed c.1585 by the Italian painter Annibale Carracci, now in the Gallerie Nazionali di Capodimonte in Naples, Italy. The composition and sfumato effect owe much to Correggio, particularly the latter's painting of the same subject now in the Louvre.

As shown by the label on the reverse, the work formed part of the Farnese collection, where it was mentioned by Carlo Cesare Malvasia (1678) and Giovanni Pietro Bellori (1672), with the latter stating that Carracci painted the work in Parma "for duke Ranuccio Farnese before taking it to Rome "in the duke's name" to give to cardinal Odoardo Farnese.
