= The Three Marys at the Tomb (Annibale Carraci) =

1598 painting by Annibale Carracci

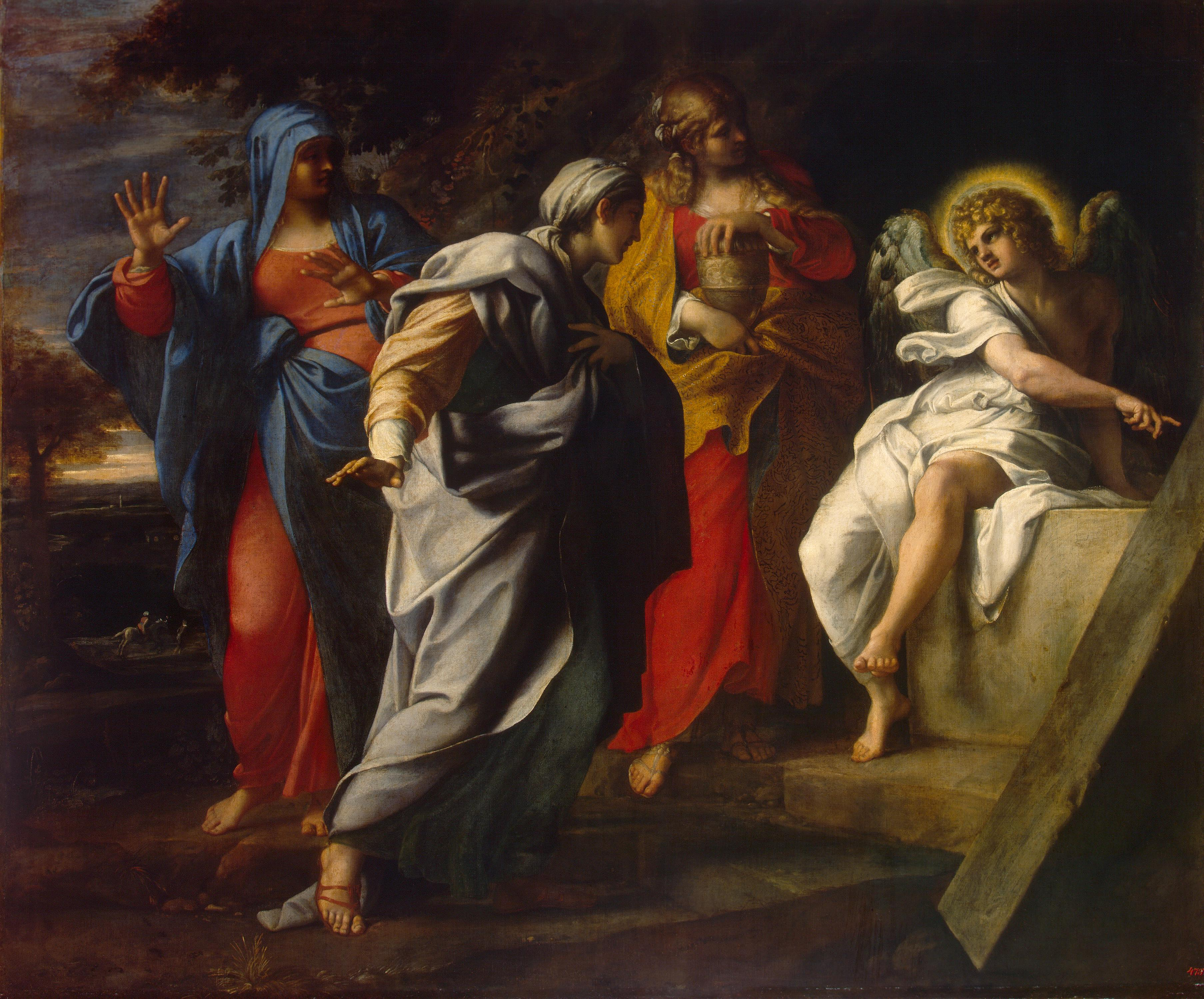
The Three Marys at the Tomb (c. 1600) by Annibale Carracci

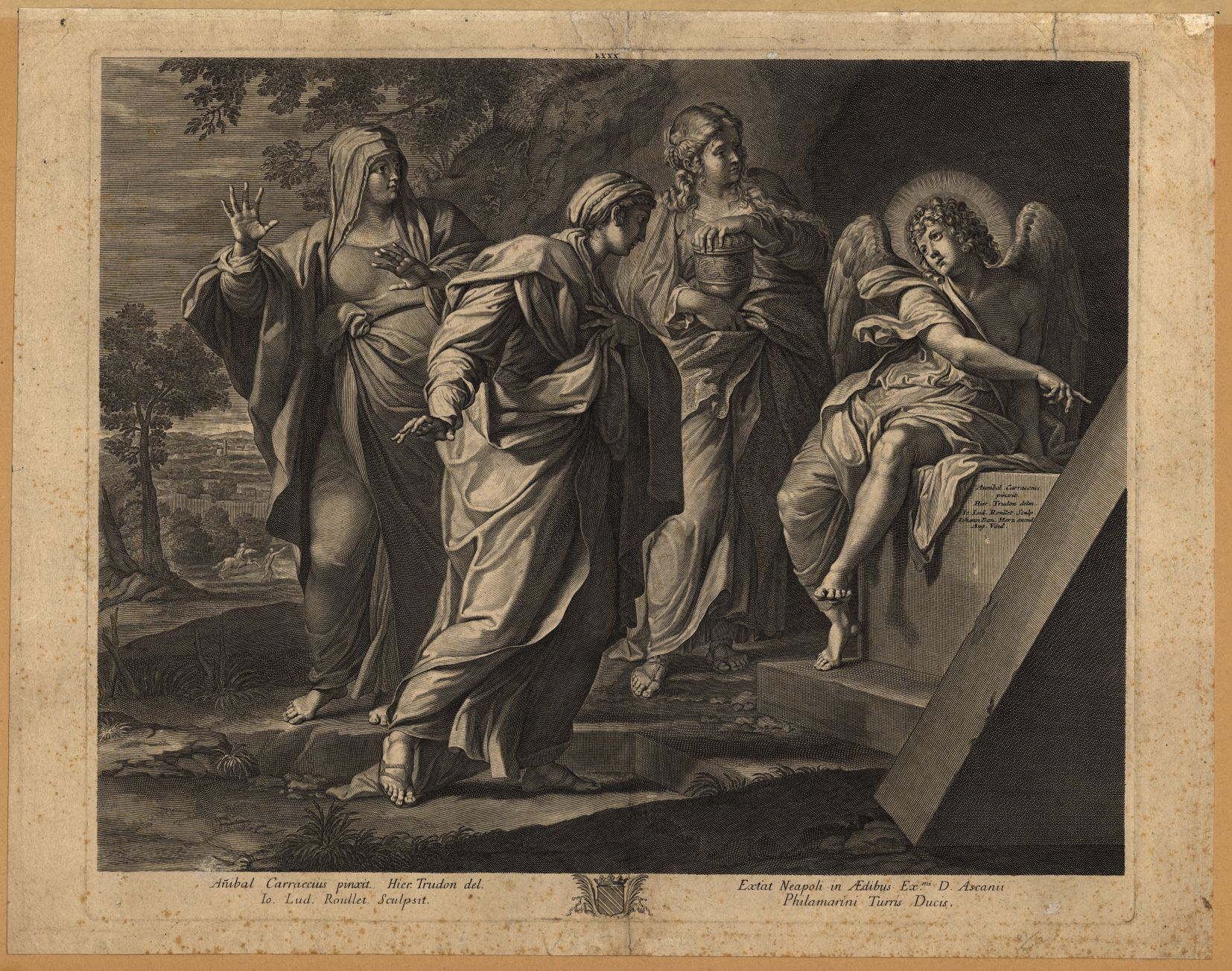
Print after the work by Jean-Louis Roullet, 1680–1695

The Three Marys at the Tomb, The Three Marys or The Pious Women at Christ's Tomb is a 1598 oil-on-canvas painting by the Italian Baroque artist Annibale Carracci, now in the Hermitage Museum in Saint Petersburg, which acquired it in 1836.

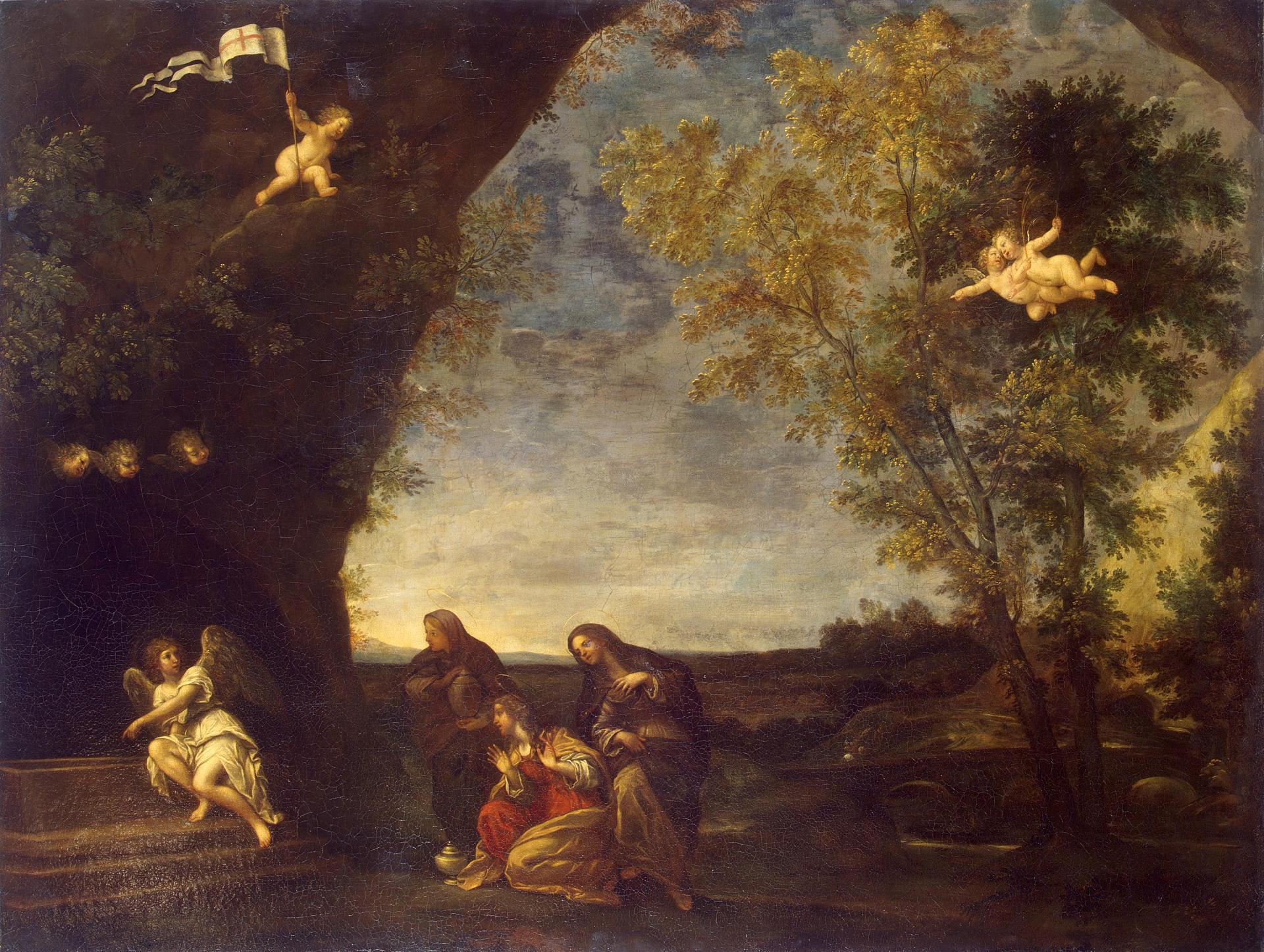
The Pious Women at the Tomb, 1604–1605, by Annibale's pupil Francesco Albani, also in the Hermitage

The painting was commissioned by Lelio Pasqualini (1549–1611), a native of Bologna then resident in Rome, where he was a canon at Santa Maria Maggiore. Its unusual composition may be linked to Pasqualini's antiquarian interests – he owned one of the most notable collections of the time. It is one of the best examples of Annibale's synthesis of the artists then active in Rome, as also seen in The Loves of the Gods frescoes around 1600 In this work we specifically see the influence of classical sculpture and Raphael, particularly the latter's cartoons for the Vatican tapestries. It is typical of Annibale's style in Rome but still linked to his early style – Mary Magdalene's red and gold dress is almost identical to Good Fortune or Happiness in his Allegory of Truth and Time (Hampton Court), painted about fifteen years earlier

In his 1678 Felsina Pittrice, Carlo Cesare Malvasia wrote that in Naples he had seen "at the home of Lord Duke della Torre, nephew of Lord Cardinal Filomarino, Archbishop of that City, the famous painting commonly called 'The Three Marys'; that is, the same one also known as the most gracious Angel in vestments at the monument, an unmatched painting, made by Annibale for his beloved countryman, the antiquarian Pasqualini, from whom it passed by inheritance to Monsig. Agucchi and after the death of the Prelate and Nuncio of Venice to the aforementioned Lord Cardinal, who three times refused an offer from the King of England to exchange it for three chamber tapestries". The dukes later sold the work and it passed through several collections, including that of Lucien Bonaparte, before reaching its present owner.
