= The Martyrdom of St Stephen (Annibale Carracci) =

Painting by Annibale Carracci (Louvre, INV 204)

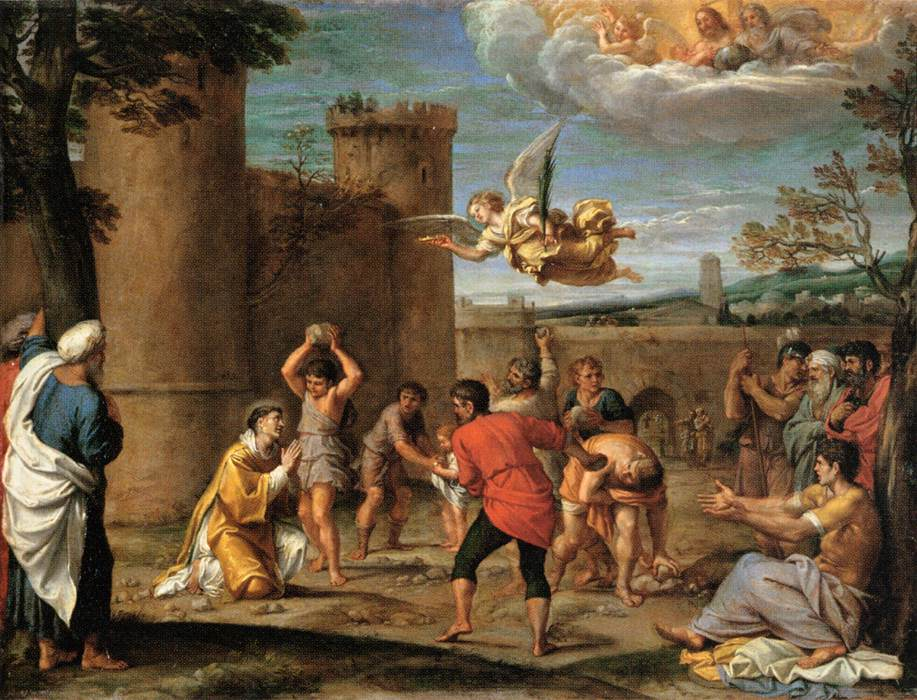
- Artist: Annibale Carracci
- Year: 1603
- Medium: Oil on canvas
- Movement: Italian Baroque
- Subject: The stoning of Saint Stephen
- Location: Louvre, Paris
- Coordinates: 48.8600°N 2.3333°E
- Owner: Louis XIV
- Accession: INV. 204

The Martyrdom of St Stephen is an oil painting on canvas executed c.1603–1604 by the Italian painter Annibale Carracci. It was given to Louis XIV by the duc de Montausier sometime before 1668 and is now in the Louvre in Paris (INV. 204). It is drawn on by a c.1610 work on the subject possibly by the artist's nephew Antonio Carracci (National Gallery, London).
