= Self-Portrait (Annibale Carracci) =

Painting by Annibale Carracci

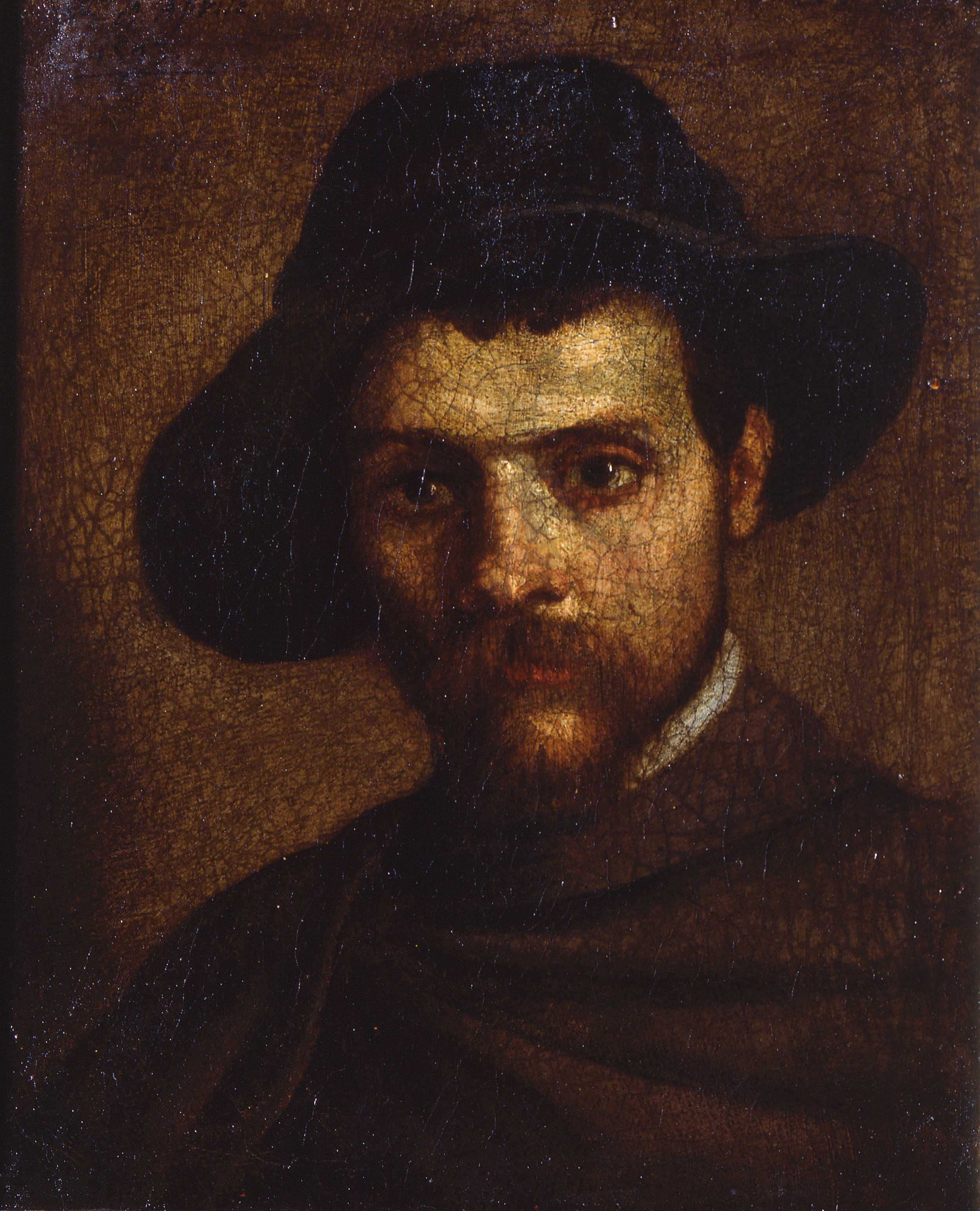
- Artist: Annibale Carracci
- Year: 1593
- Dimensions: 24 cm × 20 cm (9.4 in × 7.9 in)
- Location: Galleria nazionale di Parma, Parma

Self-Portrait is a 1593 oil on canvas painting by the Italian Baroque painter Annibale Carracci, now in the Galleria Nazionale di Parma. It is dated 17 April 1593 on the top left of the canvas.

== History ==
Based on the signed date of the painting, Carracci would have been 33 years old. That time was the period of his greatest artistic success: Carracci had just completed Story of the Foundation of Rome with his cousin Ludovico Carracci for the Palazzo Magnani in Bologna.

The painting entered the Galleria Nazionale di Parma after its acquisition by Margherita Dall'Aglio, widow of Bodoni, in December 1841. Quintavalle interpreted the written date of the portrait's completion as "4 di Aprile 1593." Later, that interpretation was corrected by art historian Posner as "17 di Aprile 1593."

The painting has always been titled as a self-portrait, based on oral tradition. As reported by Anna Ottavi Cavina, there are a number of 17th-century Carracci prints and drawings that depict his practice of self-portraiture.

== Description ==
Annibale Carracci is depicted as a half bust, close-up, with a wide-brimmed felt hat and wearing a dark tabard. The composition is cropped to concentrate attention on his face: his short hair, intense gaze, and the confident expression emerge from a neutral background. Studies have compared this self-portrait with that of Annibale's brother Agostino Carracci, now at the Uffizi, and how their self-portraits show the different characters of the two artists. The Annibale's self-portrait is "contemptuous of all exterior decoration, with enough to go around ... not very clean ... with a coat messily wrapped", while the Agostino's depicts an intellectual with refined features, a musician, and a poet.

== Bibliography ==
- Boschloo A.W.A., Annibale Carracci in Bologna, Visible Reality in Art after the Council of Trent, Kunsthistorische Studien van het Nederlands Instituut te Rome, The Hague, 1974.
- (in Italian) Angela Ghilardi, Scheda dell'opera; in Lucia Fornari Schianchi (a cura di) Galleria Nazionale di Parma. Catalogo delle opere, il Cinquecento, Milano, 1998.
- (in Italian) Cesare Malvasia, Felsina pittrice. Vite de'pittori bolognesi, Bologna, 1678.
- (in Italian) Anna Ottavi Cavina, Annibale Carracci e la lupa del fregio Magnani, in Les Carraches et les décors profanes, Roma, 1988.
- Posner D., Annibale Carracci, London, 1971.
- (in Italian) Corrado Ricci, La Regia Galleria di Parma, Parma, 1896.
- (in Italian) Fornari Schianchi, Come si forma un museo: il caso della Galleria Nazionale di Parma; in Fornari Schianchi (ed.), Galleria Nazionale di Parma. Catalogo delle opere dall'Antico al Cinquecento, Milano, 1997.
