= The Birth of the Virgin (Annibale Carracci) =

Painting by Annibale Carracci

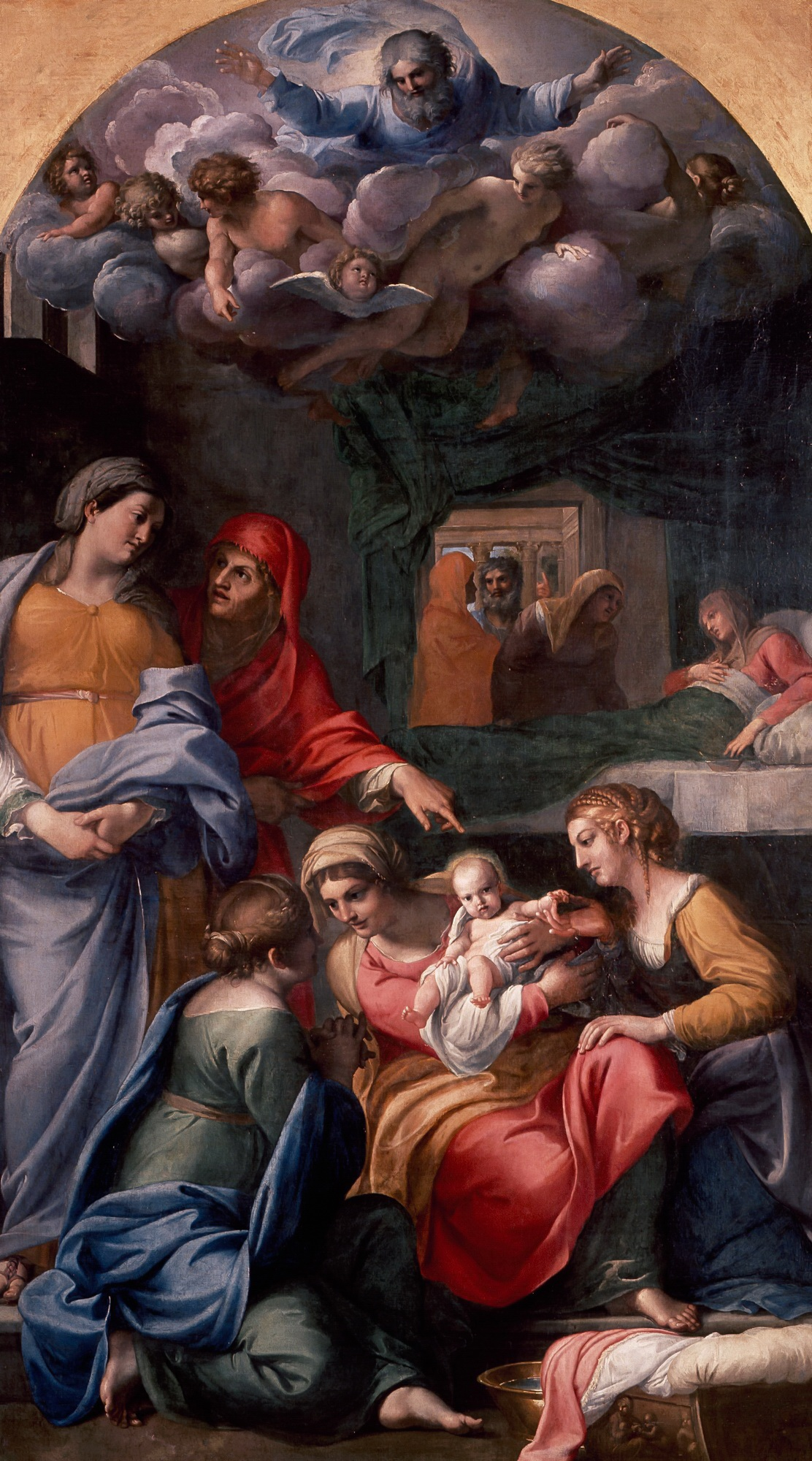
- Artist: Annibale Carracci
- Year: c. 1605–1609
- Medium: Oil on canvas
- Dimensions: 274 cm × 155 cm (108 in × 61 in)
- Location: Louvre, Paris

The Birth of the Virgin is an oil painting on canvas by the Italian Baroque painter Annibale Carracci, commissioned by Cesare d'Este in 1605 but still incomplete in the artist's studio upon his death in 1609. It hung in one of the chapels in the Loreto Basilica from 1628 to 1633. The painting was looted by Napoleon's troops in 1797 and entered the Louvre the following year, in whose collection it remains.
