= List of art looted by Napoleonic armies =

== Unreturned artworks ==
=== Modena ===
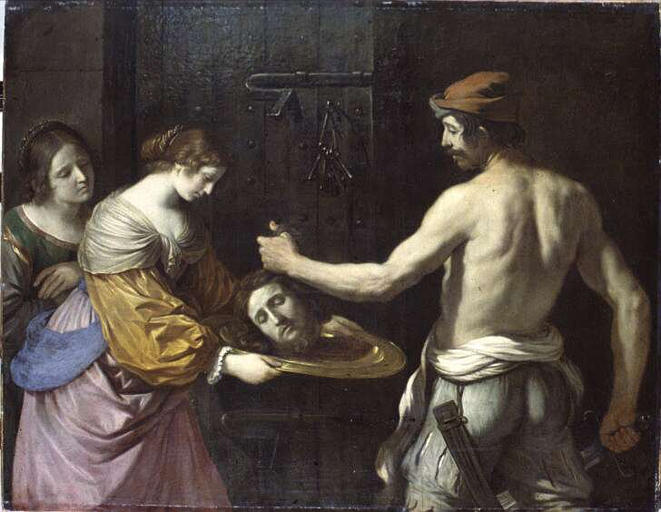
Salome Receiving The Head of Saint John, Guercino

- Salome Receiving The Head of Saint John by Guercino, Musée des Beaux Arts, Rennes
- The Martyring of Saint Peter and Saint Paul by Francesco Camullo and Ludovico Carracci, Musée des Beaux Arts, Rennes
- Jesus Lamented by the Virgin by Guercino, Musée des Beaux Arts, Rennes
- The Vision by Guercino, Musée des Beaux Arts, Rennes
- The dream of Jacob of Cigoli, Nancy, Musée des Beaux Arts
- The Madonna with the Baby Jesus Giving Benediction by Guercino, Chambéry Musée d'Art et d'Histoire
- The Madonna and the Baby Jesus and the Martyring of Saint Paul by Guercino, Toulouse, Musée des Augustines
- The Glory of All-Saints by Guercino, Toulouse, Musée des Augustines
- Saint Sebastian Tended by Irene by Francesco Cairo, Tours, Musée des Beaux Arts
- Saint Francis of Assisi Receiving the Stigmata by Guercino, Magonza, Mittelrehinschers Landesmuseum
- The Holy Family Contemplating the Baby Jesus Sleeping by Francesco Gessi, Clermont-Ferrand, Musée des Beaux-Arts
- The Martyrdom of Saint Victoria by Giovanni Antonio Burrini, Compiègne, Musée National du Chateau
- The Martyrdom of Saint Christopher by Leonello Spada, Epernay, Notre Dame
- Joseph and His Wife of Putifarre by Leonello Spada, Lille, Musée des Beaux Arts
- Rinaldo and Armida by Alessandro Tiarini, Lille, Palais des Beaux Arts
- Saint Bernard of Siena Saving Carpi from an Enemy Army by Ludovico Carracci, Notre Dame Cathedral
- Christ and the Adulteress by Giuseppe Porta, now at the Bordeaux Musee des Beaux-Arts
- 1,300 drawings from the Gallerie Estensi, now at the Bibliothéque Nationale of Paris

=== Mantua ===
- Transfiguration of Christ by Rubens, Museum of Nancy
- The Baptism of Christ by Rubens, made for the Church of the Jesuit Trinity of Mantua, now at the Royal Museum of Fine Arts Antwerp of Antwerp

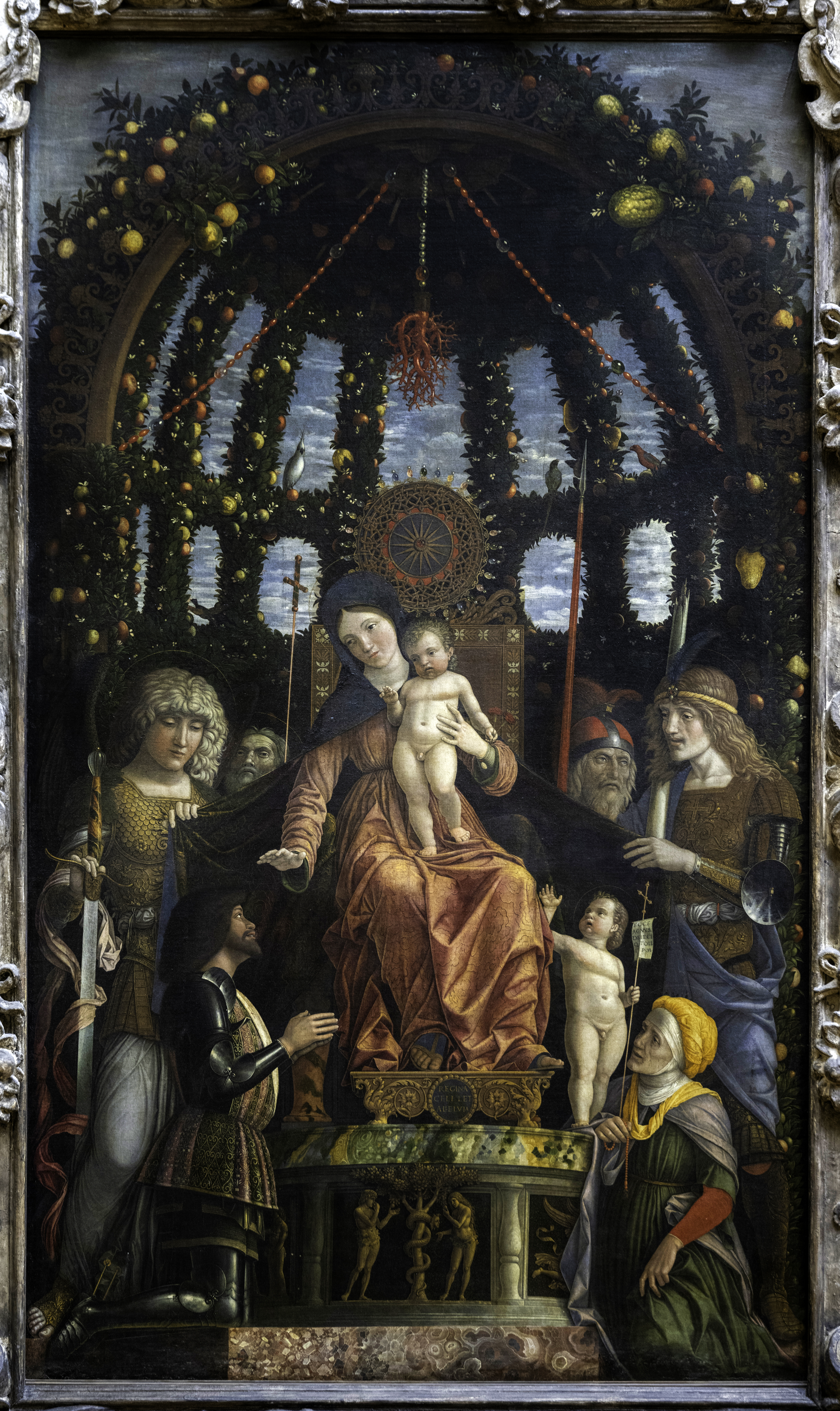
Madonna della Vittoria, Mantegna

- Madonna della Vittoria by Andrea Mantegna, from Mantua's church of Santa Maria della Vittoria, now at the Louvre
- Adoration of the Shepherds with Saint Longino and Saint John the Evangelist by Giulio Romano, from the Basilica of San Andrea of Mantua, now at the Louvre
- Saint Anthony Tempted by the Devil by Paolo Veronese, from Mantua Cathedral, now at the museum of Caen

=== Lombardy ===
- The Preaching at Jerusalem by Carpaccio, from the Pinacoteca di Brera in Lombardy, now at the Musee du Louvre
- The Virgin Casio by Boltraffio, from the Pinacoteca di Brera in Lombardy, now at the Musee du Louvre
- Saint Bernard and Saint Louis by Moretto da Brescia, from the Pinacoteca di Brera in Lombardy, now at the Musee du Louvre
- Saint Bonaventue and Saint Anthony of Padua by Moretto da Brescia, from the Pinacoteca di Brera in Lombardy, now at the Musee du Louvre
- Sacred Family with Elizabeth, Joachim, and John the Baptist by Marco d'Oggiono, from the Pinacoteca di Brera in Lombardy, now at the Musee du Louvre
- Annunciation Triptych by Rogier van der Weyden, central panel at the Musee du Louvre, side compartments at the Galleria Sabauda
- The Dropsy, by Gerard Dou, Musee du Louvre
- The Adoration of the Magi by Defendente Ferrari, now at the Malibu Getty Museum
- Madonna in Glory by Defendente Ferrari, lost
- Virgin with Jesus and Saint John the Baptist by Lorenzo Sabatini, Musee du Louvre

=== Tuscany ===
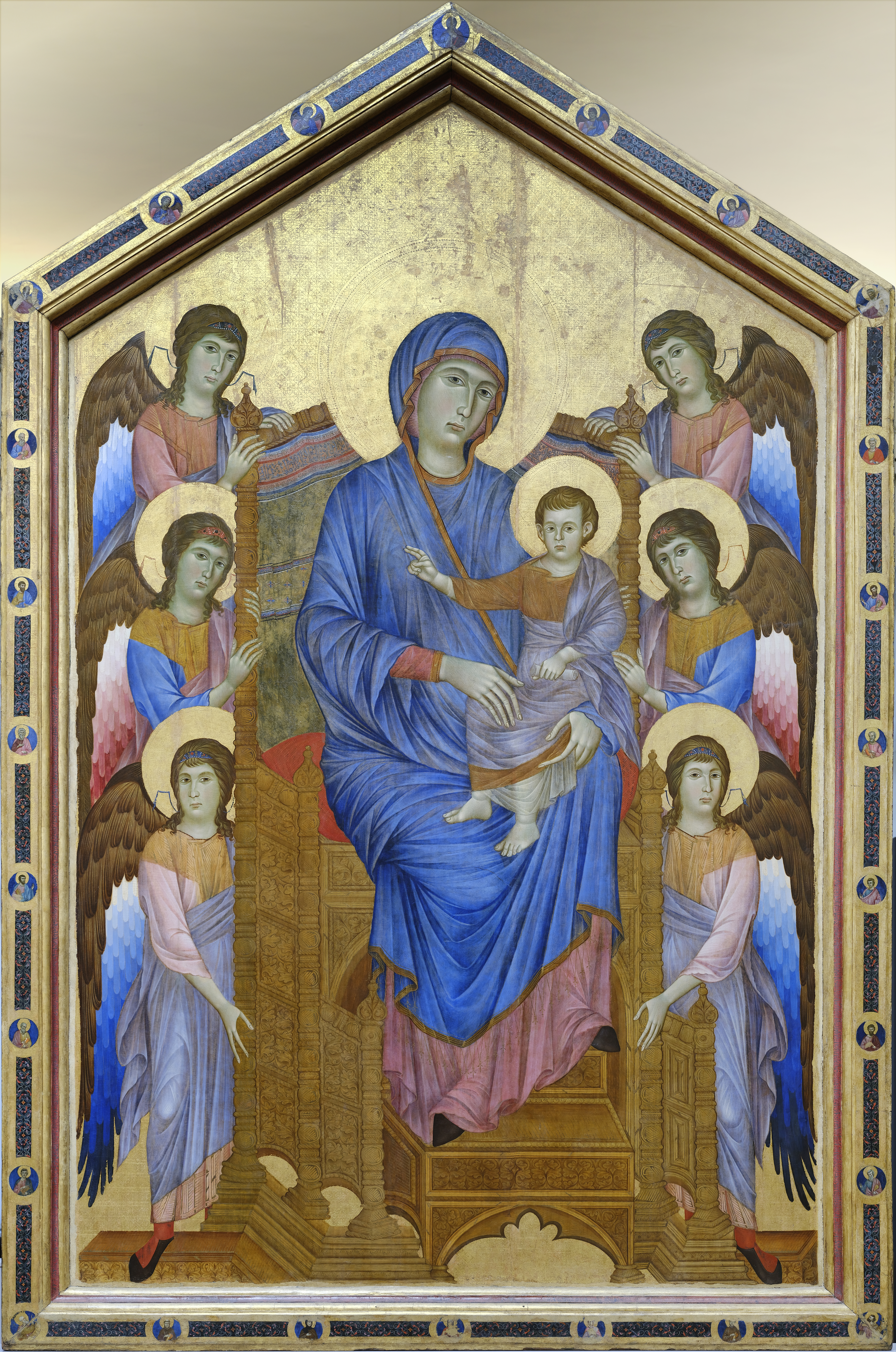
Maestà, Cimbaue, c. 1280, Louvre

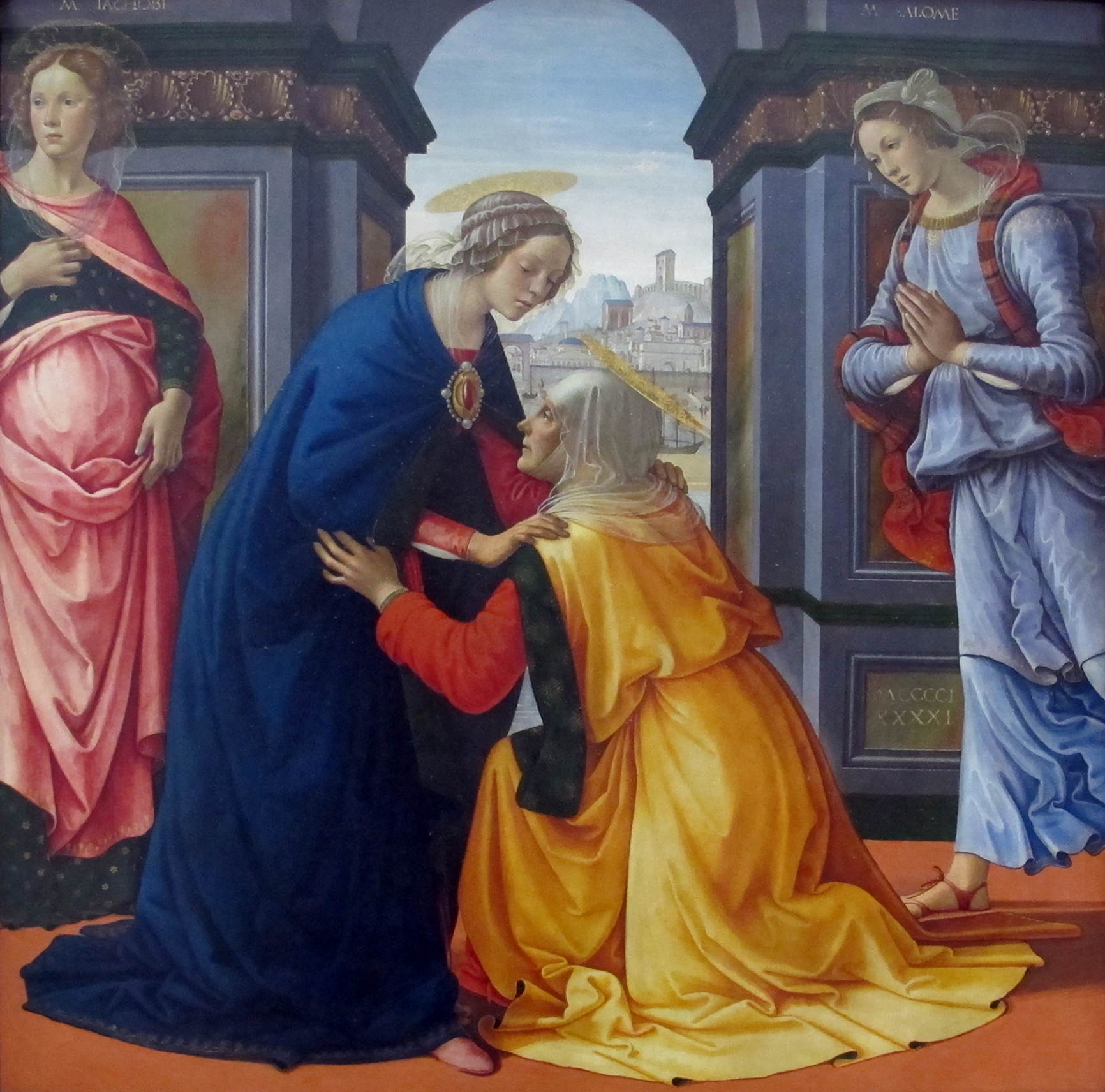
The Visitation, Domenico Ghirlandaio

==== Fiesole ====
- Coronation of the Virgin by Beato Angelico taken from the Convent of San Domenico in Fiesole, now at the Louvre
- Virgin with Child and Saint Dominic and Thomas Aquinas, by Beato Angelico, taken from the Convent of San Domenico in Fiesole, Hermitage Museum
- Crucifixion with the Torments and Saint Dominic, by Beato Angelico, taken from the Convent of San Domenico in Fiesole, Musee du Louvre

==== Florence ====
- The Virgin, Jesus, and Saint Bernard by Cosimo Rosselli, from Florence
- The Virgin, Jesus, Saint Giuliano, and Saint Niccolo by Lorenzo di Credi, from Florence
- Virgin Embracing the Child, with Saint and Angels by Empoli, from Accademia delle Belle Arti di Firenze in Florence
- Saint John the Baptist and Two monks by Andrea del Castagno, from Accademia delle Belle Arti di Firenze in Florence
- The Virgin with Baby Jesus and Four Angels by Sandro Botticelli, from Accademia delle Belle Arti di Firenze in Florence
- Jesus Appearing to Mary Magdalene by Angelo Bronzino, from the Santo Spirito in Florence
- Bearing the Cross by Benedetto Ghirlandaio from the Santo Spirito in Florence
- The Coronation of the Virgin and Four Saints by Raffaellino del Garbo, Florence
- Coronation of the Virgin by Piero di Cosimo, Florence
- Virgin Embracing the Child and Two Saints by Mariotto Albertinelli, Florence
- Life of Christ by Taddeo Gaddi, Florence
- Saint Francis and The Miracle of Dying by Pesello Peselli, Florence
- Coronation of the Virgin by Ridolfo Ghirlandaio, Florence
- Coronation of the Virgin and Two Angels by Simone Memmi, Florence
- The Visitation by Domenico Ghirlandaio, from the church of Santa Maria Maddalena dei Pazzi in Florence, now at the Louvre
- Virgin and Child with Saint Anne and Four Saints by Jacopo da Pontormo, from the church of Sant' Anna sul Prato of Florence, now at the Louvre
- Presentation at the Temple by Gentile da Fabriano, from the Accademia di Belle Arti di Firenze, now at the Louvre
- Barbadori Altarpiece by Fra Filippo Lippi, from the Santo Spirito of Florence, now at the Louvre

==== Pisa ====
- The Sacrifice of Abraham by Sodoma, from Pisa
- The Virgin Crowned by Jesus and Other Saints panel painting by Cenobio Machiavelli, from the Convent of Santa Croce in Fossabanda in Pisa
- Virgin and Child sculpture by Giovanni Pisano, from Pisa
- The Death of Saint Bernard by Orcagna, from Pisa
- Saint Benedict by Andrea del Castagno, from Pisa
- Saint Francis Receiving the Stigmata by Giotto, originally from the Pisan church of Saint Francis, now at the Louvre
- Maesta by Cimabue, originally in the Pisan church of Saint Francis, now at the Louvre
- Holy Mary with Her Divine Son Amid the Angels by Turino Vanni, from the Convent of San Silvestro in Pisa, now at the Louvre
- Saint Thomas Aquinas with the Doctors of the Church by Benozzo Gozzoli, from the Duomo of Pisa, now at the Louvre
- Holy Mary with Her Divine Son by Taddeo di Bartolo, from the San Paolo all'Orto, now at Musee du Grenoble

=== Parma, Piacenza, and Guastalla ===
- The Immaculate Conception with St. Anselm and St. Martin (Wikidata Q18573638) by Giuseppe Maria Crespi, from Parma
- Madonna with Child Enthroned with Saint John the Baptist and Mary Magdalene by Cima da Conegliano, now at the Louvre

=== Naples ===
- The Adoration of the Magi by Spagnoletto, Musee du Louvre
- The Sacred Family by Bartolomeo Schedoni, Musee du Louvre
- The Virgin with the Baby Jesus by Cimabue, Museum of Lille
- Saint Luke and the Virgin by Giordano, Musee de Lyon
- Death of Sofonisba by Calabrese, Musee de Lyon
- The Visitation by Sabbatini, Montpellier
- Venus and Adonis by Vaccaro, Musee d'Aix-en-Provence
- Madonna of the Dove by Piero di Cosimo, now at the Louvre

=== Rome and the Papal State ===
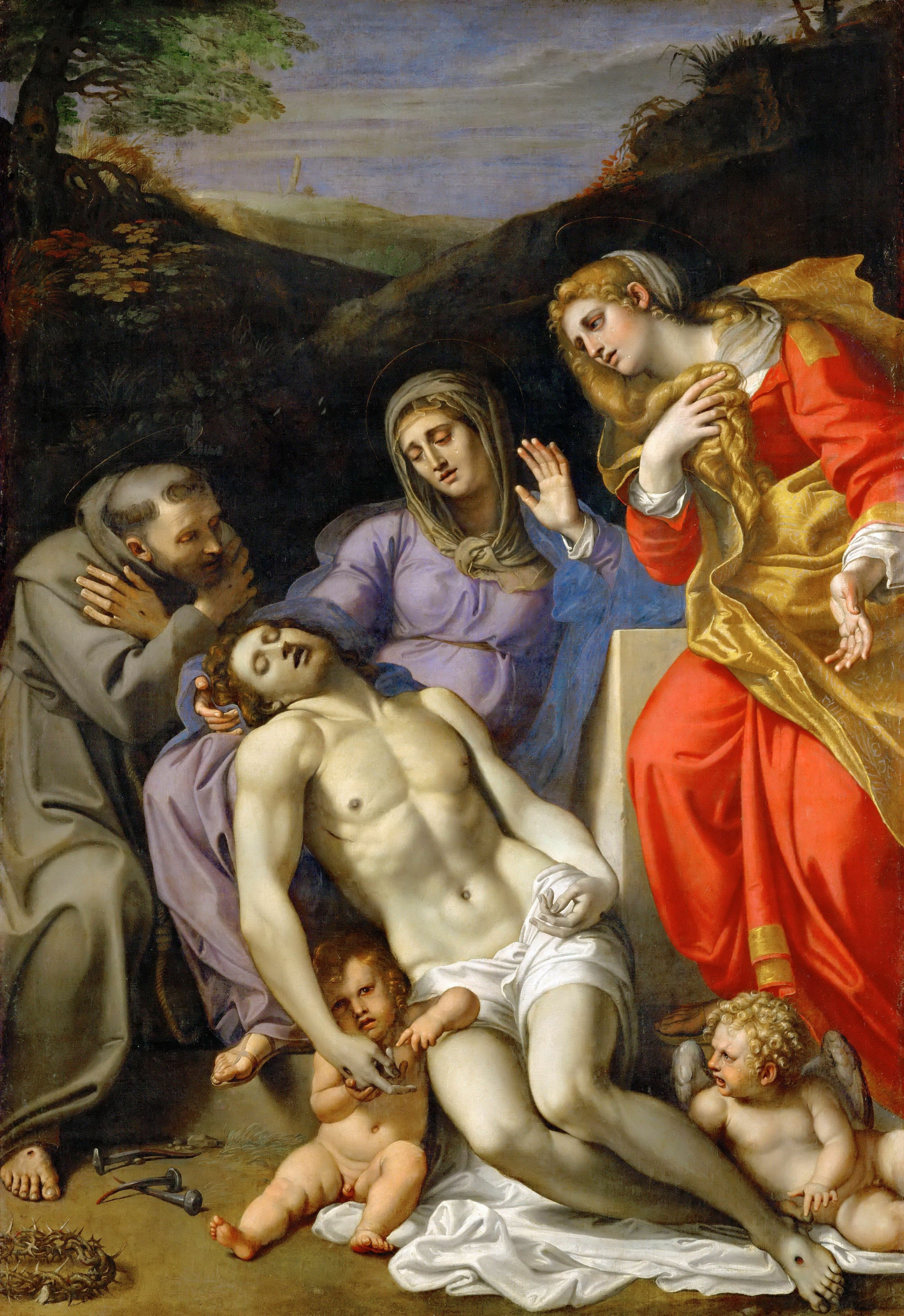
Pietà with Saint Francis and Saint Mary Magdalene, Annibale Carracci

- Equestrian Portrait of the Spanish Ambassador by Van Dyck, from the Palazzo Braschi, Musee du Louvre
- Seated Man at the Foot of a Tree by Viruly, from the Palazzo Braschi, Musee du Louvre
- The Usurers Thrown Out of the Temple by Braschi, from the Palazzo Braschi, Musee du Louvre
- The Virgin, Jesus, and Saint John the Baptist by Giulio Romano, from the Palazzo Braschi, Musee du Louvre
- Saint Francis by Albani, from the Palazzo Braschi, Musee du Louvre
- Virgin and Jesus by Fasolo, from the Palazzo Braschi, Musee du Louvre
- The Virgin of Loreto, copy of Raphael, from the Palazzo Braschi, Musee du Louvre
- Dinner of Emmaus by Bernardo Strozzi, from the Palazzo Braschi, Musee de Grenoble
- Saint Sebastian by Orbetto, from the Palazzo Braschi, Musee de Bordeaux
- Pietà with Saint Francis and Saint Mary Magdalene by Annibale Carracci, from the church of Saint Francis of Ripa, Musee du Louvre
- Salvator Mundi by Carlo Dolci, from the Villa Albani, Musee du Louvre
- Virgin and Jesus by Fasolo, from the Villa Albani, Musee du Louvre
- Virgin and Jesus by Vannucci, from the Villa Albani, Musee du Louvre
- Resurrection of Lazarus by Bonifacio Veronese, Musee du Louvre

==== Umbria ====
- Marriage of the Virgin by Perugino, Caen, now at the Musee des Beaux-Arts
- San Pietro Polyptych by Perugino, now at the Lione Musee des Beaux-Arts

=== Veneto and Venezia ===
- The Wedding at Cana of Veronese, taken from a Benedictine refectory in Venice, now at the Louvre
- Agony in the Garden by Andrea Mantegna, originally in Verona's San Zeno, now at the Tours' Musee des Beaux-Arts
- Resurrection by Andrea Mantegna, from Verona, now at the Tours' Musee des Beaux-Arts
- The Crucifixion of Andrea Mantegna, originally from Verona's San Zeno, now at the Louvre

=== Other locations ===
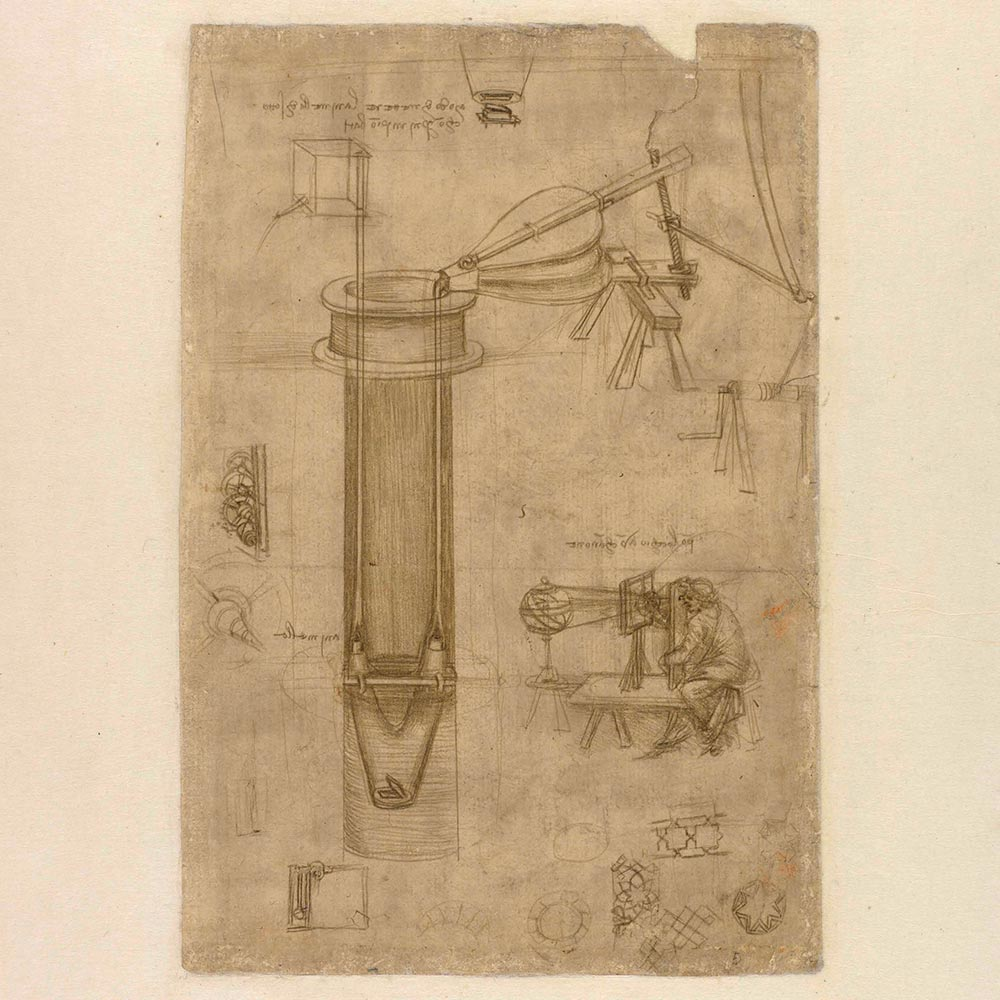
Diagram from da Vinci's Codex Atlanticus

- The Codex Atlanticus of Leonardo da Vinci, 44 folios, and 196 other ancillary drawings, originally stored at the Biblioteca Ambrosiana, now stored at the Bibliotheque Nationale in Paris and the Musee des Beaux-Arts, Nantes
- The Nativity by Filippo Lippo, from the convent of Santa Margherita of Prato, now at the Louvre
- Christ Adored by the Angels, with Saint Bernard and Saint Sebastian by Carlo Bononi, now at the Louvre
- The Virgin Appearing to Saint Catherine and Saint Luke by Annibale Carracci, commissioned for the Cathedral of Reggio Emilia, now at the Louvre
- The Purification of the Virgin by Guido Reni, now at the Louvre
- The Return of the Prodigal Son by Leonello Spada, now at the Louvre
- The Patron Saints of the City of Modena by Guercino, now at the Louvre
- Saint Paul by Guercino, now at the Louvre
- The Triumph of Job by Guido Reni
- Christ Mocked and Crowned with Thorns by Giambologna, now at the Bordeaux Musee des Beaux-Arts
- The Madonna with the Baby Jesus Giving Benediction by Guercino, now at the Chambéry Musée d'Art et d'Histoire
- The Holy Family Contemplating the Baby Jesus Sleeping by Francesco Gessi, now at the Clérmond-Ferrand Musée des Beaux-Arts
- The Martyrdom of Saint Victoria by Giovanni Antonio Burrini, now at the Compiégne Musée National du Chateau
- Joseph and The Wife of Putifarre by Leonello Spada, Lille Musee des Beaux Arts
- Rinaldo Prevents Armada from Killing Herself by Alessandro Tiarini, Lille Musee des Beaux Arts
- Saint Bernard of Siena Saves Carpi from an Enemy Army by Ludovico Carracci, Notre-Dame de Paris

=== Spain ===
- The Birth of the Virgin by Murillo, from Seville Cathedral, now at the Louvre
- Philip IV in Brown and Silver by Velázquez, from El Escorial, now at the National Gallery, London
- Arnolfini Portrait by Jan van Eyck, from the Royal Palace of Madrid, now at the National Gallery, London
- Madonna della tenda by Raphael, from El Escorial, now at the Alte Pinakothek, Munich

== Repatriated artworks ==
=== Italy ===
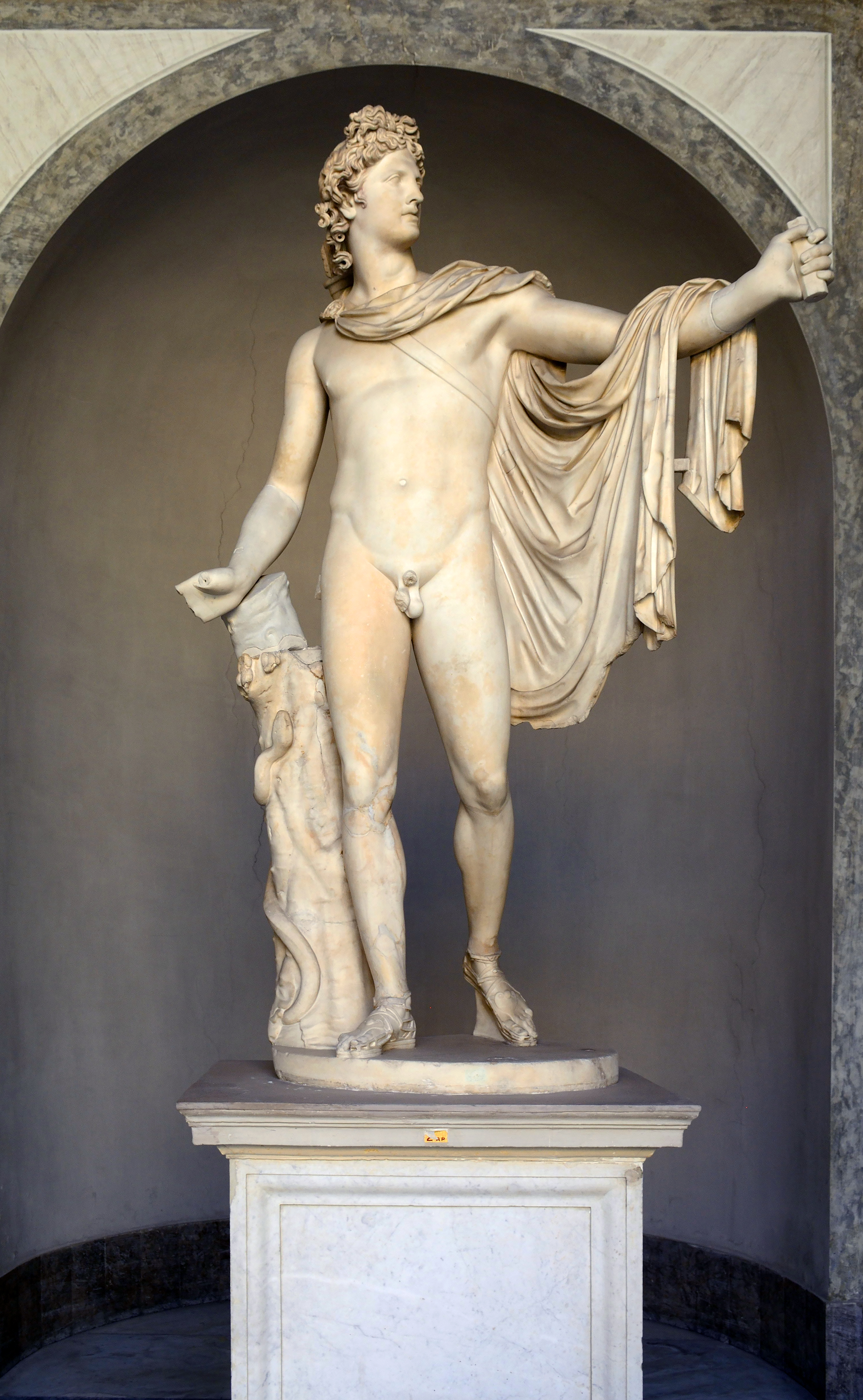
Apollo Belvedere

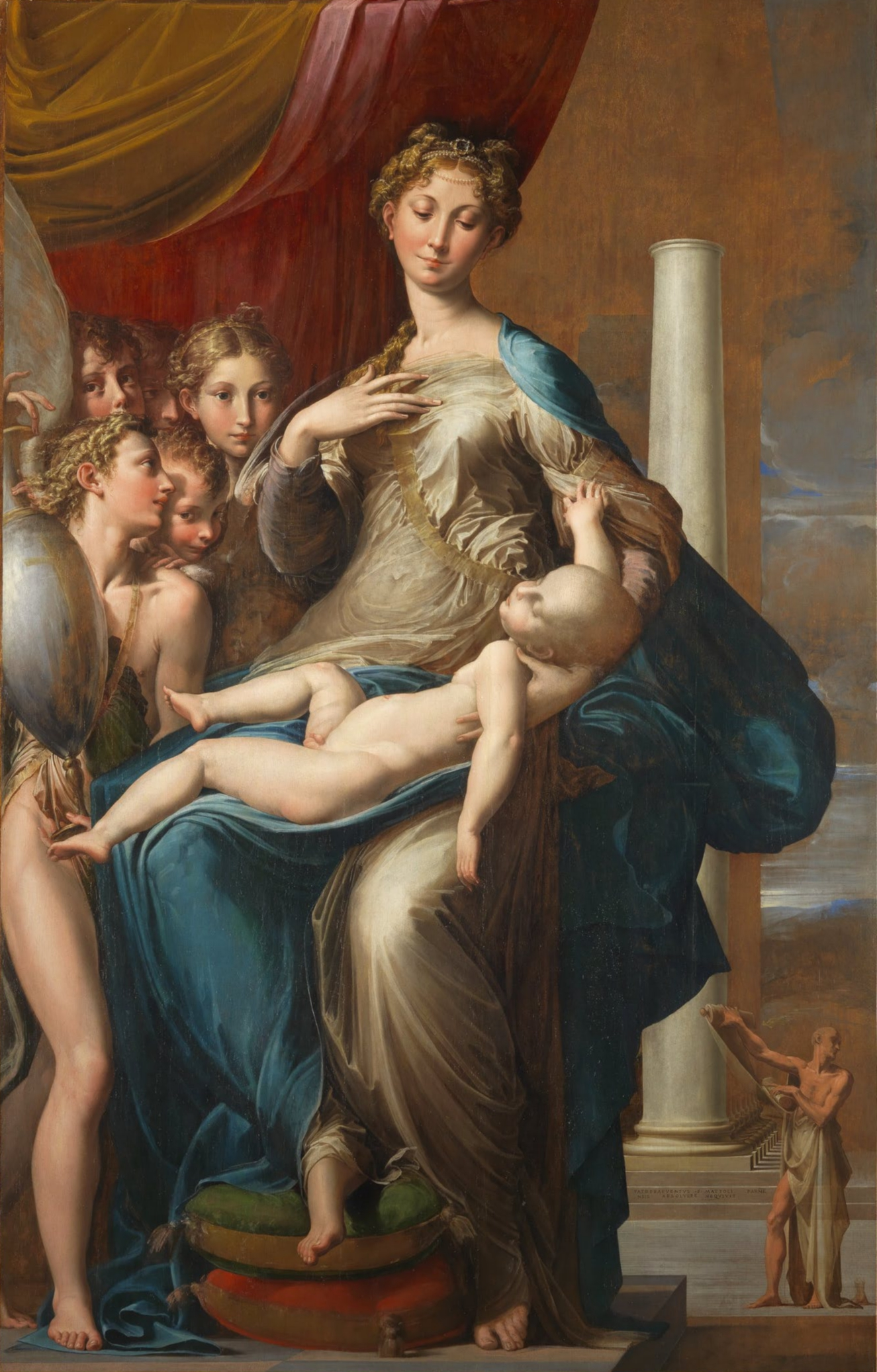
Madonna with the Long Neck, Parmigianino

- Belvedere Apollo
- Capitoline Venus
- Venus Italica
- The Laocoon group
- Head of Jove
- Horses of Saint Mark
- Venus de' Medici
- Amazzone Mattei
- The sarcophagus slab of Guidarello Guidarelli
- Transfiguration of Raphael
- Portrait of Tommaso Inghirami by Raphael
- Portrait of Leo X by Raphael
- Madonna della seggiola by Raphael
- Ecstasy of Saint Cecilia by Raphael
- Portrait of the Cardinal Bibbiena by Raphael
- Visitation by Raphael
- Assumption of the Virgin
- Saint John the Baptist with the Saints Francesco Giralamo, Sebastian, and Anthony of Padua by Perugino
- Crucifixion of Saint Peter by Guido Reni
- Massacre of the Innocents by Guido Reni
- Fortune with a Crown by Guido Reni
- Madonna with the Long Neck by Parmigianino
- Lamentation over the Dead Christ by Correggio
- The Cathedral of Saint Peter by Guercino
- Marriage of the Virgin by Giulio Cesare Procaccini
- Madonna with Child and the Saints Luigi Gonzaga and Stanislao Kostka by Giuseppe Maria Crespi
- Marie al sepolcro by Bartolomeo Schedoni
- Ecce Homo by Ludovico Cigoli
- Bringing Christ to the Tomb by Cavalier D'Arpino
- Lamentation of the Dead Christ with the Saints Francis, Claire, John the Evangelist, Marie Magdalene, and Angels by Annibale Carracci
- Mars and Venus by Antonio Canova
- Madonna with Child and Saint Christopher and Saint George by Defendente Ferrari, returned to the Caselle Torinese
- Young Dutch Woman at a Window by Gerard Dou, returned to the Galleria Sabauda
- Deposition from the Cross by Federico Barocci

=== Austrian Empire ===
- The Peasant and the Nest Robber by Peter Brueghel the Elder
- The Peasant Dance by Brueghel the Elder
- Triptych of Saint Sebastian by Christoph Amberger
- Charity by Hans Baldung

=== Spain ===
- Immaculate Conception by Murillo. Taken in 1813 and exchanged in 1941 for Velázquez's Portrait of Mariana of Austria

=== Others nations ===
- The Battle of Alexander by Albrecht Altdorfer, Monaco
- The Last Judgement by Hans Memling, Danzig (Gdansk)
