= Resurrection (Mantegna, Tours) =

15th-century painting by Andrea Mantegna

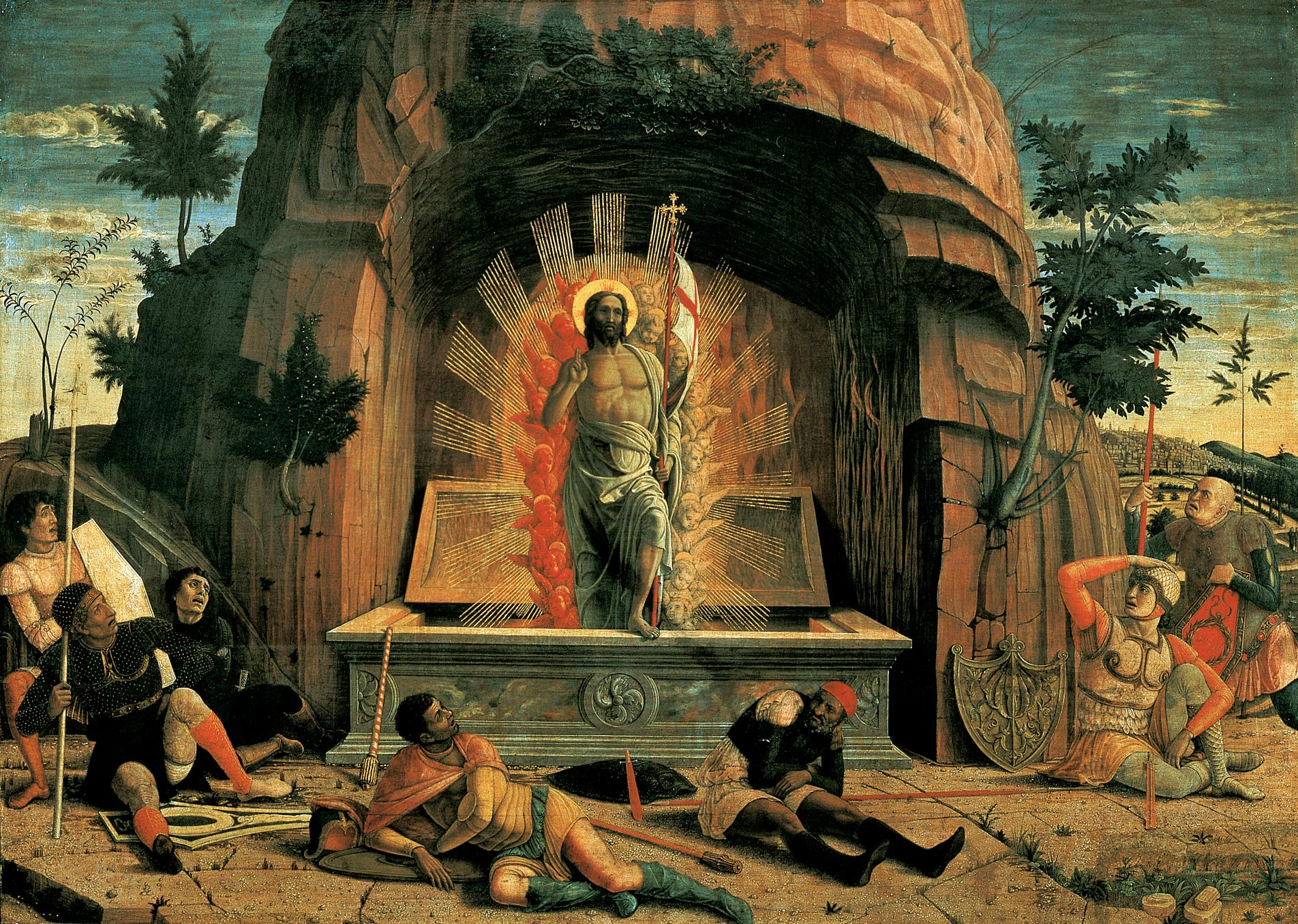
- Artist: Andrea Mantegna
- Year: 1457–59
- Medium: tempera on panel
- Dimensions: 70 cm × 92 cm (28 in × 36 in)
- Location: Musée des Beaux-Arts de Tours, Tours

Resurrection is a tempera on panel painting by Andrea Mantegna dating from 1457–59, now in the Musée des Beaux-Arts in Tours.

Like Agony in the Garden (also Tours) and Crucifixion (Louvre), it originally formed part of the predella of the San Zeno Altarpiece, commissioned in 1457. It was produced in Padua and then sent to Verona in 1459. In 1797 the altarpiece was confiscated by the French occupying authorities and sent to the 'Museo Napoleone' in Paris, an augmented version of the Louvre. The three main panels and the cornice were returned in 1815 after Napoleon's final defeat, but the predella remained in France. A modern copy of the predella is now on show under the main panels.

== Bibliography ==
- (in Italian) Ettore Camesasca, Mantegna, in AA.VV., Pittori del Rinascimento, Scala, Firenze 2007. ISBN 888117099X
