= Castellini =

Castellini is an Italian surname. Notable people with the surname include:

- Antonio Castellini (1951–1976), Italian boxer
- Bob Castellini (born 1941), American businessman
- Caterina Amigoni Castellini (18th century), Italian pastellist living in Spain
- Claudio Castellini (born 1966), Italian comics artist
- Giacomo Castellini (fl. 1678), Italian Baroque painter
- Gianluca Castellini (died 1510), Roman Catholic Bishop of Catanzaro
- Jean Castellini (born 1968), Monegasque businessman and civil servant
- Julien Castellini (born 1975), Monegasque alpine skier
- Luca Castellini or Lucas Castellini (died 1631), Roman Catholic prelate
- Luciano Castellini (born 1945), Italian footballer and manager
- Marcello Castellini (born 1973), Italian footballer
- Miguel Angel Castellini (1947–2020), Argentine boxer
- Paolo Castellini (born 1979), Italian footballer
- Raffaelle Castellini (died 1864), Italian artist
