= San Zeno Altarpiece (Mantegna) =

Triptych by Andrea Mantegna

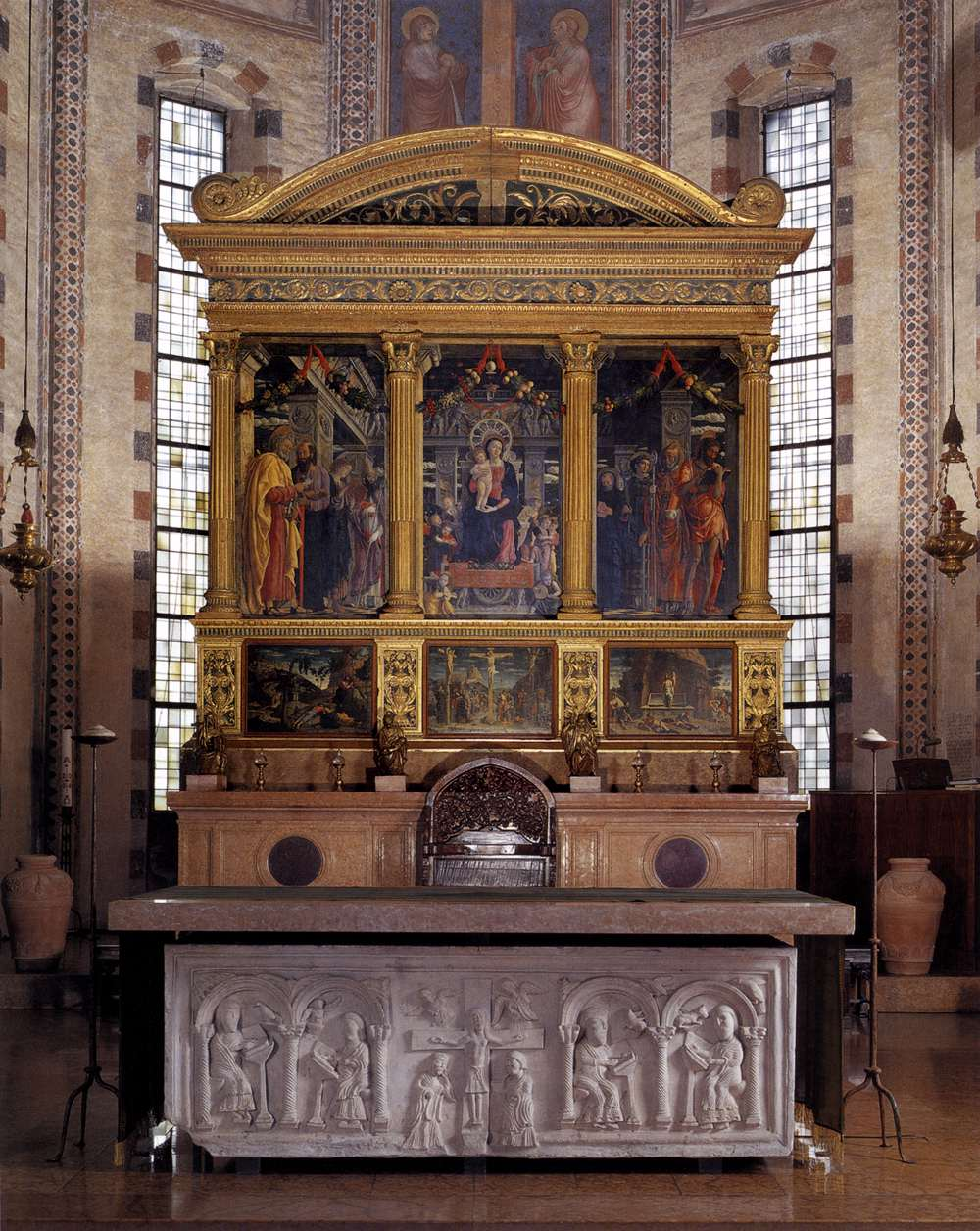
- Artist: Andrea Mantegna
- Year: c. 1456–1459
- Medium: Tempera on panel
- Dimensions: 212 cm × 460 cm (83 in × 180 in)
- Location: Basilica di San Zeno, Verona

The San Zeno Altarpiece is a polyptych altarpiece by the Italian Renaissance painter Andrea Mantegna created around 1456–1459. It remains in situ in the Basilica di San Zeno, the main church of the Northern Italian city of Verona. Mantegna's style mixes Greco-Roman classical themes along with Christian subjects in this altarpiece. The central panel, along with the three paintings that comprise the predella, were taken in 1797 by the French. While the main, central scene was returned by the French to Verona in 1815, the three predella paintings in Verona today are copies, since the original ones remain in France at the Louvre (Crucifixion) and in the Musée des Beaux-Arts in Tours (Resurrection and Agony in the Garden). The paintings are made with tempera on panel; not oil as mistakenly identified in one source.

== Patron and commission ==
The San Zeno Altarpiece was commissioned around 1456 to 1459 by Gregorio Correr, a Venetian nobleman, humanist scholar, and administrator for and abbot of the Church of San Zeno. The San Zeno altarpiece was commissioned and made to depict a heavenly realm. This was intended so the viewers would aspire for a position in the "court of heaven" in communion with the religious figures portrayed in the altarpiece. Furthermore, St. Zeno the patron saint of Verona, is believed to have introduced Christianity to Verona, therefore this altarpiece is named in his honor. After his work on the San Zeno Altarpiece, Mantegna finally arrived in Mantua in the year 1460 to serve as the court artist to the House of Gonzaga, the leading princely family of the city. Mantegna had actually been hired by Ludovico III Gonzaga, Marquis of Mantua, three years before, in 1457, but disagreements about Mantegna's pay and status delayed his arrival and it was during this period of postponement that he worked on the San Zeno Altarpiece.

== Style, subject and description of the altarpiece ==
The San Zeno Altarpiece is often considered to be a pictorial rendition of the artist Donatello's sculpted bronze reliefs (known as the Santo Altarpiece) made for the high altar dedicated to Sant'Antonio (c. 1446–1453) in the Basilica of Saint Anthony of Padua. While sometimes described as "lost" this work by Donatello survives but was incorrectly restored in the 19th century, thereby losing some of the artist's initial design and it has been argued by scholars that Mategna's work may better illustrate what Donatello originally intended.

Mantegna incorporated noticeably bright and rich colors of reds, blues, yellows and green that was likely a reaction to earlier critics who had negatively commented on the opaque colors in the famous frescos painted from 1454 to 1457 (destroyed in 1944) in the Ovetari Chapel. Despite seeing other artists change their color schemes he stuck to his own ideas and own techniques, which differentiated Mantegna from other Renaissance artists. The scholars Steven Zucker and Beth Harris note that the ancient, classical "past" is mostly painted in shades of grays, painted in the style of grisaille (an exception is the colorful garlands of fruit that are tied with red ribbons), while the Christian elements, show in the "present", are denoted by the use of bright, saturating colors.

The altarpiece consists of a frame, a central painting separated into three main sections, and on the bottom, a predella with three paintings that depict biblical scenes.

=== Central and side panels ===
The central section of the painting displays the Madonna and Child sitting on a marble throne, surrounded by eight saints. These eight saints are placed on the side panels that flank the central figures of the Madonna and child; this was done according to the patron's preferences: on the left are Saint Peter (in a yellow cloak holding a set of keys); Saint Paul (wearing a light purple cloak); Saint John the Evangelist (in a green cloak shown looking into a book he holds); and Saint Zeno (shown as bishop and wearing a mitre); on the right are Saint Benedict (wearing a dark blue cloak and holding a book); Saint Lawrence (wearing a dark green dalmatic); Saint Gregory (shown as a bishop wearing a mitre, a red cloak, white gloves, holding a book and crozier); and Saint John the Baptist (wearing red, reading a book, and shown in contrapposto). The subjects are shown gathered in a classical temple, adorned with pagan and mythological subjects. This painting illustrates a sacra conversazione (sacred conversation), also translated as "Holy Community". This subject originated in an Italian painting during the Trecento and refers to an assembly of saints from different periods of history, while surrounding the Madonna and child.

Mantegna's depiction of the figures, specifically that of St. John the Baptist, illustrates his use of contrapposto, as seen in the figure of Saint John the Baptist, thereby highlighting the harmony of classical and Christian iconography. The entire composition, which recalls an outdoor loggia, is full of detail referring to classical antiquity: the carved Corinthian engaged columns of the gilded frame (see below: frame) help create the allusion to a classical, pagan temple with a foreground decorated with classical garlands of foliage and fruit tied together with red ribbons. In the background of the temple is a continuous decorative frieze that include playful putti holding cornucopia overspilling with fruit. Above this frieze is a classic egg-and-dart motif that serves as a border. On the square pilasters surrounding the loggia, there are tondi (circular roundels) that illustrate mythological scenes. Likewise, the carved marble throne is reminiscent of an ancient Roman sarcophagus. Surrounding the enthroned Madonna and Child are a group of "Donatellesque" (in the style of Donatello) angels that play musical instruments, specifically the lute, or sing from song books that they hold.

=== Predella ===
On the bottom portion of the altarpiece, three paintings are displayed in the predella of the altarpiece. These paintings portray biblical scenes that occurred in Jerusalem, like the Crucifixion of Jesus and the Agony in the Garden. While the altarpiece remains in situ, the three paintings of the predella were stolen by Napoleon and have not been returned; those seen in the altarpiece today are all copies, while the originals remain in two different French museums. The image of the Crucifixion is at the Louvre Museum in Paris, while the scenes of the Resurrection and Agony in the Garden are in Tours at the Musée des Beaux-Arts. Despite being smaller components of this altarpiece, these paintings display Mantegna's attention to detail and precision as an artist in his quest to render a memorable and historical depiction of the Passion of Christ in Italian art.

=== Frame ===
The frame is carved from wood that has been gilded. Four Corinthian columns serve as engaged columns that divide the three scenes of the central panel, as well as the three scenes of the predella. The frame has been described as a portico or façade to the actual painted central scene, which is set in a pagan temple (see above: Central and side panels). The frame has a rounded pediment and entablature that recalls the architectural elements of an Ancient Greek temple. Despite the separating the scenes, the painting behind these carved Corinthian columns is continuous. In fact, if looking closely, the real carved Corinthian columns of the frame are placed directly in front of the painted square pilasters that have the Ionic order of column capitals; this superimposition blends together the carving of the frame with the painted illusionism of the pagan temple of the central scene. Stylistically, Mantegna's use of a continuous narrative that unfolded behind the carved columns and the painted square pilasters creates a unified pictorial plane. This approach was markedly different than the approach popular during the Trecento, which demarcated individual scenes by these architectural dividers and thus there was not a continuous narrative across the pictorial space. An example of this non-continuous narrative with the use of gold columns that spatially divide the scenes can be found in Giotto's Badia Polyptych from around 1300.

While the frame is original, the decoration that originally ornamented the center of the pediment has been lost.

== Imagery, symbolism, and technique ==
=== Oil lamp, ostrich egg, and rosary ===
Hanging above the Madonna and in between the festooned garlands hangs a burning oil lamp with a flame, surmounted by a large ostrich egg, symbolizing the Virgin birth. Ostrich eggs were typically hung over altars that were dedicated to the Virgin Mary and can be found in later Italian Renaissance paintings, including Pierro della Francesca's Brera Madonna(1472) and Giovanni Bellini's San Zaccaria Altarpiece (1505). Below the oil lamp is a strand of red rosary beads.

=== References to the East: Pseudo-Arabic script and oriental carpet ===
Mantegna utilized pseudo-Arabic script to portray the holiness of the saints painted in the altarpiece. Pseudo-Arabic script is a kind of writing that has no linguistic or actual meaning, but rather is a kind of script inspired by the Arabic alphabet. This script can be seen in the garments, and haloes surrounding the Madonna and Child, function to further emphasize their greatness and holiness. The incorporation of the pseudo-Arabic script in these specific areas is an idea that is borrowed from the Islamic embroidered textiles, known as tiraz. In addition, the illusionistic portrayal of an oriental carpet in this Renaissance painting, found draped at the foot of the throne on which the Madonna sits, functions as both an expensive and honorific covering, but also allowed Mantegna to show off his skill a painting such a finely crafted object that was produced solely in Islamic lands. Furthermore, the oriental carpet spatially demarcated the space of the Madonna as holy and sacred. A similar Italian Renaissance example can be found in Lorenzzo Lotto's St Antoninus Giving Alms (completed in 1542), which shows two oriental carpets (referred to as Lotto Carpet).

=== Linear perspective ===
Another technique Mantegna employed in the San Zeno Altarpiece was linear point perspective in order to enhance the continuous image behind the pillars so as to make the image appear more realistic to the external world. The illusionism of the image was further achieved through the real four wooden carved columns of the frame, which are located in the space of the viewer, are unified with the painted garlands that are located in the immediate foreground of the pictorial space. Moreover, Mantegna's use of perspective allows the saints and several of the architectural elements and decorations to recede into the space, furthering the illusion of depth. Mantenga's convincing spatial depth found in the San Zeno Altarpiece began a stylistic and technical tradition that would continue on through the Cinquecento in other illusionistic altarpieces by Giovanni Bellini, including: San Giobbe Altarpiece (1487); Frari Triptych (1488); San Zaccaria Altarpiece (1505).

== Provenance ==
The San Zeno Altarpiece was originally created for the Basilica of San Zeno in the town of Verona in northern Italy and currently still stands there. As described above (see: predella), Napoleon stripped the panel apart, taking the central panel, as well as the three predella paintings to Paris in 1797. Only the central panel was returned after Napoleon lost power in 1815, but the three original predella have never been returned, and thus those seen in the altarpiece today are copies.

== Predella ==
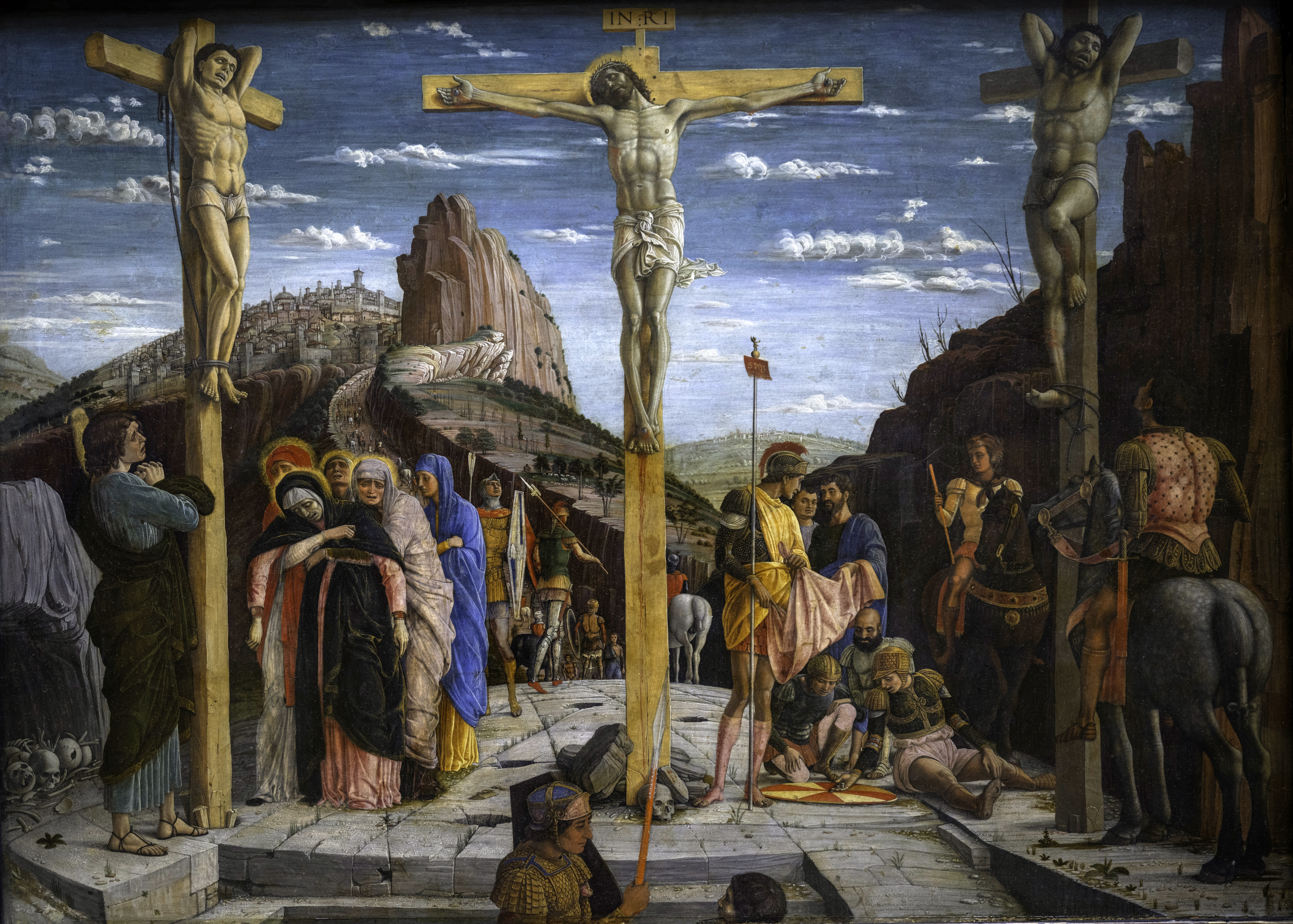
The central panel (The Crucifixion)

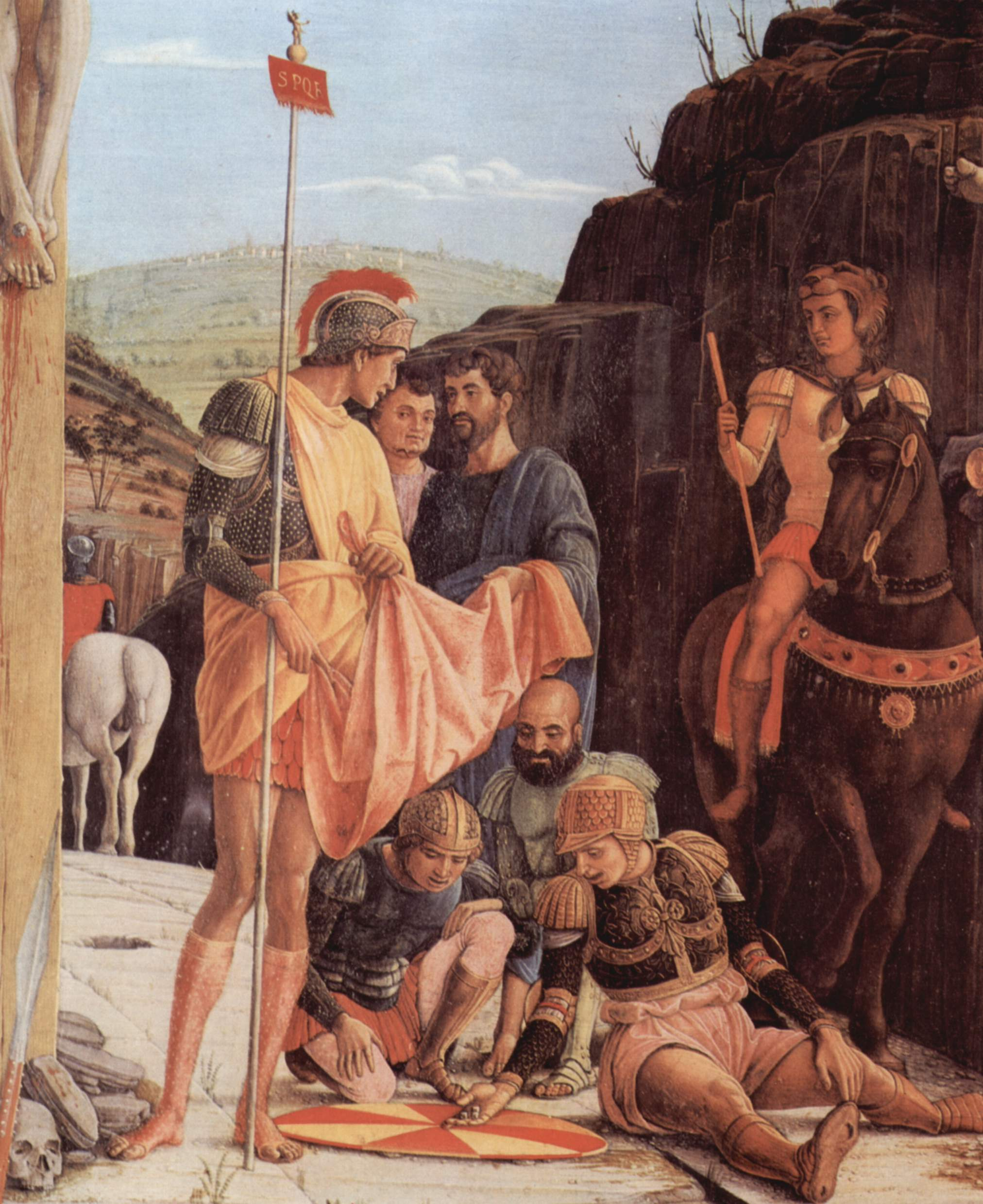
Detail of the central panel

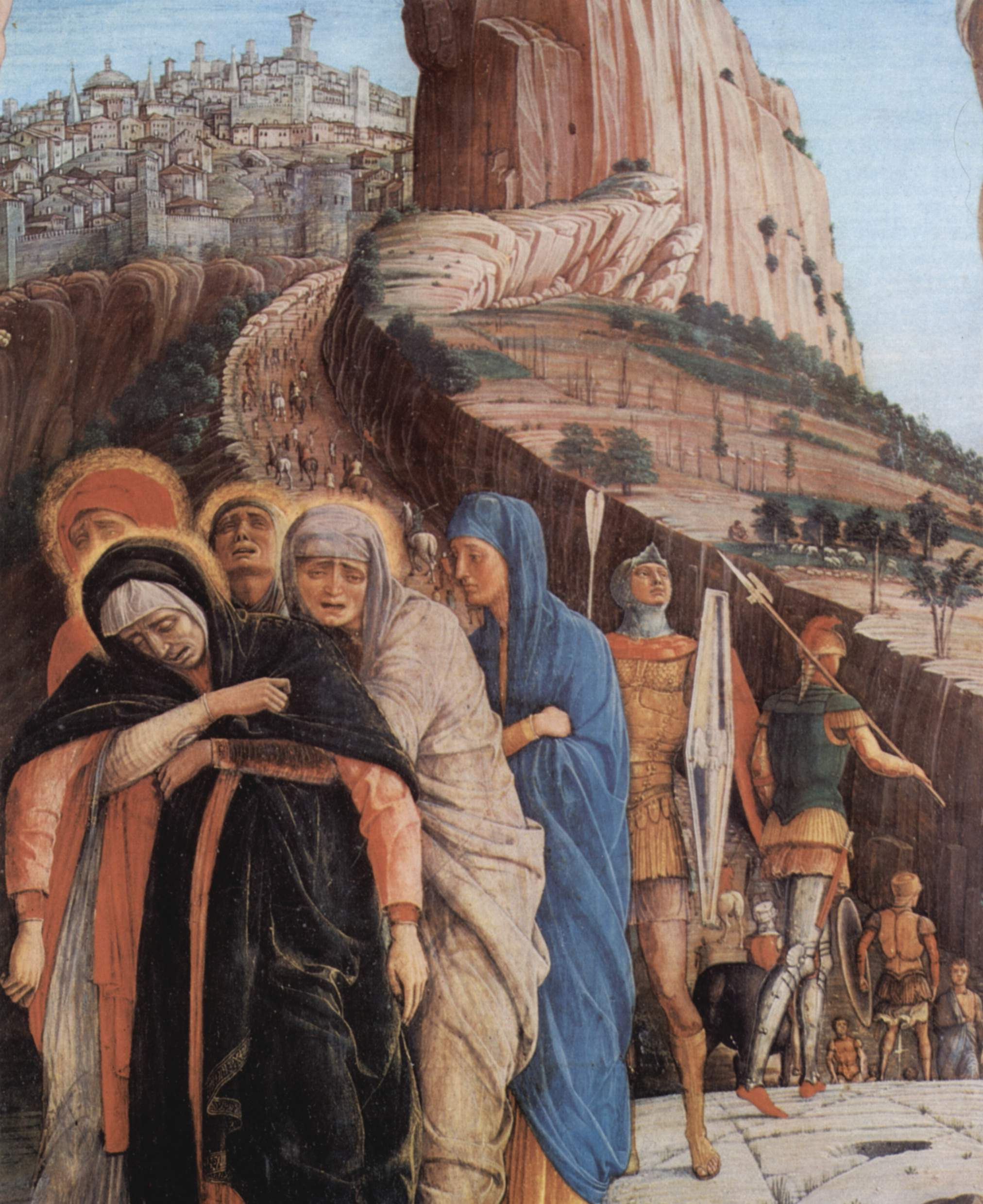
Detail of the central panel
