= Ercole Ruggiero =

Italian painter (fl. 17th century)

Ercole Ruggiero (fl. 17th century) was an Italian painter of the Baroque period.

He was initially a devoted pupil of Francesco Gessi in Bologna; and also was known as Ercolino del Gessi or Ercolino da Bologna. His brother was known as Battistino del Gessi, initially a pupil of Domenichino and Gessi, then became a follower of Pietro da Cortona. He died during the papacy of Urban VIII.
