= Virgin and Child (Rubens) =

Painting by Peter Paul Rubens

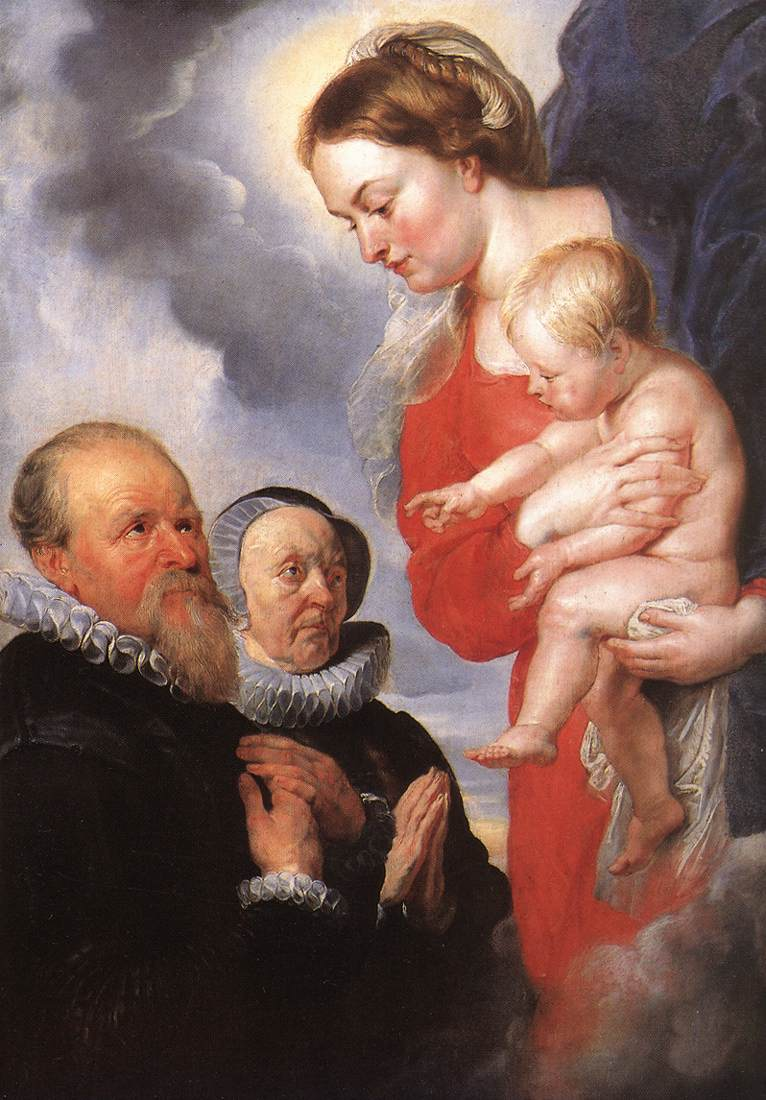
Virgin and Child (c. 1608–1621) by Rubens

Virgin and Child is a painting by Rubens, commissioned in 1604 and completed between 1608 and 1621. It was seized by France in 1803 and is now in the Musée des Beaux-Arts Tours.

== History ==
It was commissioned by Anne Antheunis (1545-1621), widow of Alexander I Goubau, (1540-1614), grand almoner of Antwerp, shortly after her husband's death. She intended is as an ex voto for their joint funeral monument, in the cathedral's masons' chapel. Then in Italy, Rubens only began the work on his return to Flanders in 1608, including a posthumous portrait of Alexandre-Jean and one of Anne from life. It was complete by 1621, the date of Anne's death.
