= Giovanni Battista Ruggieri =

Italian painter

Giovanni Battista Ruggieri (died 1640) was an Italian painter of the Baroque period. He was born in Bologna. In 1606 he became a pupil of Domenichino. He was also called Battistino del Gessi, because later he became a pupil of Francesco Gessi.

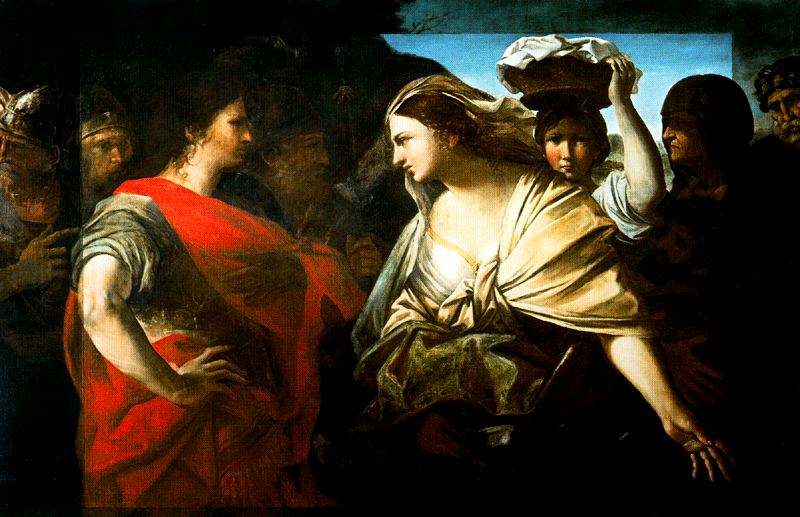
David and Abigail, Galleria Nazionale d'Arte Antica, Rome.

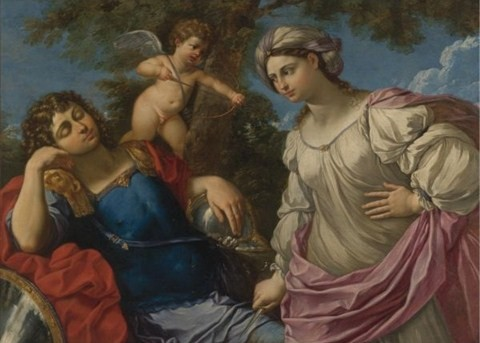

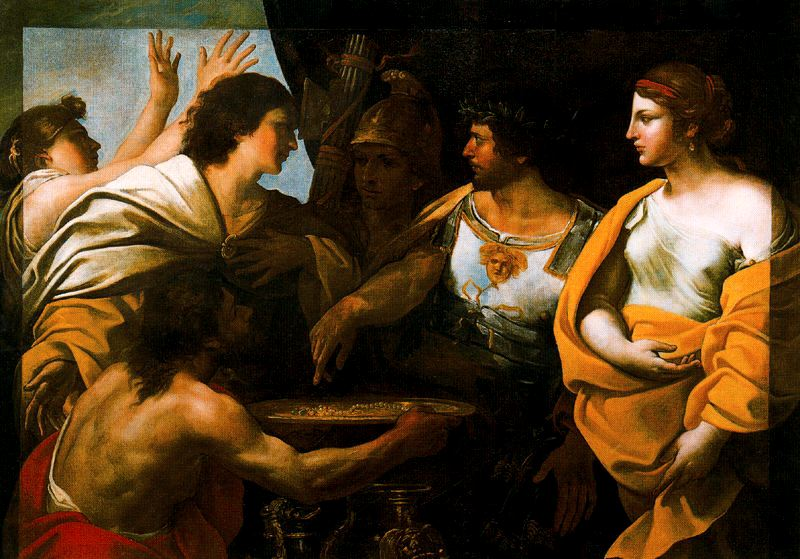

Ruggieri accompanied Gessi to Naples during the time of Urban VIII. He was patronized by the Giustiniani family and died in Rome in 1640. His brother Ercole was also educated by Gessi.
