= Pietà with Saint Francis and Saint Mary Magdalene =

Painting by Annibale Carracci

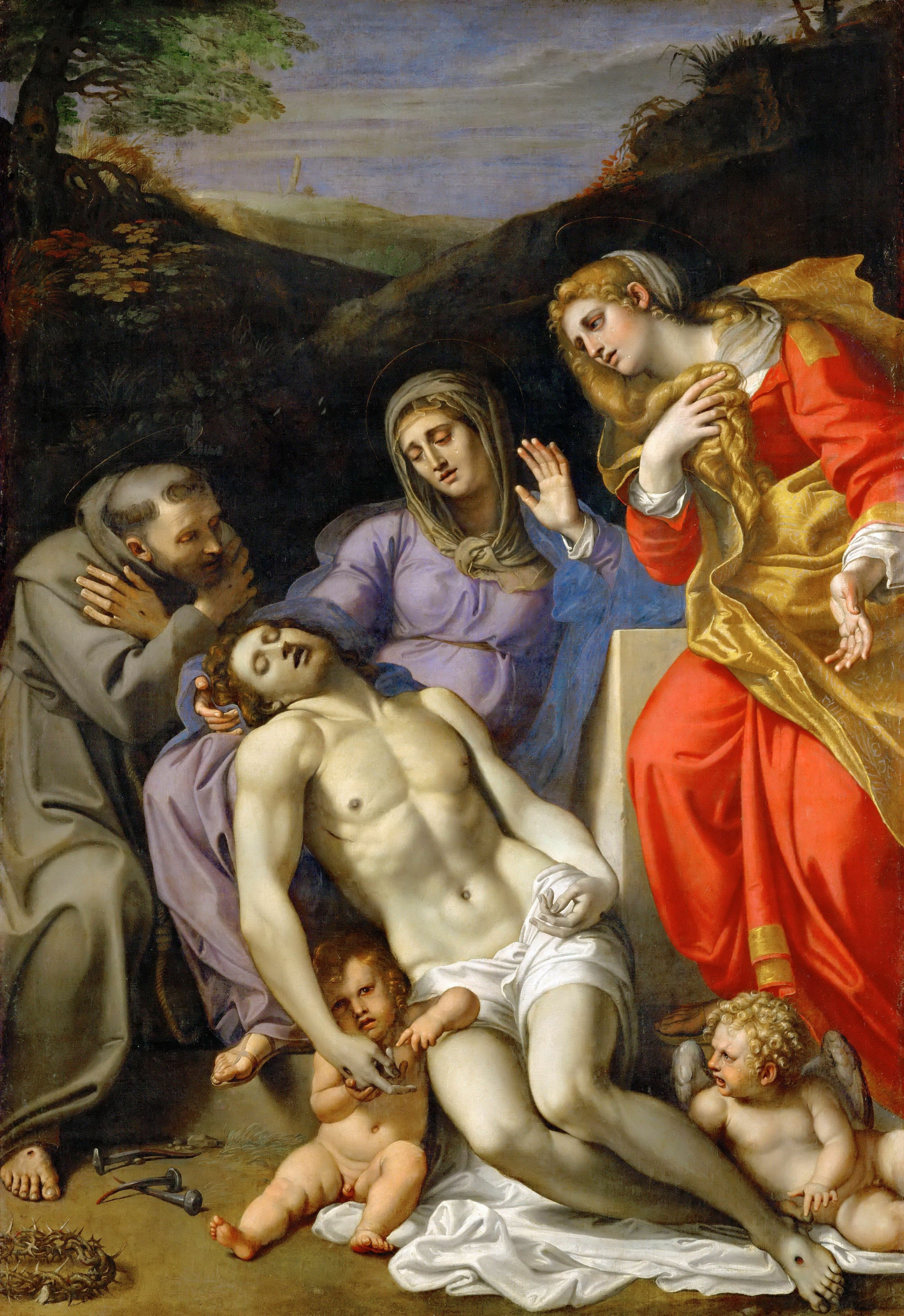
Pietà with Saint Francis and Saint Mary Magdalene (1602–1607) by Annibale Carracci

Pietà with Saint Francis and Saint Mary Magdalene is an oil painting on canvas executed ca. 1602–1607 by the Italian Baroque painter Annibale Carraci. Now in the Louvre, it was looted from the Mattei family chapel in San Francesco a Ripa in Rome by Napoleon's troops in 1797 and was not returned at the end of the Napoleonic Wars.

It is thought to be the work referred to in a letter by Giovanni Battista Agucchi reproduced in Carlo Cesare Malvasia's Felsina Pittrice – other references in Malvasia date the letter to 1607. Agucchi's words suggest he was referring to a recent work by Annibal and – though the letter does not refer explicitly to the work now in the Louvre – the context suggests that the Louvre work is the only one to which Agucchi could be referring. A second undated letter by Agucchi explicitly refers to the Pietà in the Mattei chapel, whilst another passage in Felsina confirms that that Pietà was one of Carracci's last works but states that others had dated the work much earlier.

== Date ==
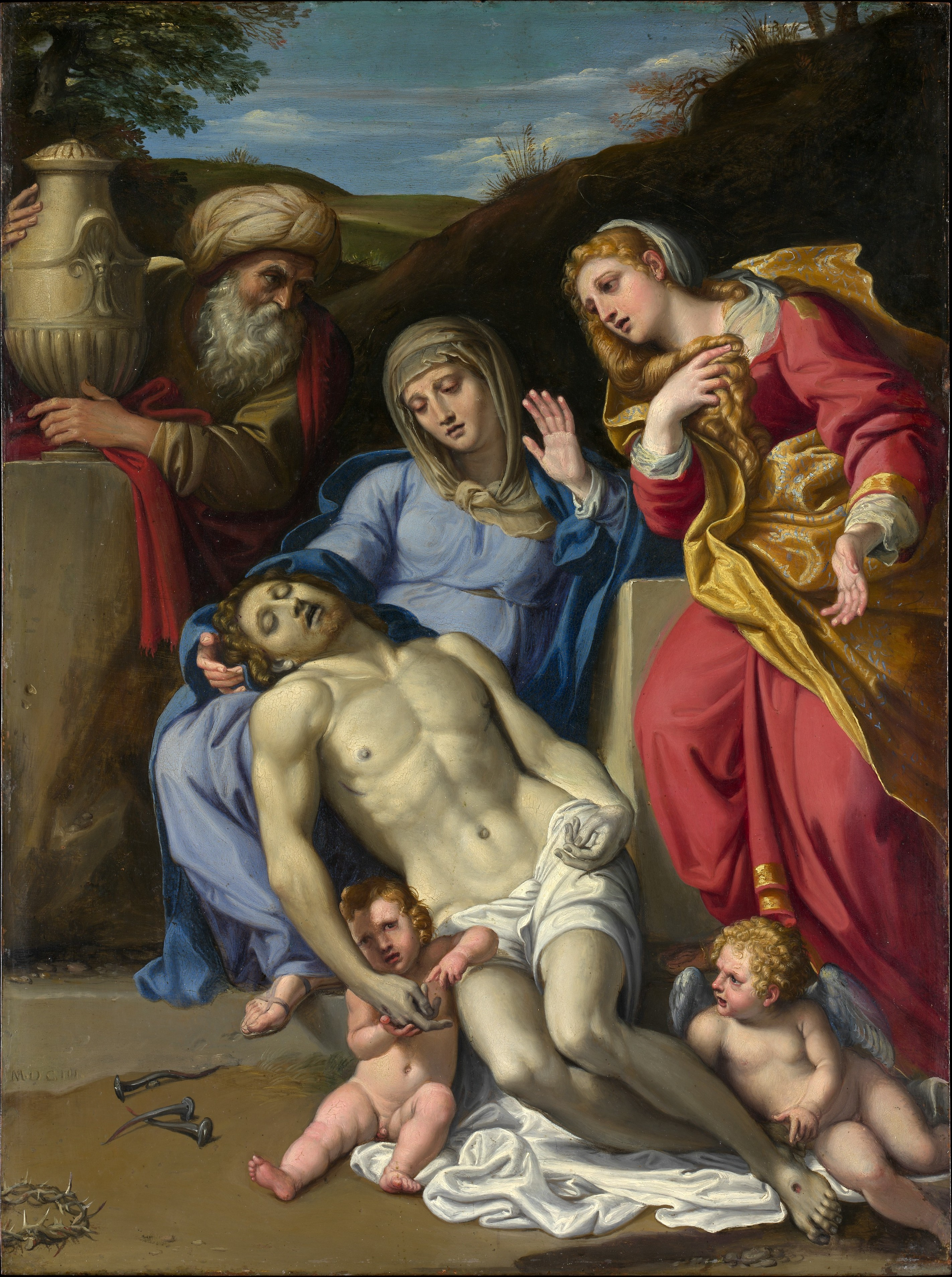
Domenichino, Pietà, 1603, Metropolitan Museum of Art, New York, with the date MDCIII (1603) at bottom left

Tietze, Mahon, Cavalli and Posner have all argued that 1607 is much too late a date for the work. However, a 1603 Domenichino copy of the work on copper backs a date very close to Carracci's death or at least just before Domenichino made the copy, although it seems to disprove the 1607 date in Agucchi's letter. It replaces Francis of Assisi with Joseph of Arimathea, perhaps suggesting that Carracci originally painted Joseph but modified it to Francis once he had a definite location for the work, namely in a church dedicated to Francis, and that Domenichino made the copy before Carraci made the modification. A preparatory drawing by Annibale (now in the Jenisch Museum in Vevey) with Joseph but without Francis was thought to confirm this theory until a 1994 X-ray of the Louvre work showed the absence of pentimenti.

Another theory suggests that the area now occupied by Francis was blank when the copy was made, with Domenichino adding a figure of Joseph (either from his own invention or from rejected preparatory drawings by Annibale) and with Annibale later filling the blank with a figure of Francis.

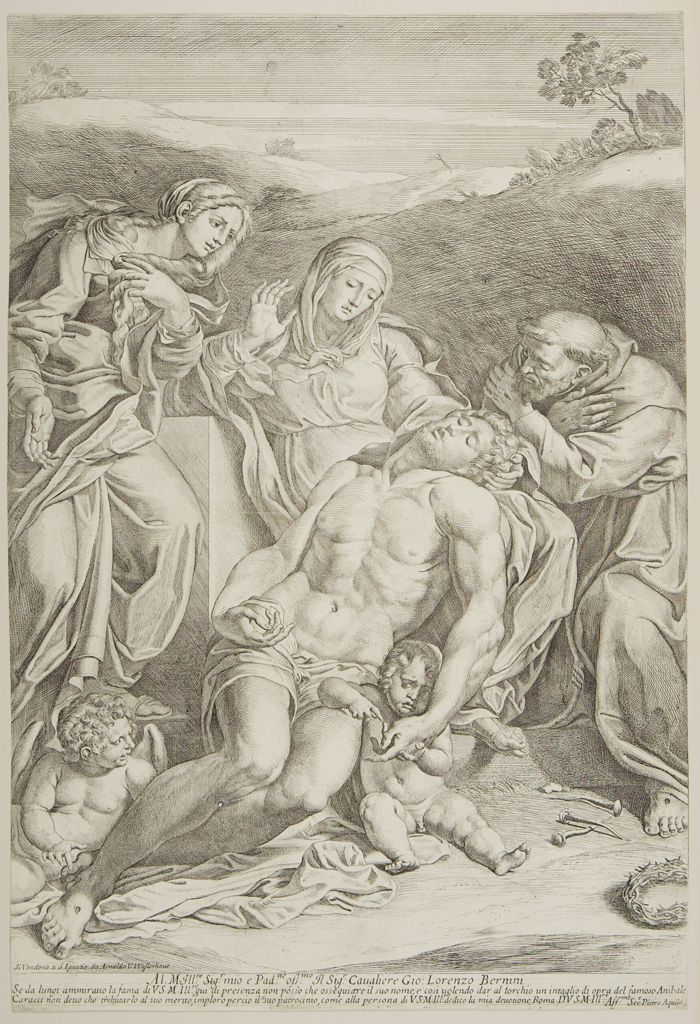
Pietro Aquila, Pietà with Saint Francis and Saint Mary Magdalene, 17th century, Cambridge (Massachusetts), Fogg Art Museum

However, there remains the conflict between the sources (Agucchi and Malvasia), who date the painting to 1607 (or in any case say it is a very late work by Annibale), and the stylistic evidence and particularly the ante quem constituted by the copper by Domenichino (1603).

The hypothesis of an interruption of a few years in the execution of the Mattei Pietà could be the explanation: the painting was created (at least in large part, if not entirely) around 1602 and copied shortly after by Domenichino (who added Joseph of Arimathea, absent in the original). Only a few years later, around 1607, Annibale's canvas would be completed and publicly exhibited. The sources would therefore account for this second moment, rather than the actual date of the work's completion (or at least most of it).

Finally, it has been noted that the figure of Saint Francis in the Louvre canvas appears disjointed from the rest of the composition, and it has been suggested that it was painted by a hand other than Annibale. If the saint was later included in Mattei's Pietà, this could be explained by the fact that Annibale delegated assistance for the final completion of the work.

Pietro Aquila made an engraving from the painting which he dedicated to Gian Lorenzo Bernini.

== Description and style ==
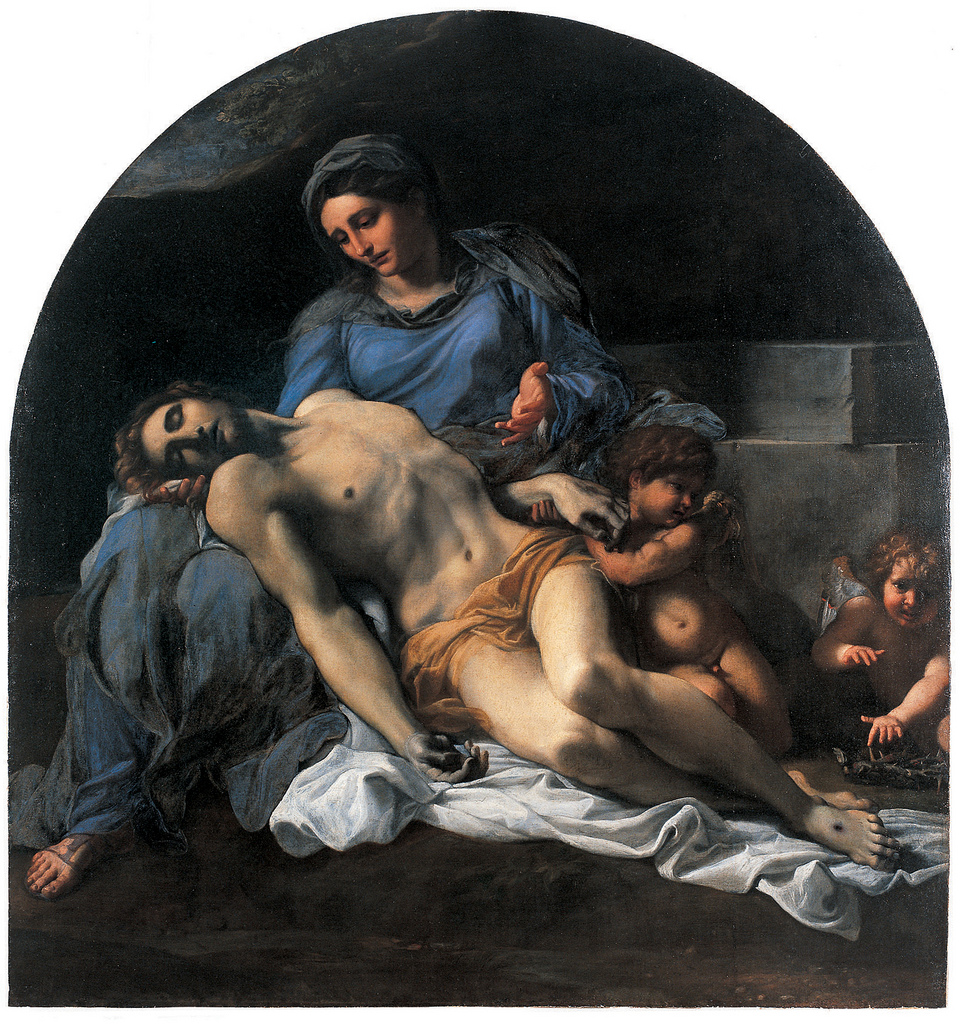
Annibale Carracci, Pietà, ca. 1600, Naples, Museo nazionale di Capodimonte

The Pietà with St. Francis and Mary Magdalene is a significant example of the tendency towards the idealization of style that characterizes the last years of Annibale's artistic production, that is, the attempt to reproduce an ideal beauty created by the perfection of forms and design.

The comparison with the Pietà of Naples from a few years earlier is eloquent in this sense: while the painting of Naples is pervaded by a strong emotional charge that immediately invests the observer, the Pietà of the Louvre in comparison may appear colder.

The difference in chromatic tones, soft and nuanced in the Neapolitan painting, bright and clear in the one in the Louvre, also marks this stylistic gap. The different position of Christ and the Virgin Mary in the two works can be read in the same way: while in the Naples Pietà Jesus buries his head and torso in the lap of his mother, who in turn seems to be reaching out to embrace him, in the Louvre canvas Mary is more distant from her son and even her expression of pain may seem more conventional.

According to Donald Posner, one of the leading scholars of Annibale Carracci, in Mattei's Pietà one can detect a certain difficulty on Annibale's part in combining the extreme idealization of the style of his later production (which the American historian dates from around 1602 and for which he uses the definition of "hyper-idealism") with large-format paintings. Indeed, Annibale's twilight masterpieces, in this light, are almost all small or medium-sized works, such as the Pietà with the Three Marys, the Domine, quo vadis?, or the Pietà with Two Angels in Vienna.

However, the number of known copies, the engravings taken from the Trastevere canvas and the laudatory descriptions of the work by contemporary art writers suggest that this work by Annibale also attracted the admiration of his contemporaries.
