= Raffaelle Castellini =

Italian artist

Raffaelle Castellini (1791–1874) was an Italian artist, who was the director of the Mosaic School at the Vatican, and executed the splendid mosaics of The Sibyl of Cumae after Domenichino and St. John the Baptist after Guercino for the Basilica of St. Peter's. He died at Rome in 1864. Page 249
