= Giacomo Castellini =

Italian painter

Giacomo Castellini (active 1678) was an Italian painter of the Baroque period.

He was a pupil of Francesco Gessi in Bologna. He painted a copy of Guido Reni's Massacre of the Innocents for the Basilica of San Petronio.
