= Francesco Gessi =

Italian painter

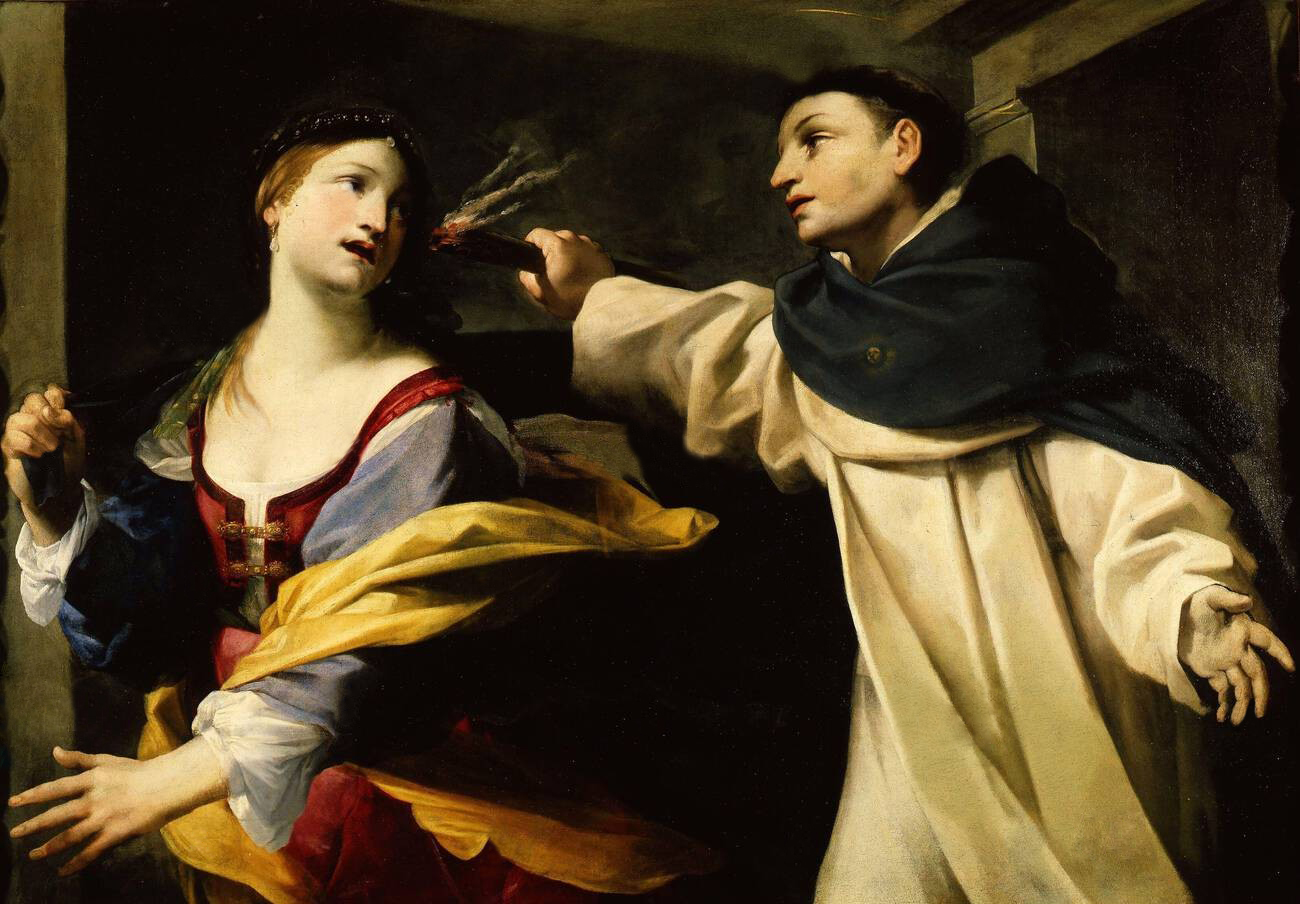
Temptation of St. Thomas Aquinas

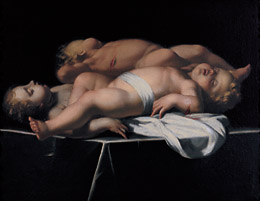
Sleeping Putti.

Francesco Gessi (20 January 1588 – 1649) was an Italian painter of the Baroque period, active mainly in Bologna.

== Biography ==
Born to a noble family, his father noticed his attraction to the arts and placed him in the apprenticeship with Denys Calvaert. This did not last, since he apparently disturbed the other pupils. He was more successful under the tutelage of Guido Reni.

From there, he obtained commissions to fresco in Ravenna, Mantua, and also the Capella del Tesoro in the Naples Cathedral. Supposedly Guido Reni turned down the Neapolitan commission after being threatened by Belisario Corenzio and others. Gessi took up the work, but two of his pupils, Lorenzo Menini and Giovanni Battista Ruggieri, disappeared. Gessi ultimately desisted from attempting to complete the latter in the dangerously competitive art world of Naples.

Returning to Bologna, he began a campaign against his former patron, Reni, attempting to compete and dismissing Reni's achievements. He was able to establish a prolific studio in Bologna. His main collaborator from the studio of Reni was Giovanni Giacomo Sementi, and among his pupils were Giovanni Battista Ruggieri and his brother Ercolino Ruggiero, Giacomo Castellini, Francesco Correggio, and Giulio Trogli.

== Sources ==
- Marchese Antonio Bolognini Amorini (1843). "Parte Quinta". Vite de Pittori ed Artifici Bolognesi. Tipografia Governativa alla Volpe, Bologna. pp. 206–211.
- Biography.
