= Crucifixion (Mantegna) =

Altarprice painted by Andrea Mantegna

The Crucifixion
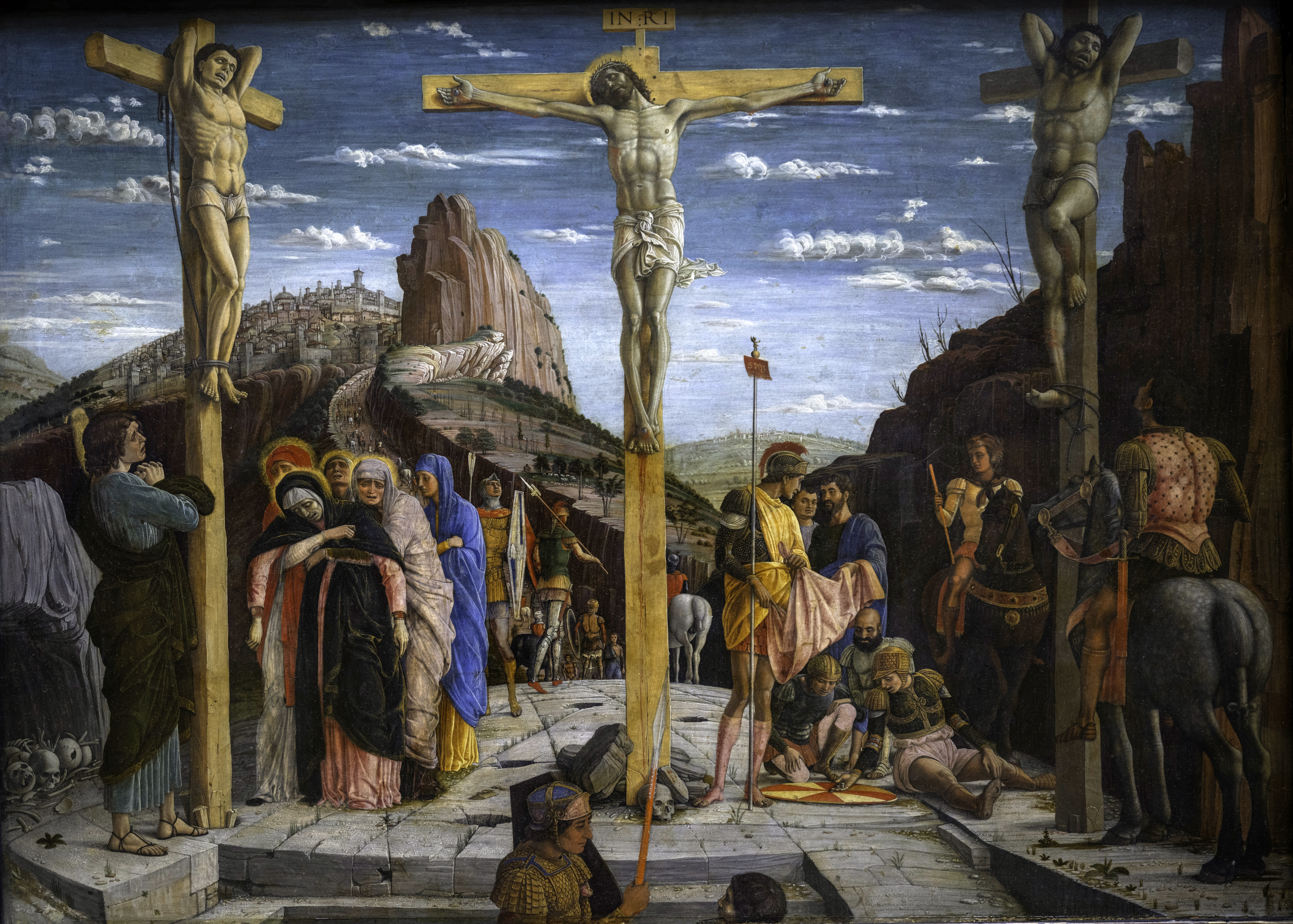
- Artist: Andrea Mantegna
- Year: 1457–1459
- Medium: tempera on panel
- Dimensions: 67 cm × 93 cm (26 in × 37 in)
- Location: Louvre, Paris

The Crucifixion is a panel in the central part of the predella (see image below) of a large altarpiece painted by Andrea Mantegna between 1457 and 1459 for the high altar of San Zeno, Verona (Italy). It was commissioned by Gregorio Correr, the abbot of that monastery.

== History ==
The Crucifixion was brought to the Louvre in 1798 and put on exhibition immediately. In 1806 two of the predella panels (the Mount of Olives and the Resurrection) were sent to the museum of Tours. In 1815 the central panel and the two wings were taken back to Italy and exhibited in the city museum at Verona. After 1918, they were returned to the church of San Zeno, where they still remain - though they are not very easy to see. The commission of 1815 charged with reclaiming the works of art taken from the Veneto left the predella panels in the possession of the Louvre and the museum of Tours.

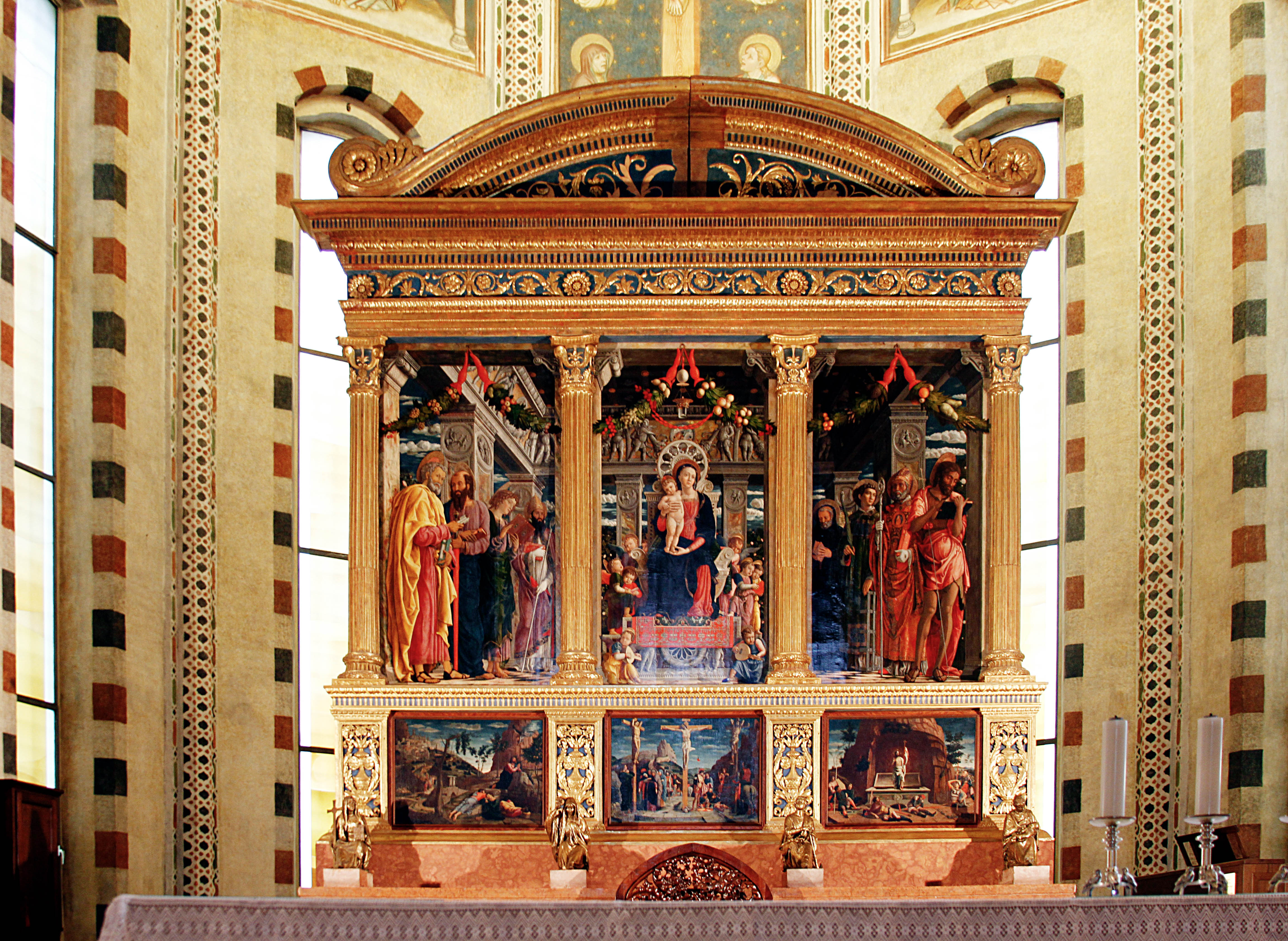
The complete altarpiece by Mantegna (1457-1459)

The Crucifixion was in the middle of the predella, exactly in the centre, as may be seen in the full altarpiece image below. Mantegna was striving after an effect of steep visual perspective such as he had already achieved in the Eremitani chapel at Padua. The figures in the foreground, cut by the frame, increase the effect of recession; the vanishing lines of the ground are curved inwards and somehow contracted. The artist's feeling for nature is revealed by the minuteness with which he has represented every detail of the landscape. The accurate delineation of the Roman soldiers' equipment is evidence of an attitude to antiquity unknown in Florence at that period. Florentine artists sought to understand and emulate the aesthetic quality of antique sculpture and architecture, but cared little for historical exactitude, which Mantegna on the other hand pursued with the passionate devotion of an archaeologist. In fact, the Veneto was from the 14th century onwards, the chief Italian centre for the traffic in anticaglie - Venetian towns owned cabinets d'antiquités long before these were found in Florence.

=== Predella details ===
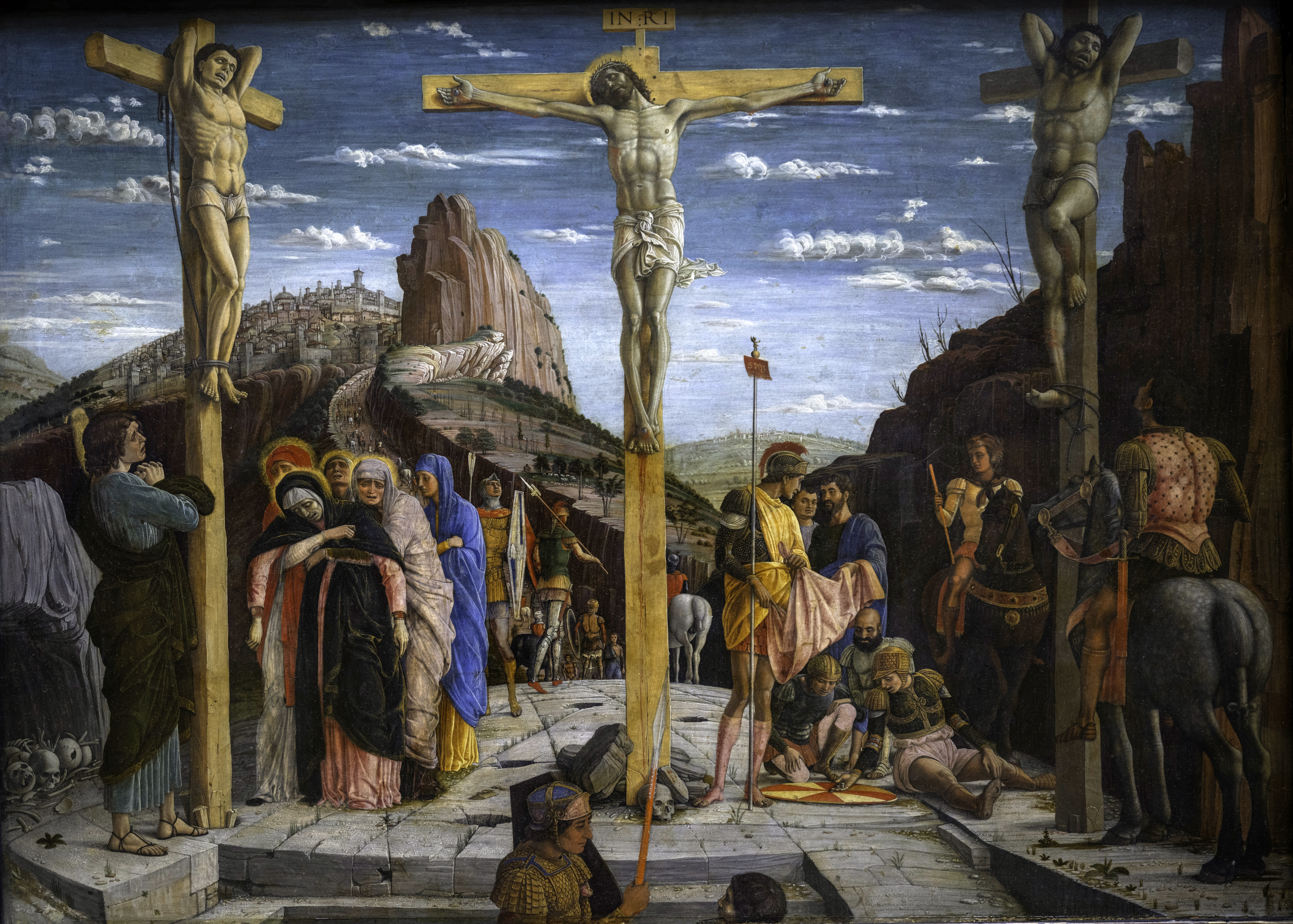
The central panel (The Crucifixion)

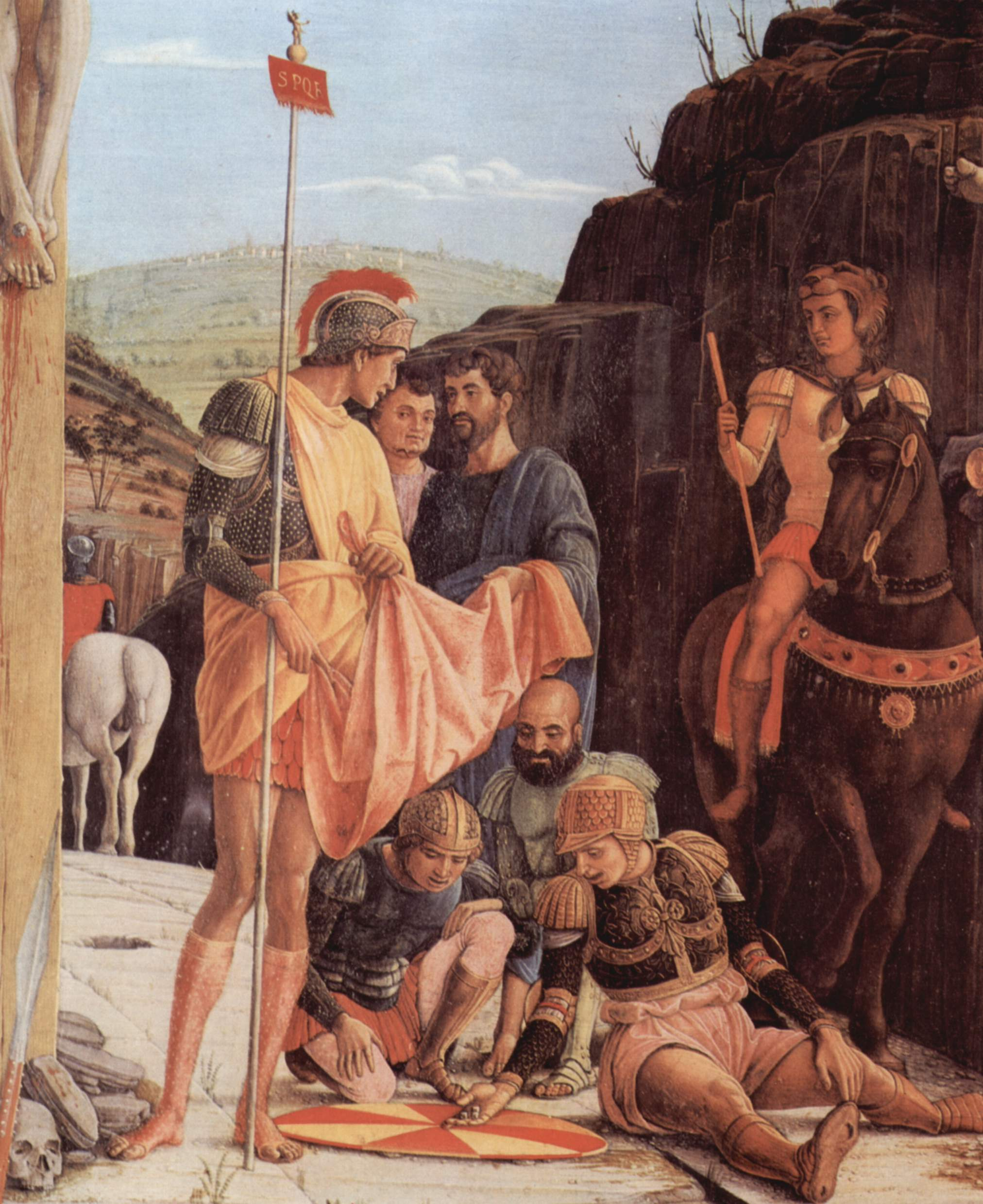
Detail of the central panel

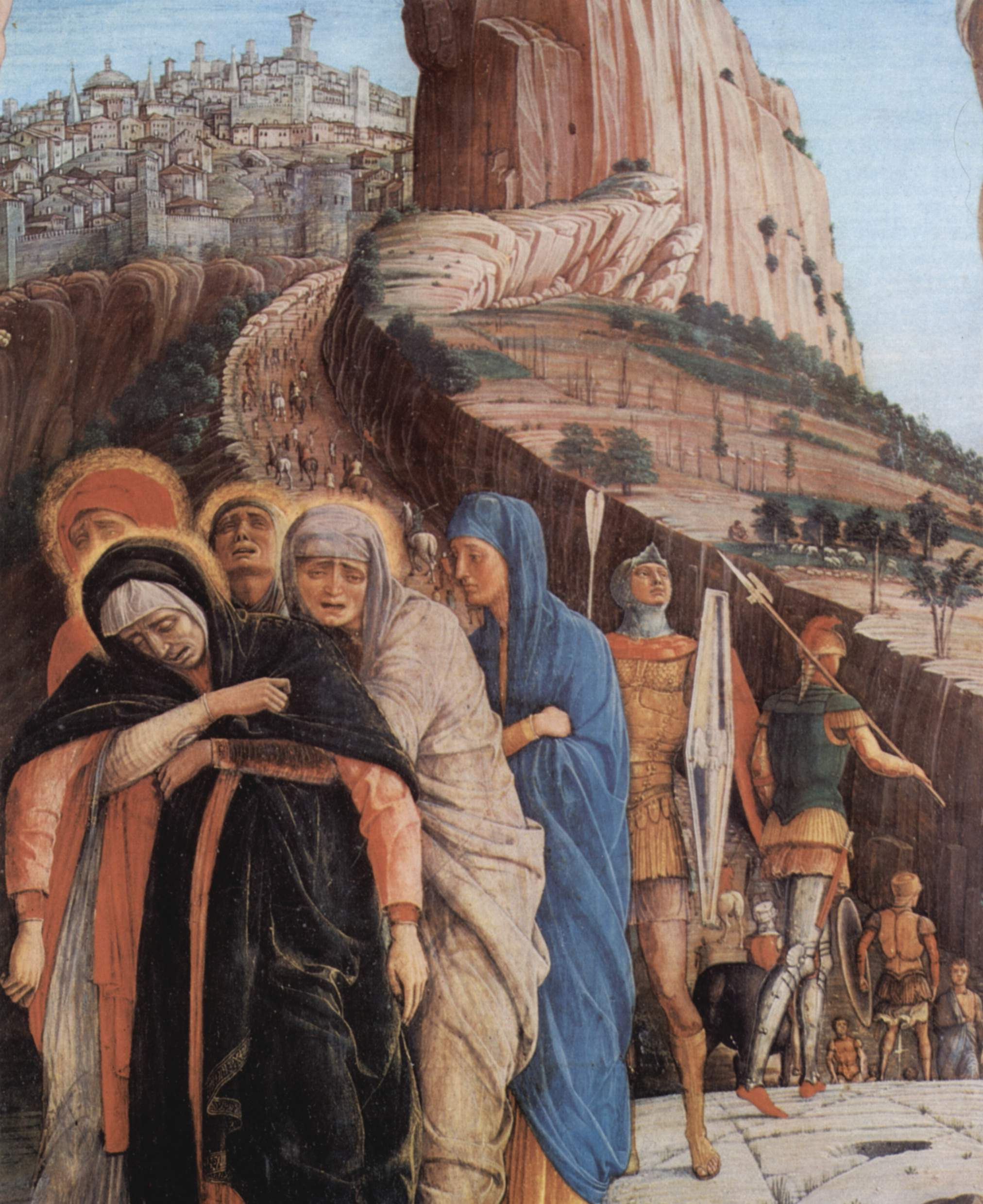
Detail of the central panel

== See also ==
- Altarpiece of San Zeno
- Renaissance art
- Andrea Mantegna
- 100 Great Paintings, 1980 BBC series
