= Agony in the Garden (Mantegna, Tours) =

Painting by Andrea Mantegna

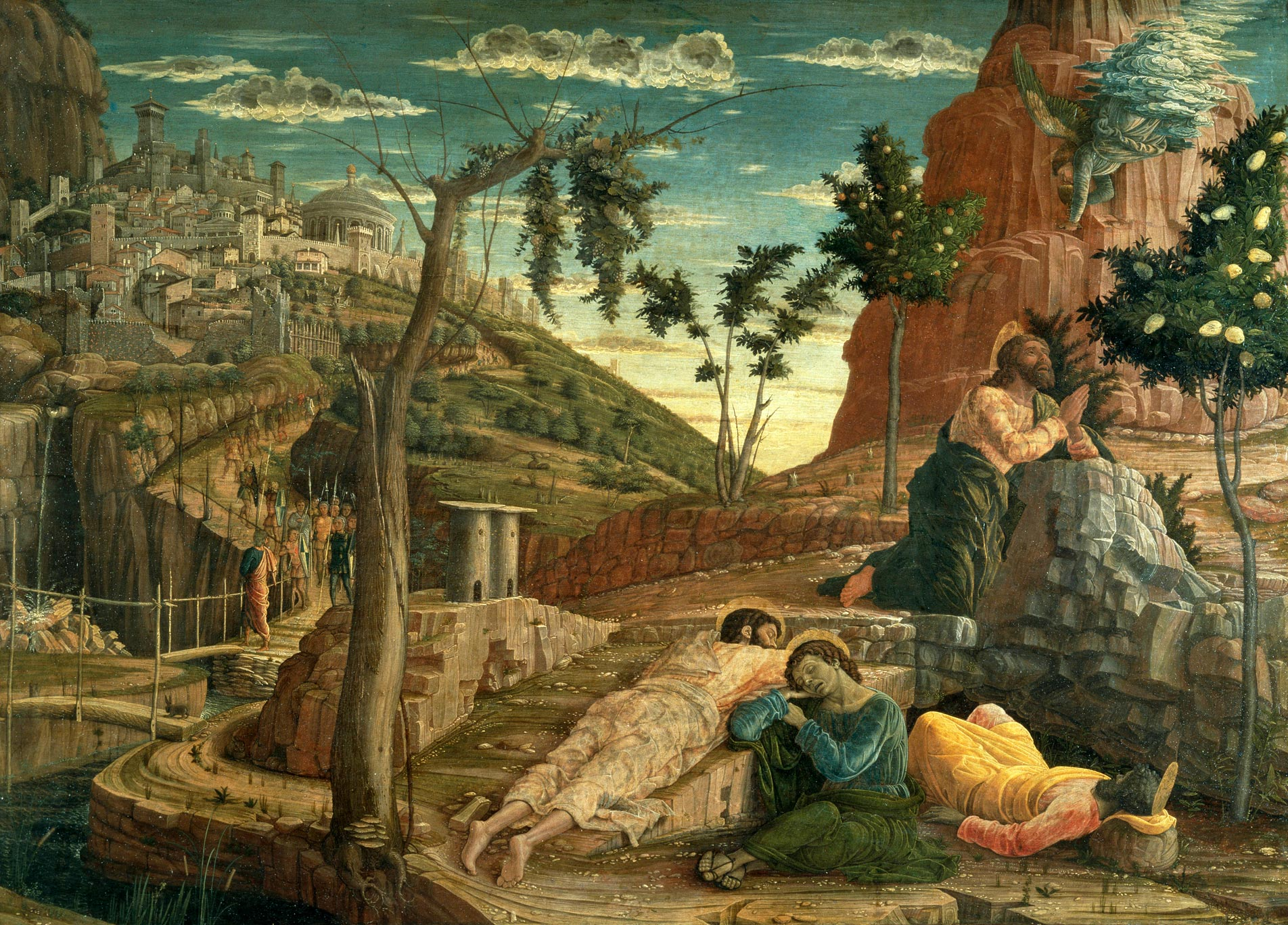
- Artist: Andrea Mantegna
- Year: 1457–59
- Medium: tempera on wood
- Dimensions: 71 cm × 94 cm (28 in × 37 in)
- Location: Musée des Beaux-Arts, Tours

Agony in the Garden is a painting by Andrea Mantegna, conserved at the Musée des Beaux-Arts de Tours, dating from 1457–59.
