= Musée des Beaux-Arts de Tours =

Musée des beaux-arts de Tours
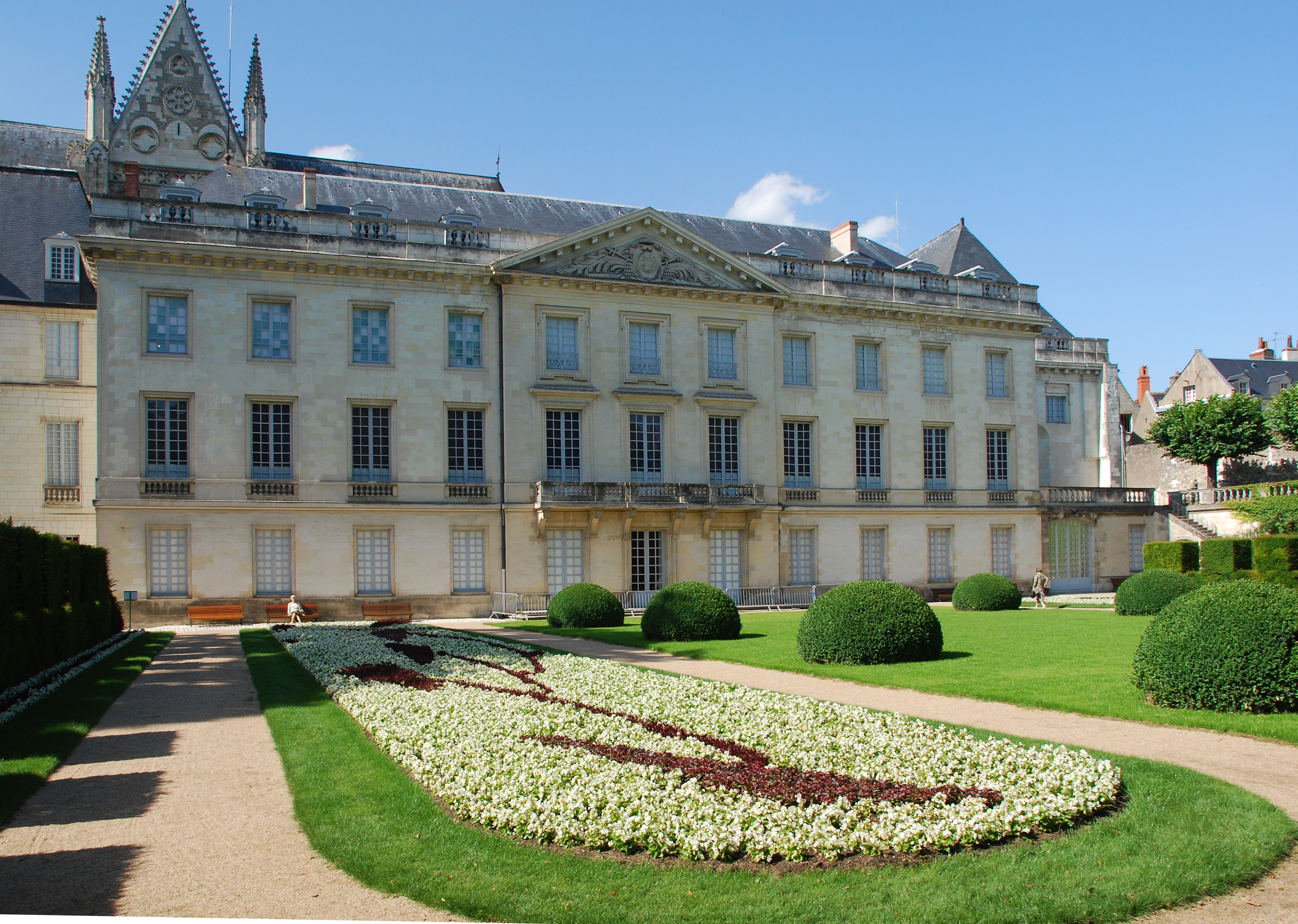
- The Musée des beaux-arts de Tours
- Established: 4 March 1795
- Location: 18, Place Francis Sicard, 37000 Tours
- Coordinates: 47.3952°N 0.6949°E
- Type: Art museum
- Website: www.mba.tours.fr

The Musée des Beaux-Arts de Tours (English: Museum of Fine Arts of Tours) is located in the bishop's former palace, near the cathedral St. Gatien, where it has been since 1910. It displays rich and varied collections, including that of painting which is one of the first in France both in quality and the diversity of the works presented.

== Description ==
In the courtyard, there is a magnificent cedar of Lebanon and a stuffed elephant in a building in front of the museum. This elephant was killed because of a bout of madness during a circus parade by the "Barnum & Bailey" circus in the streets of Tours on 10 June 1902.

The museum has over 12,000 works of which 1,000 are on show to the public. On the ground floor, the museum has a room especially dedicated to Tours art of the fifteenth and sixteenth centuries.

The museum was classified as a monument historique on 27 June 1983.

== Collections ==
The museum has a large and fairly homogeneous collection of paintings, which includes several masterpieces such as two paintings by Andrea Mantegna, from the predella of the San Zeno Altarpiece:

- Collection of Italian Primitives shows works by Mantegna, Antonio Vivarini, Giovanni di Paolo, Lippo d'Andrea and Lorenzo Veneziano. Italian painting of the following centuries is represented by works of Giovanni Battista Moroni, Mattia Preti, Sebastiano Conca, Francesco Cairo and Giuseppe Bazzani.
- The French painting until the nineteenth is displayed by artists such as Claude Vignon, Philippe de Champaigne, Jacques Blanchard, Noël Coypel, Eustache Le Sueur, Jean Jouvenet, Charles de La Fosse, Henri-Camille Danger, Hyacinthe Rigaud, Nicolas de Largillière, Pierre Subleyras, François Lemoyne, Jean-Marc Nattier, François Boucher, Carle Van Loo, Nicolas Lancret, Jean-Baptiste Perronneau, Joseph Vernet, Hubert Robert, Ingres, Théodore Chassériau, Eugène Delacroix, Edgar Degas and Claude Monet.
- The collection of Flemish and Dutch painting presents works by artists such as Rubens (Virgin and Child), Rembrandt, Frans II Francken, Gerard ter Borch, Bartholomeus van der Helst, David Teniers the Younger.
- Modern painting is represented with artworks by Maurice Denis or Maria Elena Vieira da Silva.
- There are sculptures by Jean-Antoine Houdon, Auguste Rodin, Antoine Bourdelle, Alberto Giacometti and Olivier Debré.

== Photos ==
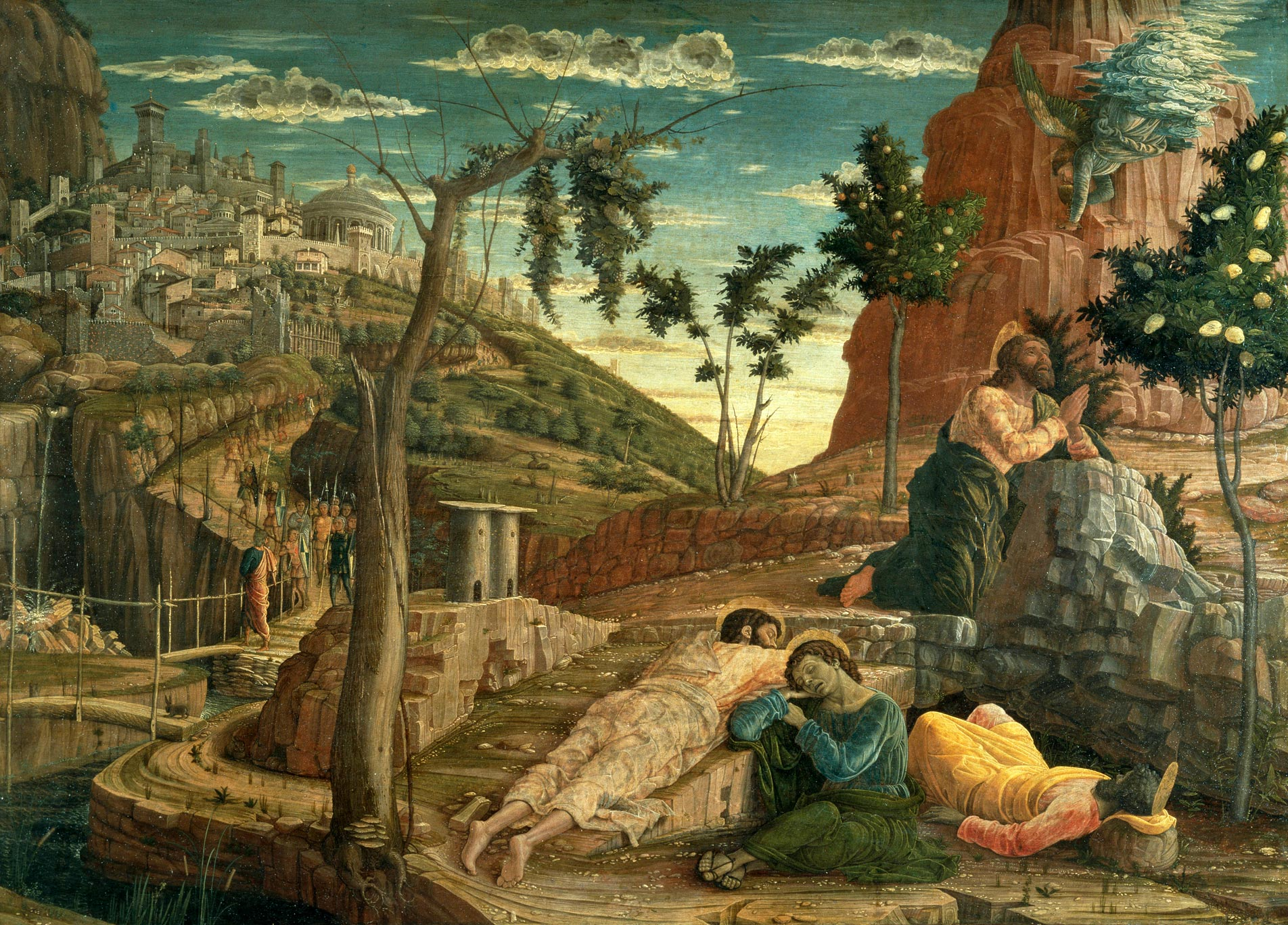
Christ in the garden of olives by Andrea Mantegna, 1459

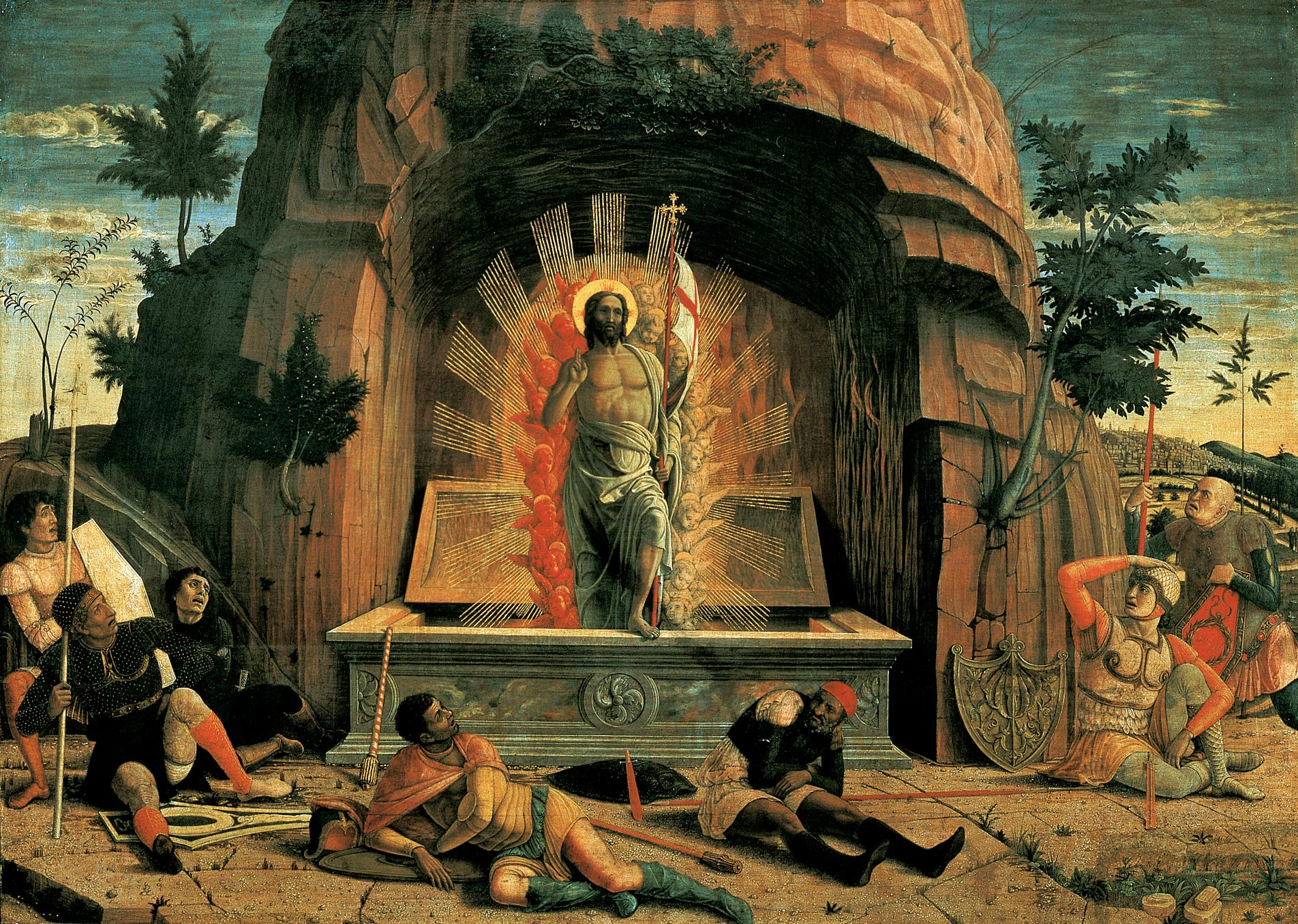
The resurrection by Andrea Mantegna, 1459

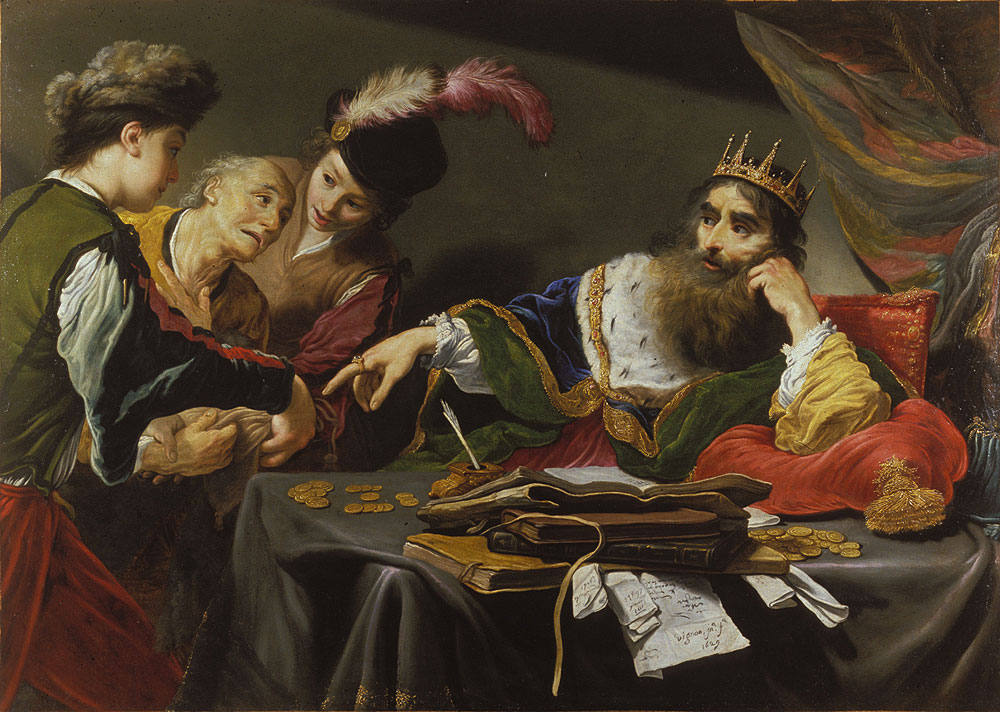
Parable of the Unforgiving Servant by Claude Vignon, oil, 1629

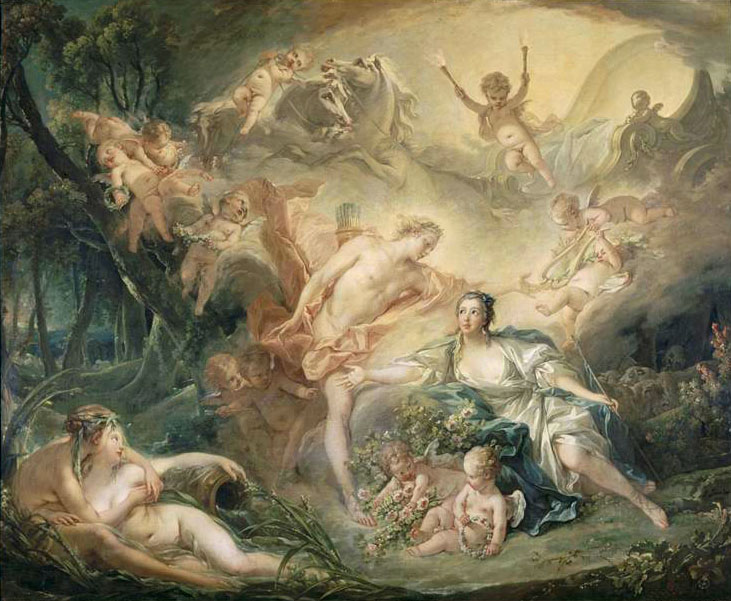
Apollo Revealing his Divinity before the Shepherdess Isse by François Boucher, oil, 1750

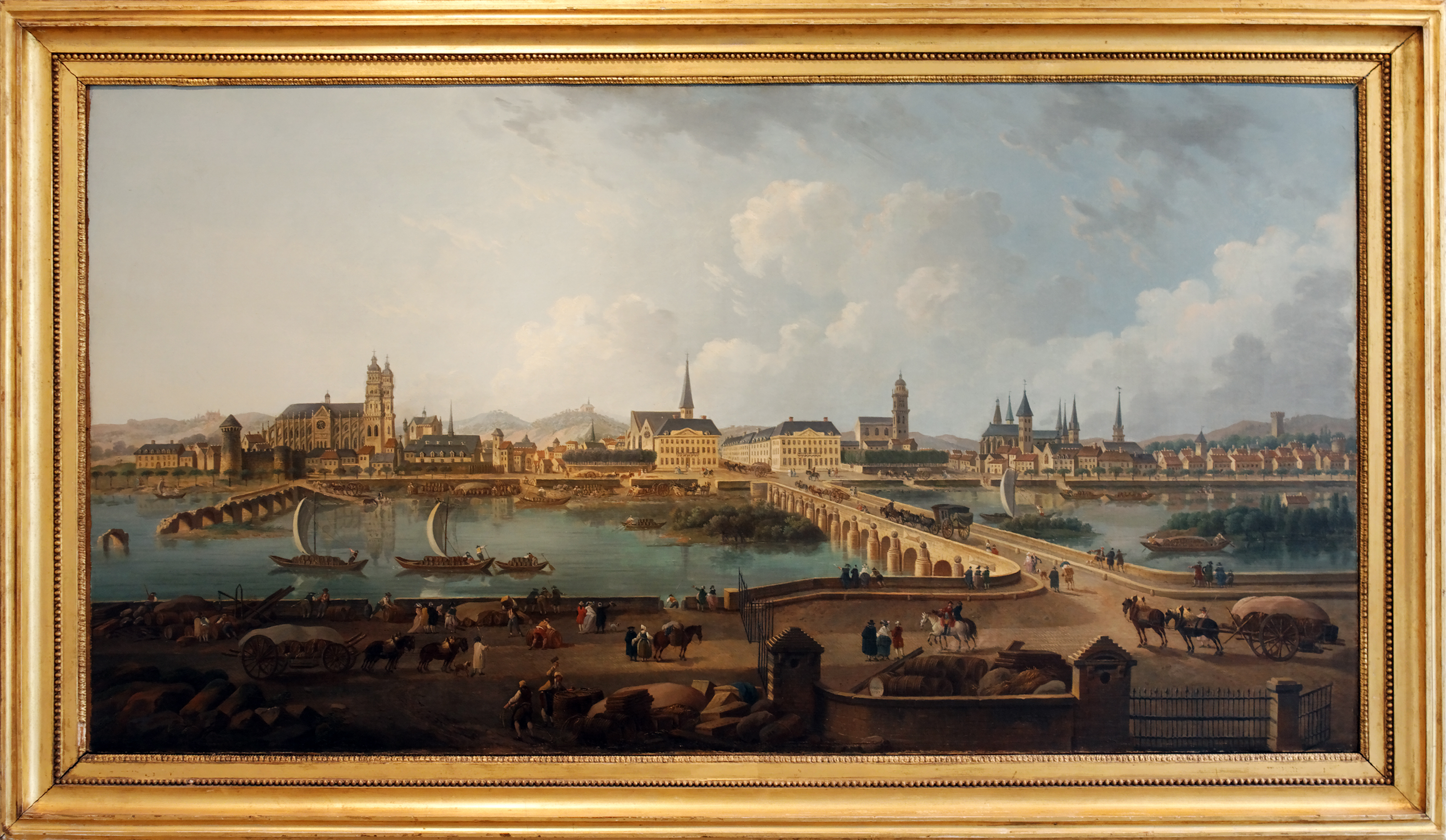
Panoramic view of Tours by Demachy
