= The Dead Christ Mourned =

Painting by Annibale Carracci

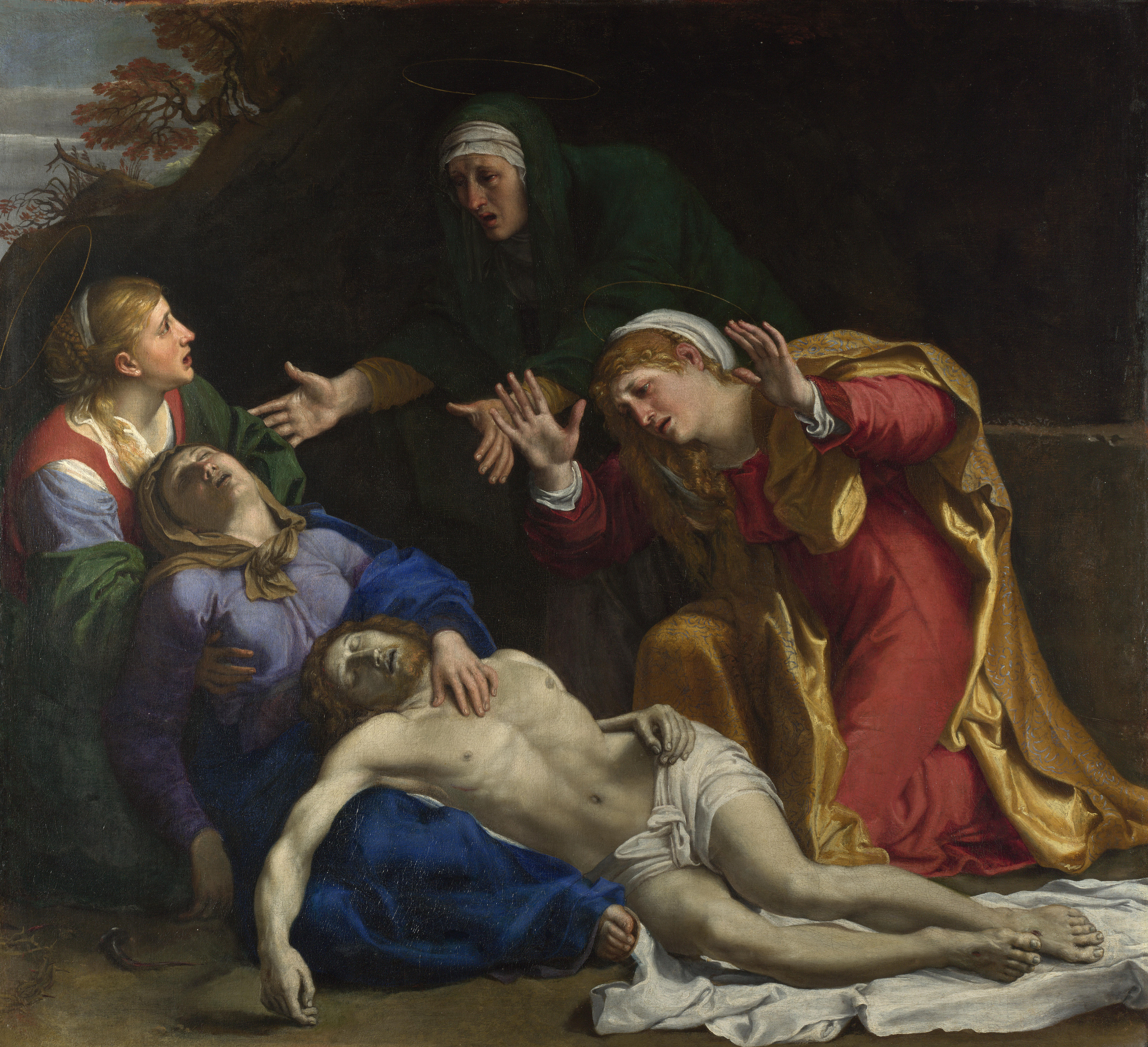
Annibale Carracci, The Dead Christ Mourned, c. 1604. 92.8 cm × 103.2 cm (36.5 in × 40.6 in). Oil canvas. National Gallery, London.

The Dead Christ Mourned (also known as Lamentation of Christ, Pietà with the Three Marys, or The Three Marys) is an oil painting on canvas of c. 1604 by the Italian painter Annibale Carracci. It was in the Orleans Collection before arriving in Great Britain in 1798. In 1913 it was donated to the National Gallery, London, which describes it as "perhaps the most poignant image in [its] collection of the pietà – the lamentation over the dead Christ following his crucifixion – and one of the greatest expressions of grief in Baroque art".

The painting shows the dead body of Christ laid out in a white loincloth, with his legs on a white shroud and his head resting in the lap of his mother, the Virgin Mary, in her characteristic blue robe; overcome with emotion, she has fainted. The mother and son are accompanied by three other figures. Mary Magdalene, with red hair, is kneeling to the right, wearing a red robe and elaborately embroidered yellow cloak, with her hands raised in anguish. They are accompanied by an older woman, standing in a dark green robe to the rear, reaching out towards a younger woman in green, blue and red who is kneeling behind the Virgin Mary to support her. Behind the group is the dark entrance to Christ's tomb, and some trees. The three background figures have slim gold haloes, but Christ and the Virgin do not.

Carracci (1560–1609) painted many scenes of the pietà in his artistic career from around 1580 to around 1605. This version, dated to c. 1604, is thought to be one of the latest. In it Carracci has combined elements of three gospel accounts in one scene: the lamentation over the dead Christ, his entombment, and the discovery of the empty tomb by the Three Marys. The two other women accompanying Christ, the Virgin and the Magdalene cannot easily be identified, but they may be Mary Cleophas and Mary Salome, who are included in some gospel accounts among the women at the crucifixion, and who were also present at the empty tomb with the Virgin Mary.

The composition uses strong diagonals to guide the viewer around the emotional scene, from the triple diagonal of Christ's bare body, through his mother in cool blues to the warmer tones of the young woman supporting her. The pallor and posture of the unconscious Virgin, her head thrown back with right arm extended, echo those of her son. Behind her, the young woman is looking across at the older woman, who looks back with arms outstretched, forming a second diagonal with the brightly clothed Mary Magdalene, whose gaze is also directed back towards the dead body of Christ.

The painting is heavily influenced by Correggio's Lamentation (c. 1524) in Parma, which has a similar triple of Christ's body resting on the lap of the Virgin who is supported by a female figure, with the Magdalene and another woman accompanying them. It may also be influenced by the Lamentation over the Dead Christ by Luca Signorelli (c. 1488–1490), formerly in Siena but now in Glasgow. The Rijksmuseum holds a preparatory chalk drawing by Carracci of the dead Christ.

Although now one of the best-known works by Annibale Carracci, the painting is not mentioned in any contemporary or early sources. The earliest reference to it, dating to 1684, places it in the collection of Jean-Baptiste Colbert, Marquis de Seignelay, in France. Seignelay owned a notable collection of paintings, including other works by Carracci. It is not known whether he acquired this work during his grand tour of Italy or from a French art dealer who had acquired it there. The work then entered the Orleans Collection and along with much of that collection was acquired by British collectors after the French Revolution. It was presented to the National Gallery in 1913 by Rosalind Howard, Countess of Carlisle.

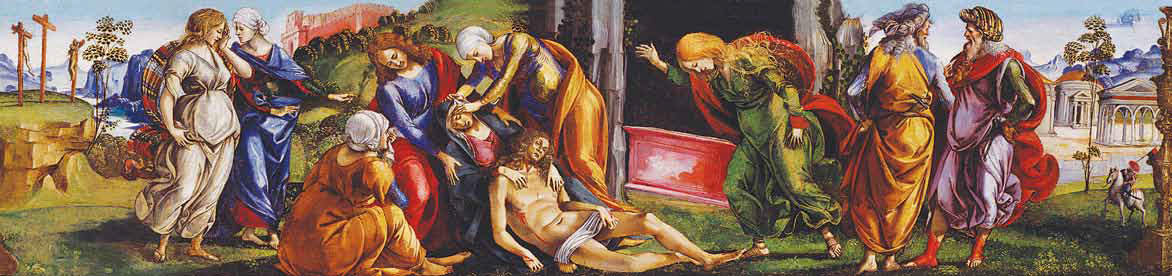
Luca Signorelli, Lamentation over the Dead Christ, 1488–1490, Pollok House

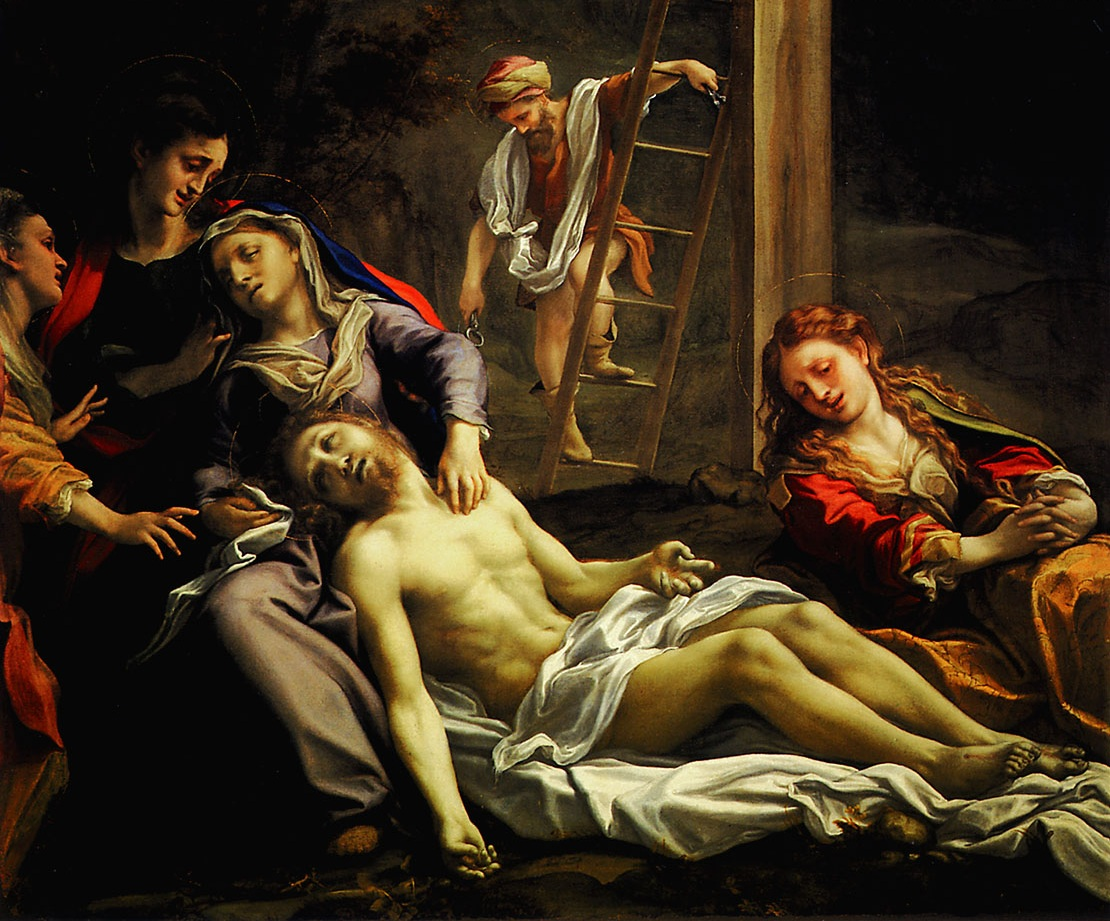
Correggio, Lamentation, c. 1524, Galleria nazionale di Parma

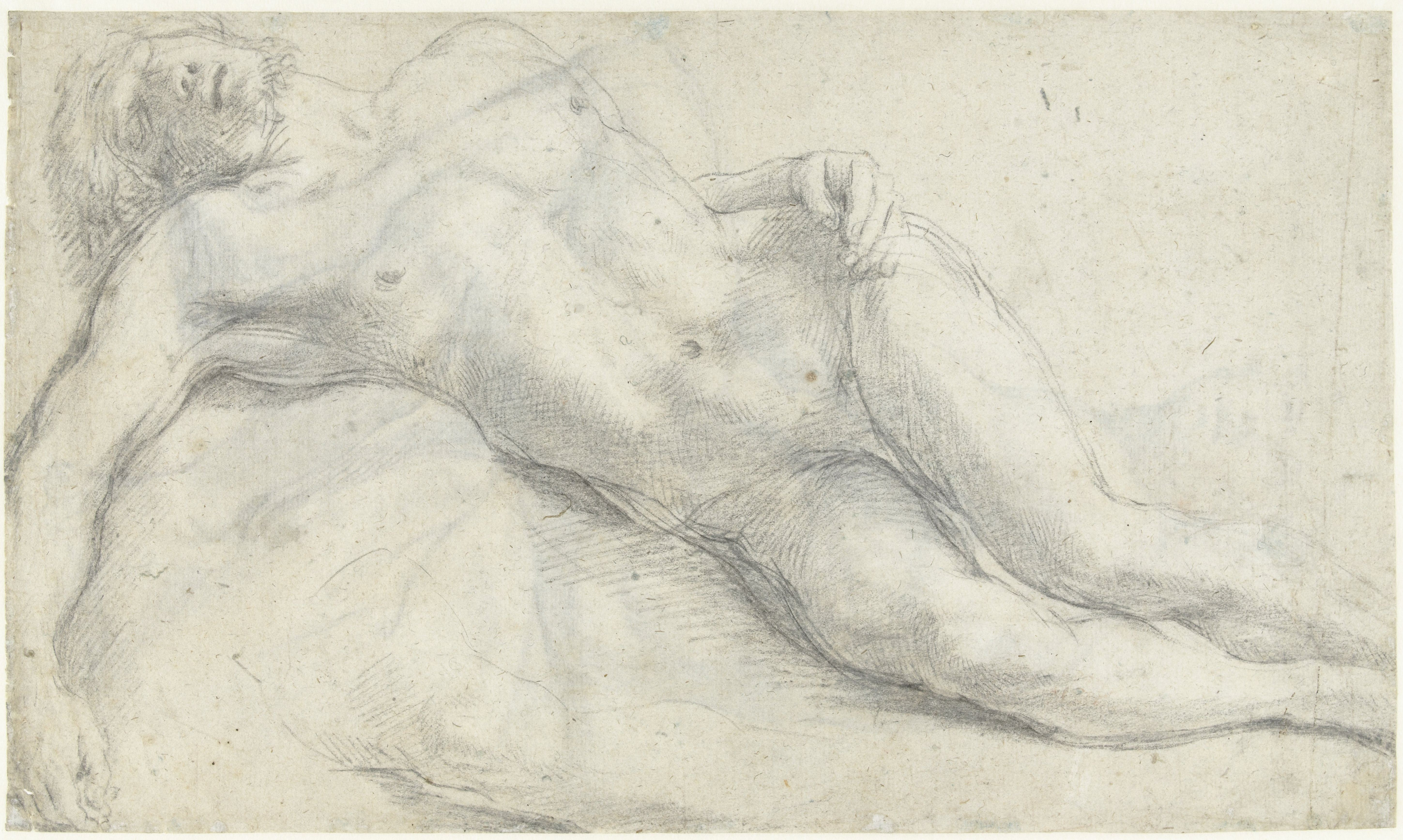
Chalk study, c. 1599–1604, Rijksmuseum

== See also ==
- Pietà with Saints Clare, Francis and Mary Magdalene, 1585, Galleria nazionale di Parma
- Lamentation, 1587–1590, destroyed in 1941
- Pietà, c. 1600, Museo di Capodimonte, Naples
- The Three Marys at the Tomb, c. 1600, Hermitage Museum, Saint Petersburg
- Pietà with Saint Francis and Saint Mary Magdalene, 1602–1607, Louvre, Paris
- Pietà with Two Angels, c. 1603, Kunsthistorisches Museum, Vienna.
- Portable Altarpiece with Pietà and Saints, 1603, Galleria Nazionale d'Arte Antica, Rome
