= Pietà with Two Angels =

Painting by Annibale Carracci

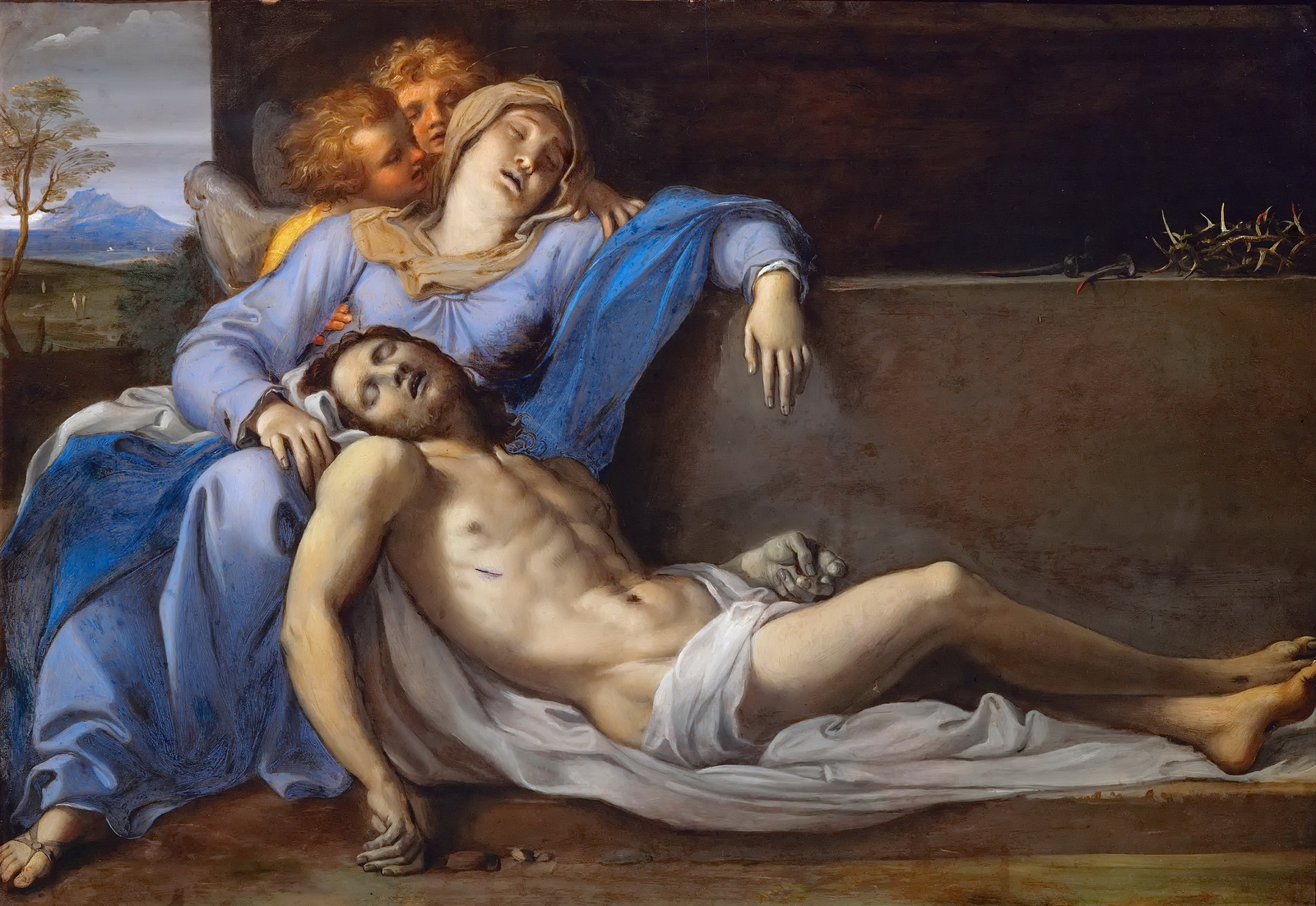
Pietà with Two Angels (c. 1603) by Annibale Carracci

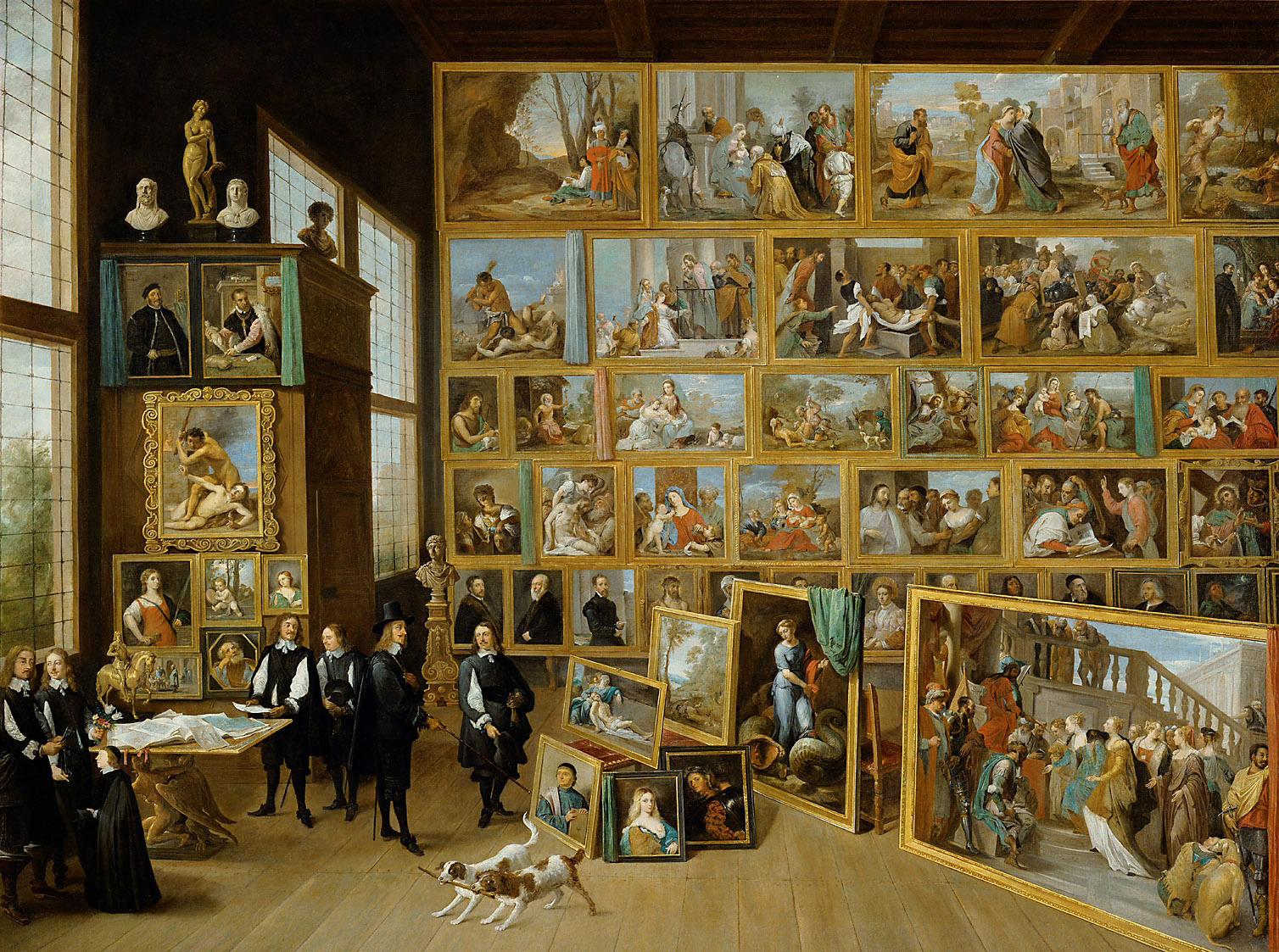
David Teniers the Younger, The Gallery of Archduke Leopold William in Brussels, 1650–1651, Vienna, Kunsthistorisches Museum

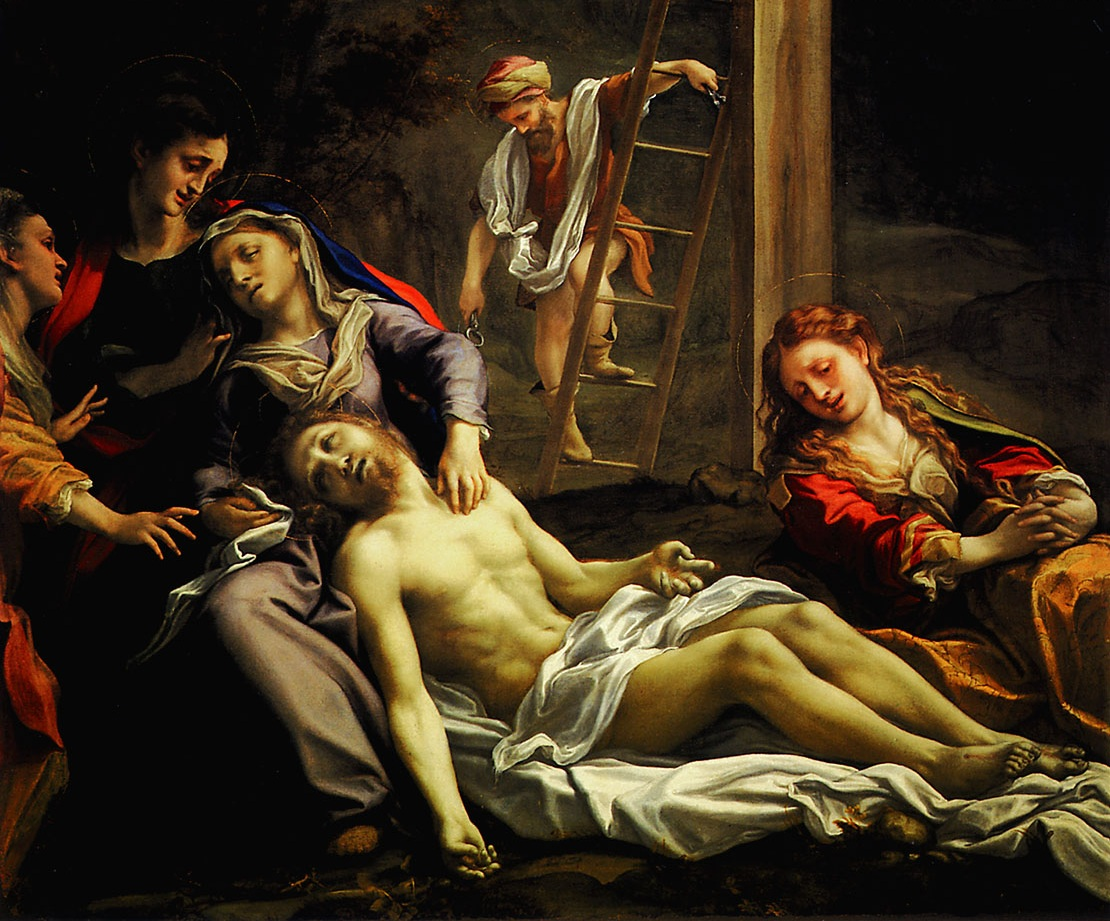
Correggio, Lamentation, ca.1524, Parma, Galleria nazionale

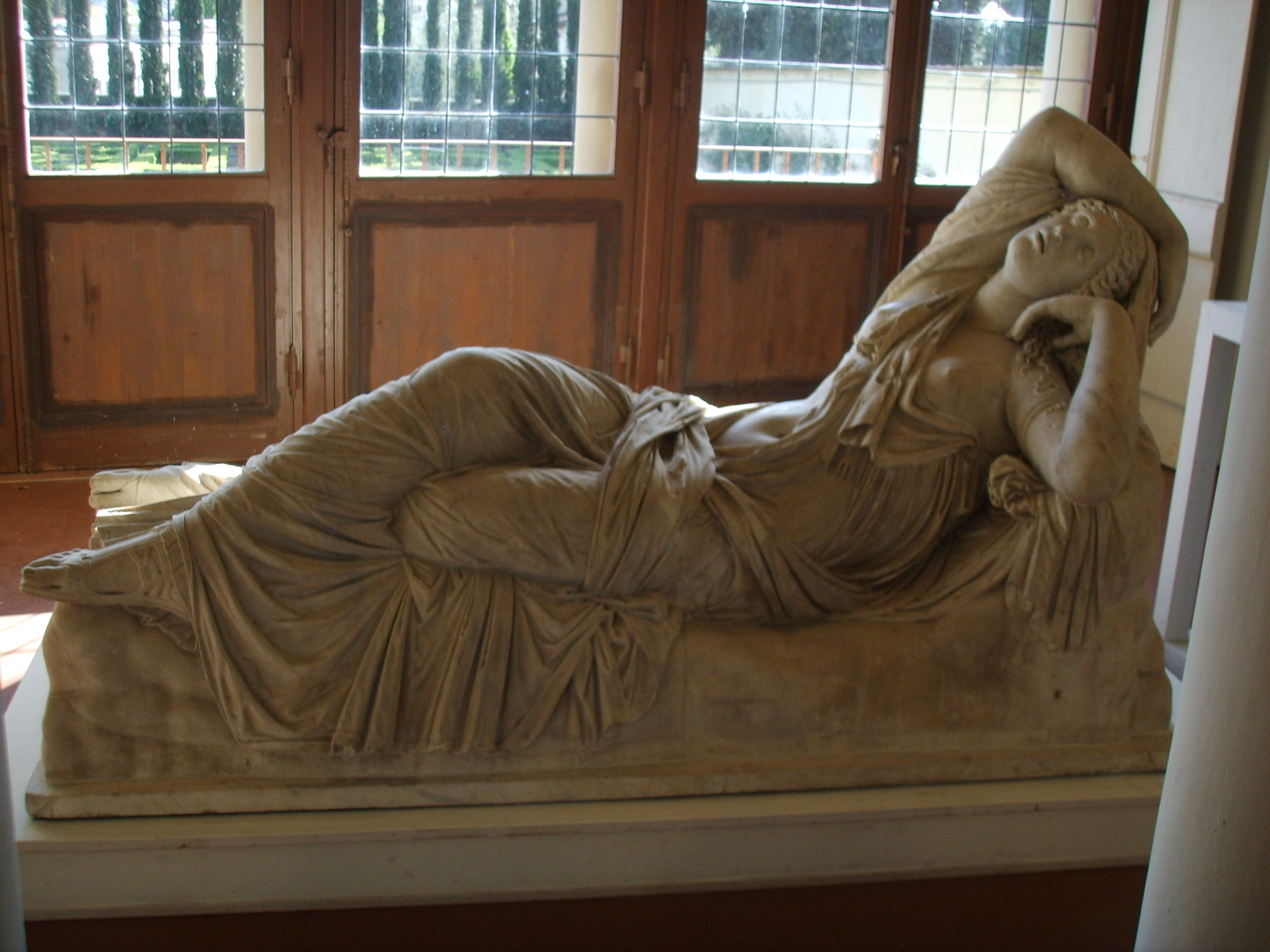
Sleeping Ariadne, 3rd century AD, Florence, Uffizi

Pietà with Two Angels is an oil on copper painting by the Italian Baroque painter Annibale Carracci, created c. 1603, now in the Kunsthistorisches Museum in Vienna.

A letter by the doctor and art lover Giulio Mancini refers to his receiving a painting directly from Annibale Carracci as a reward for medical treatment in 1607, at which time the painter was also affected by the illness which led to his death soon afterwards. This is often identified with the Vienna work, which for stylistic reasons is dated to 1603. If that identification is accepted, it can further be deduced that Annibale had painted the work for himself rather than as a direct commission and was given to the doctor in gratitude or since he had no other way to pay his medical bills.

The first definite mention of the work dates to 1659 and it appears below the large landscapes at the centre of David Teniers the Younger's Gallery of Archduke Leopold William in Brussels, which reproduces the most famous works in that collection, mostly by Italian painters and gathered by Archduke Leopold William whilst governor in Brussels and later taken to Vienna.

== Description and style ==
To the homage to the Lamentation by Correggio – a work cited many times by Annibale, practically throughout his entire artistic career – is added the classical reference deriving from the statue of the Sleeping Ariadne, now in the Uffizi, but once in Rome at the Villa dei Medici on the Pincio. From this sculpture – already cited by Annibale in the Sleeping Venus with Cupids, executed in 1602 – the reclining position of Christ's head and the expression of abandonment on his face probably derive.

The dead Jesus lies on the ground, stretched out on a shroud, his shoulders and head resting on the lap of Mary, who has fainted from grief. Two cherubs support the Virgin and weep in despair. The scene is set against a brown background (the tomb where Christ is about to be buried), interrupted only by a brief glimpse of a landscape similar to the lunette of the Landscape with the Flight into Egypt, painted by Annibale for the Palazzo Aldobrandini. On the tombstone there are some instruments of the "Passion", the nails and the crown of thorns, still soaked in Jesus' blood.

This composition demonstrates Annibale's ability to construct a monumental scene despite the small size of the painting.

Evidence of the appreciation of the small Viennese Pietà is provided by both the copies and the engravings that were made of it. Among the former, the best is believed to be the one in a private collection, attributed to Annibale's circle (between Lanfranco and Badalocchio), while of the three known engravings, those by Frans van der Steen and Cornelis Caukercken are noteworthy.

Annibale himself would return to the theme shortly afterwards with a painting, the Pietà with the three Maries, which has many similarities with the copper in the Kunsthistorische Museum.
