= Pietà with Saints Clare, Francis and Mary Magdalene =

Painting by Annibale Carracci

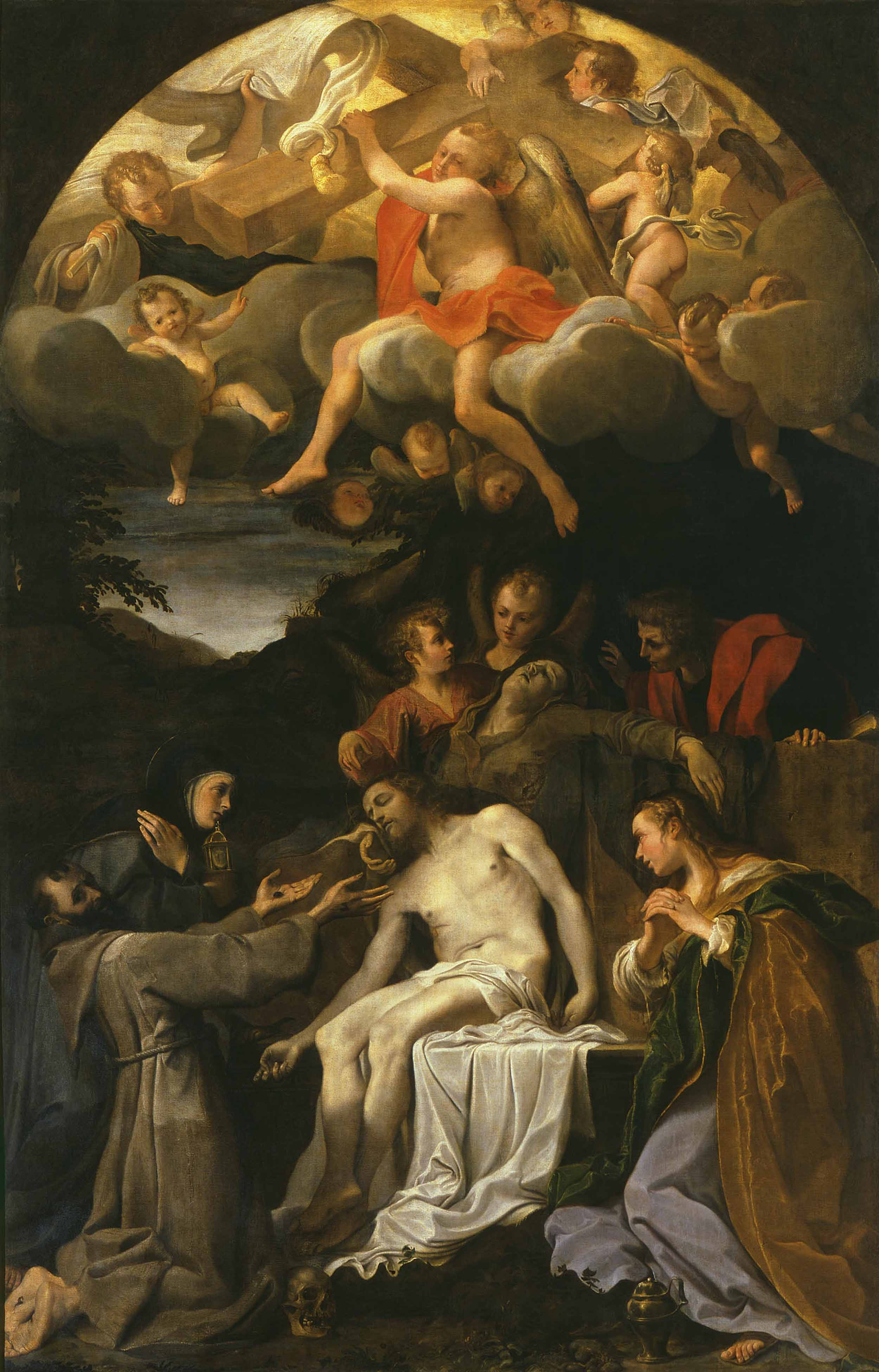
Pietà with Saints Clare, Francis and Mary Magdalene (1585) by Annibale Carracci

Pietà with Saints Clare, Francis and Mary Magdalene is a 1585 oil-on-canvas painting by the Italian Baroque painter Annibale Carracci, now in the Galleria nazionale di Parma.

It was produced for the high altar of the Capuchin church in Parma as one of the artist's first works outside Bologna. The commission may have been linked to the Farnese family, which had a fundamental role in the artist's future career. The family had backed the Capuchins in establishing friaries in Parma and Piacenza and in the 1570s duke Ottavio Farnese assigned them the now-destroyed churches Santa Maria Maddalena in Parma and San Bernardino in Piacenza, having financed the rebuilding of both.

The painting was praised in all the historic sources on Annibale, such as Francesco Scannelli's Il microcosmo della pittura (1657), Carlo Cesare Malvasia's Felsina Pittrice (1678), and Giovanni Pietro Bellori's Vite de' pittori, scultori e architetti moderni (1672). Bellori also refers to Federico Zuccari's praise for the work. The Napoleonic regime confiscated the work in 1799 and it was only returned to Parma in 1815, entering the Galleria later that year. It was restored for the 1956 Carracci exhibition in Bologna, revealing the date 1585 in Arabic numerals on the stone under Christ's right hand, confirming the date proposed by art historian Hermann Voss.

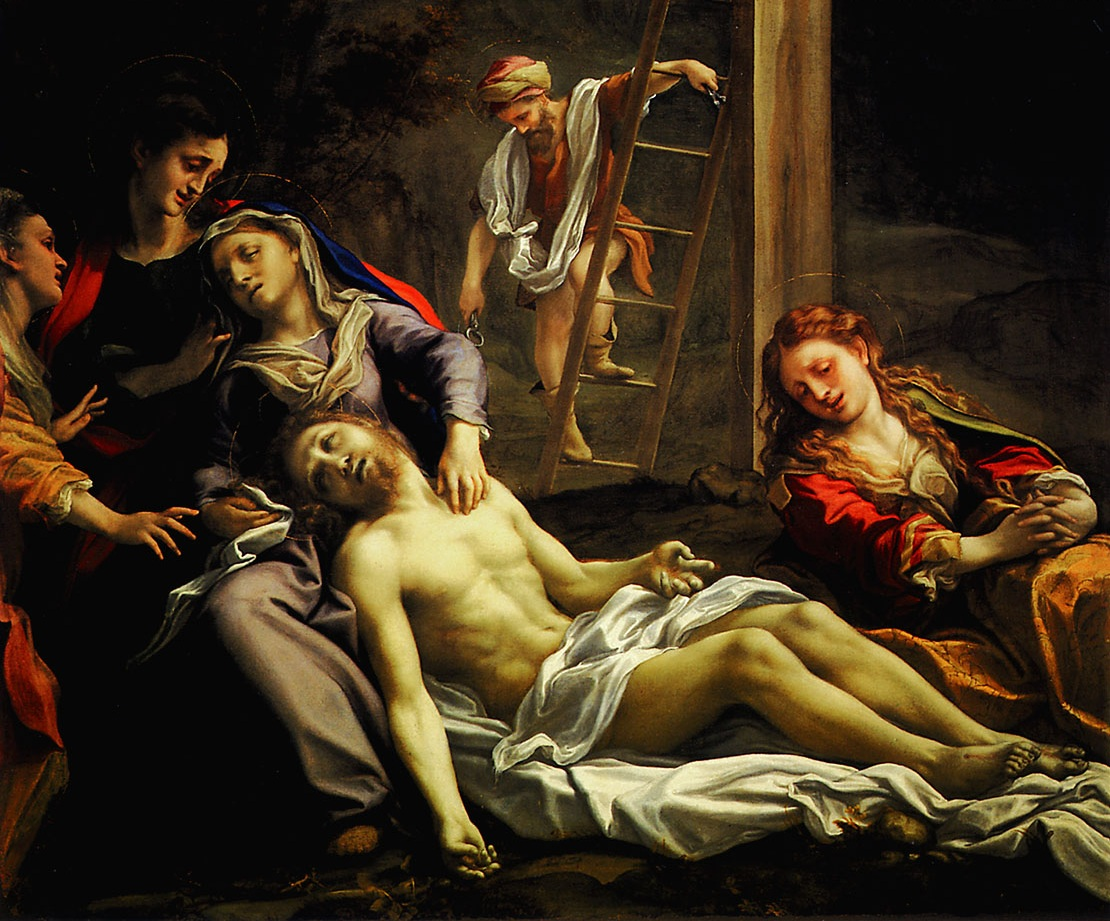
Correggio, Lamentation, circa 1524, Galleria nazionale di Parma

The main figures of the scene and the two angels who support the Virgin are arranged as if to compose a sort of "tableau vivant" around the lifeless body of Christ, seated on the base of the tomb and with his head abandoned on the knees of his mother, who lies unconscious behind him.

On the right, in the foreground, there is the Magdalene, a figure that alludes to the dedication of the church where the painting was originally located. The presence on the left of Francis and Clare of Assisi refers to the devotion for these saints by the Capuchins, who commissioned the work.

In the upper part of the altarpiece there is a glimpse of paradise, from which angelic figures descend carrying the cross, symbol of Christ's victory over sin, and the white cloth announcing his imminent Resurrection.

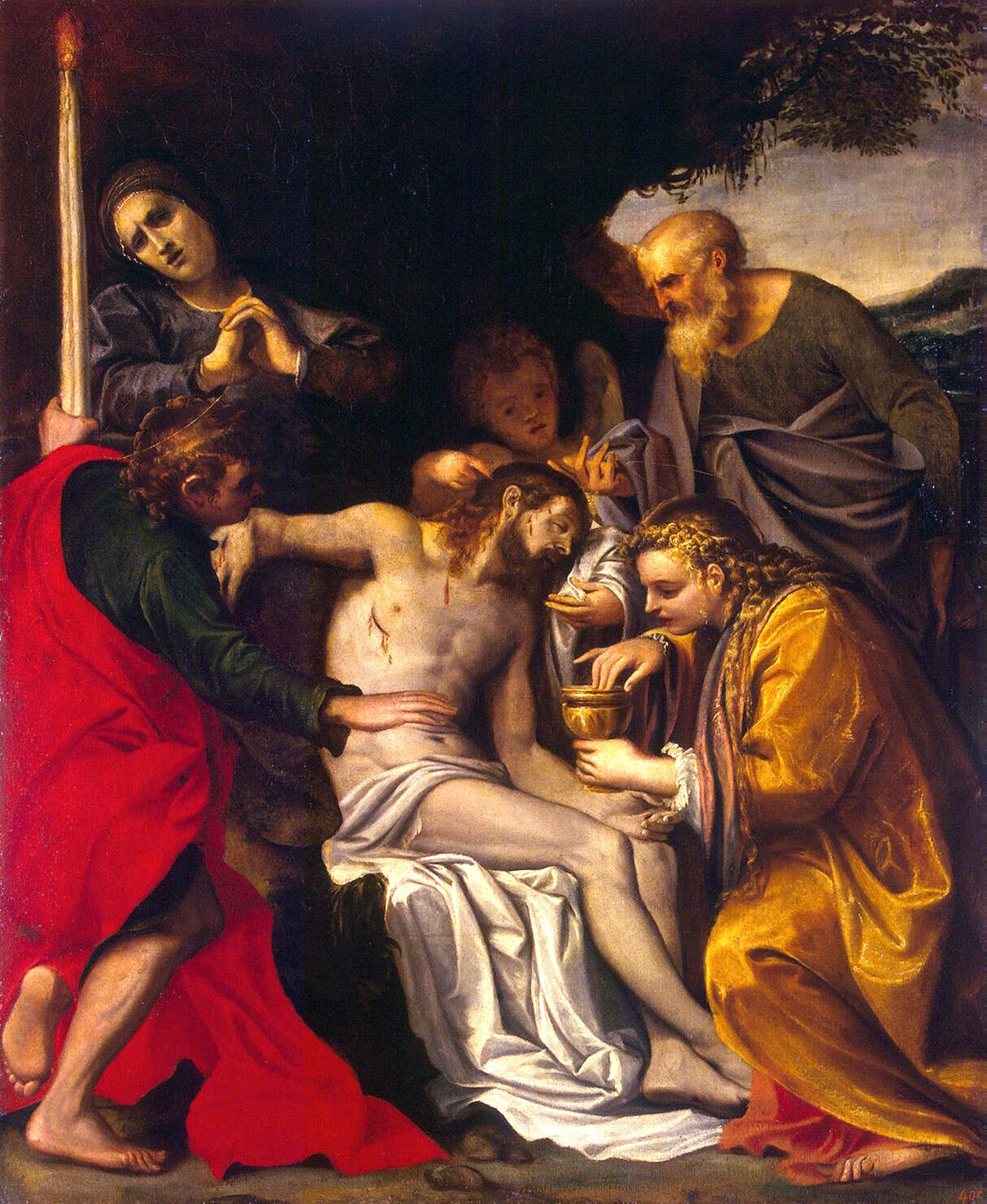
Agostino Carracci, Pietà with saints, ca. 1586, Saint Petersburg, Hermitage

As already noted by Bellori, the work, like the contemporary Baptism in Bologna, marks one of Annibale's first explicit tributes to the work of Correggio.

In the Pietà made for the Capuchins, in fact, the exuberance of the angels and the dense, floating clouds capable of supporting and enveloping them closely evoke the frescoes of the dome of the Cathedral of Parma and the altarpiece of the Madonna della Scodella.

Furthermore, in this work, Annibale engages for the first time with Correggio's "Lamentation", a painting that will constitute a constant point of reference for the most famous of the Carraccis, cited several times in the following years, both in paintings and in engravings.

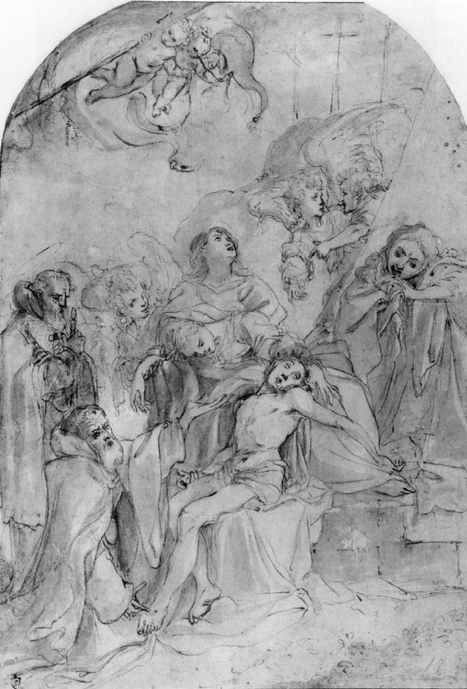
Ludovico Carracci, Pietà, ca. 1585, Copenaghen, Statens Museum for Kunst

The references to Correggio are so evident that it seems plausible that the painting was executed directly in Parma, under the direct influence of the Renaissance master.

Contemporary critics have described the work as one of the most innovative of its time, already seeing in it some signs of proto-baroque style: Andrea Emiliani, for example, defined the Parma Pietà as "the most modern painting in Europe", while Eugenio Riccomini says the painting manifests "a new Christian epic".

The Hermitage Museum houses a Pietà with Saints, attributed to Agostino Carracci, very similar to the Parma work by Annibale, which in the past was assigned to the latter.

A preparatory study by Annibale for the Parma altarpiece, depicting the Christ in Pietà, is in the Cabinet of Drawings and Prints of the Uffizi.

Recent studies have also linked the Parma painting to three further drawings, all attributed to Ludovico Carracci (respectively preserved at the Christ Church Picture Gallery in Oxford, the Nationalmuseum in Stockholm and the Statens Museum for Kunst in Copenhagen, the latter being the closest of the three to the canvas in the Gallery).

It has been deduced that Annibale may have enjoyed, for this important debut outside Bologna, the help of his more experienced and older cousin. In any case, the youngest of the Carraccis would have partially distanced himself, in the final execution, from Ludovico's suggestions to embrace a more decidedly Correggio-like style.

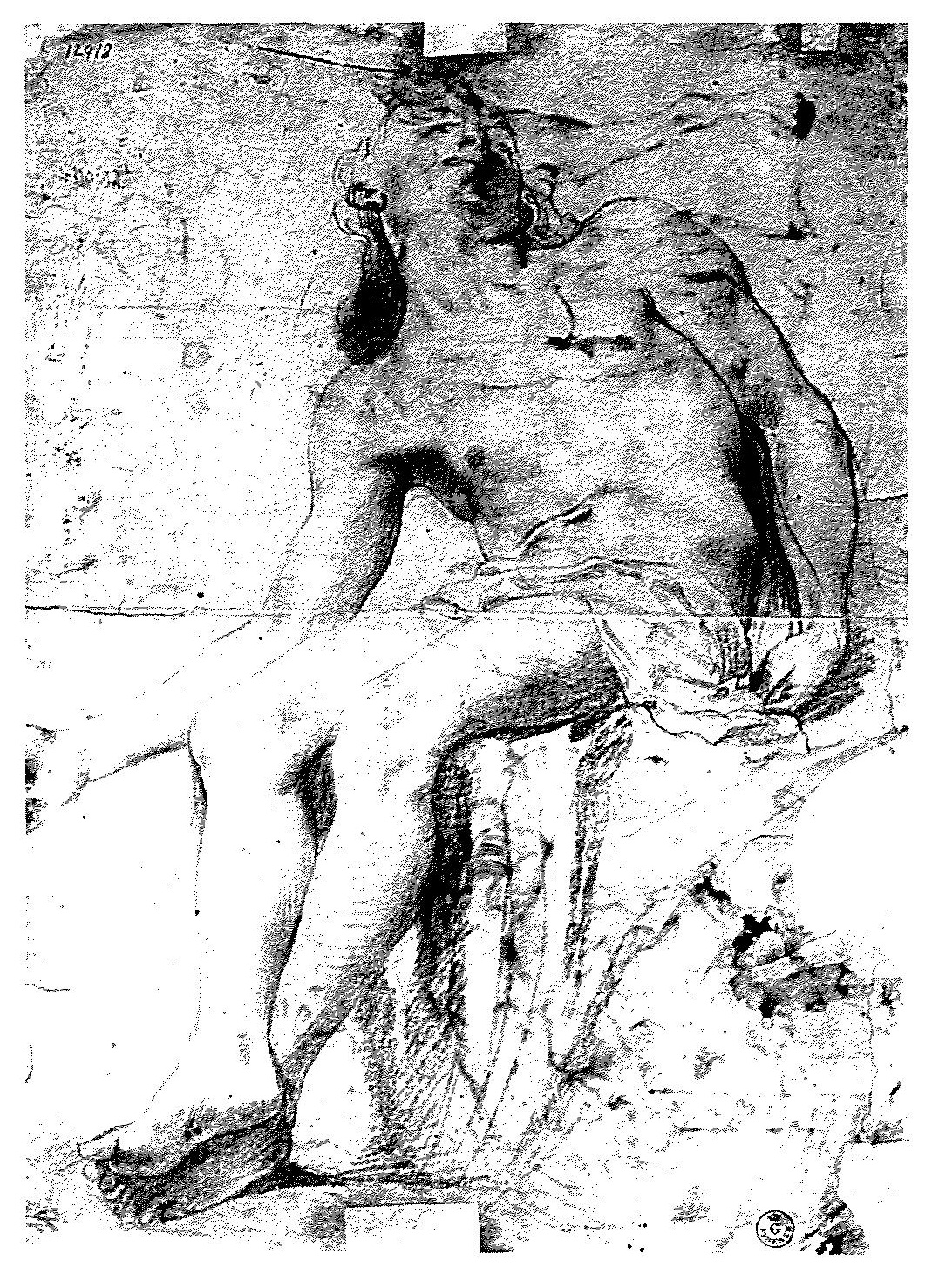
The study in the Uffizi

== Bibliography (in Italian) ==
- Corrado Ricci, La Regia Galleria di Parma, Parma, 1896
- Angela Ghilardi, Scheda dell'opera; in Lucia Fornari Schianchi (a cura di) Galleria Nazionale di Parma. Catalogo delle opere, il Cinquecento, Milano, 1998
- Eugenio Riccomini, Dopo Correggio: appunti sulla pittura a Parma dal Correggio ad Annibale Carracci, in Emilian Painting of the 16th and 17th Centuries, Bologna, 1987
- Lucia Fornari Schianchi, Come si forma un museo: il caso della Galleria Nazionale di Parma; in Fornari Schianchi (a cura di), Galleria Nazionale di Parma. Catalogo delle opere dall'Antico al Cinquecento, Milano, 1997
- Alberto Crispo, L'arte nelle chiese e nei conventi cappuccini del ducato farnesiano, in I cappuccini in Emilia Romagna. Storia di una presenza, a cura di Pozzi e Prodi, Bologna 2002, pp. 410–434
- Daniele Benati, scheda dell'opera nel catalogo a cura di D. Benati ed E. Riccomini Annibale Carracci, Electa, Milano, 2007, pp. 174–175.
