= Pietà (Annibale Carracci) =

c. 1600 painting by Annibale Carracci

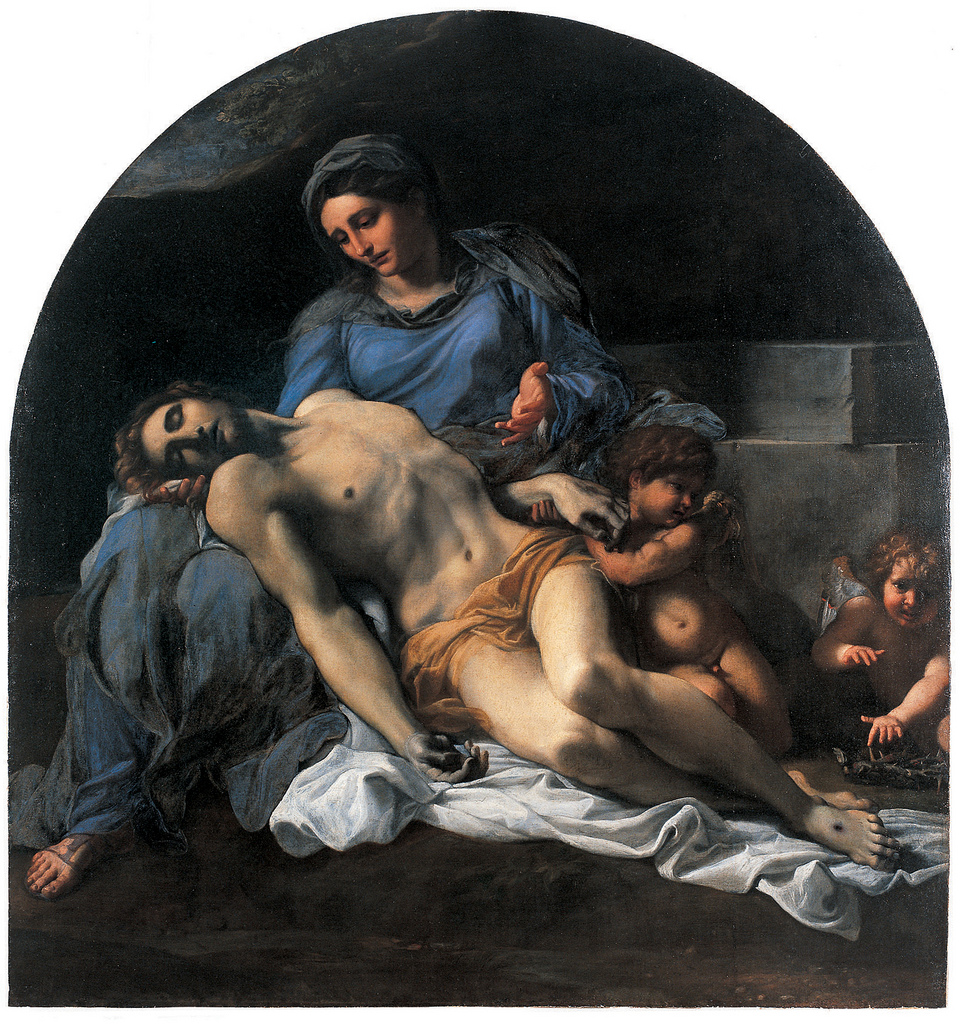
- Artist: Annibale Carracci
- Year: c. 1600
- Dimensions: 156 cm × 149 cm (61 in × 59 in)
- Location: Museo di Capodimonte, Naples

Pietà is a c. 1600 oil on canvas painting by the Italian painter Annibale Carracci, which was commissioned by Odoardo Farnese. It moved from Rome to Parma to Naples as part of the Farnese collection and is now in the National Museum of Capodimonte in Naples. It is one of many 16th-century Bolognese paintings dedicated to the theme of the Pietà, and it is counted among Carracci's masterpieces.

== History ==
The dating of this painting is owed to records of its commission by Odoardo Farnese. It is unknown, however, what its original destination was or the date of its execution.

For its location, the format of the painting indicates that it might have been intended for the private devotion of its commissioner. Therefore, it would have been kept at the chapel of the Palazzo Farnese in Rome or another Farnese mansion. There is a 16th-century traveler's account that refers to an admirable Pietà by Carracci, seen in the Palazzo Farnese of Caprarola. It is unknown, however, whether that refers to the Pietà now in Naples or another work. For stylistic reasons, the Naples Pietà is dated to between 1598 and 1600.

Like almost all the works in the Farnese Collection, Carracci's Pietà left from Rome to Parma and was then brought to its new location in Naples, where it is today.

The numberless copies and derivations of this painting established it as a canonical representation of the Pietà in the Baroque era.

== Description and style ==
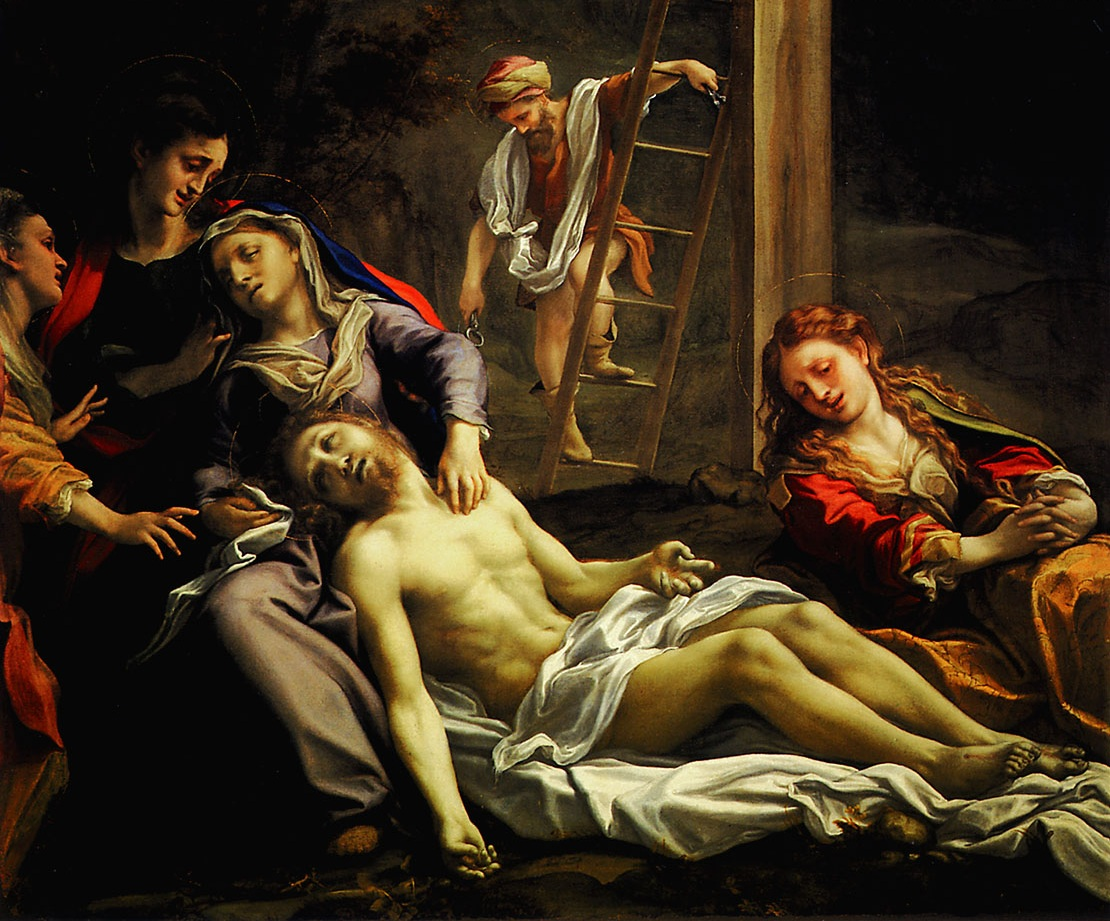
Lamentation of Correggio, c. 1524

The Pietà of Carracci undoubtedly references Michelangelo's celebrated Pietà statue. Three preliminary studies of Carracci's Pietà reflect the observations of Carracci on Michelangelo's statue and the way in which he recreated it. In the first drawings, the body of Christ is positioned more similarly to the Michelangelo statue, with the difference that the body is not placed in the lap of Marie but on the tomb. The Virgin Marie is instead kneeling beside Jesus.

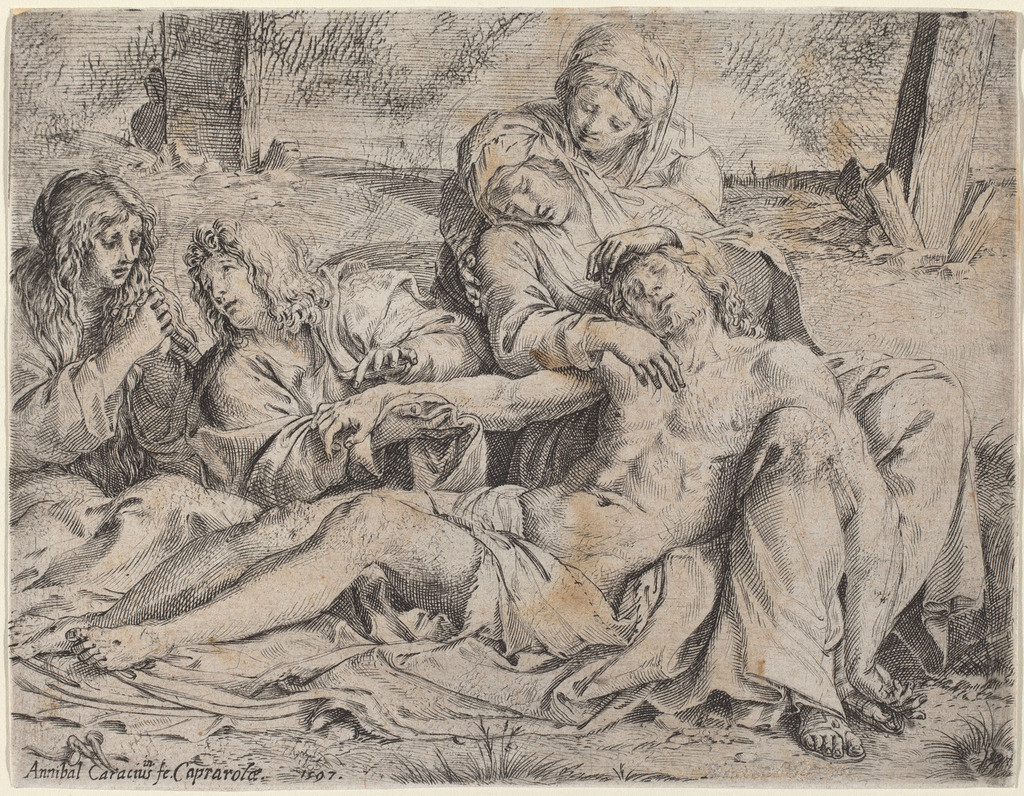
Pietà di Caprarola by Annibale Carracci, 1597

In the last version, the composition changed; it looks more like the final painting: the body of Christ is placed so his shoulders and legs are in Marie's lap, which creates an intimate link between them in a way reminiscent of Michelangelo's Pietà. Marie is, however, seated on the earth (and not on a throne, as in the Vatican statue), and Jesus' legs are on the ground and stretched over a shroud. Those elements are shared with the Lamentation of Correggio. Carracci had studied that work as a young man. He had even revisited that the work only a little before the Farnese commission, which resulted in an engraving Pietà di Caprarola.

The final result is an original combination of its two models. As Michelangelo, Carracci depicted the composed, poignant suffering of Marie, who delicately cradles her son's head in her right hand. Their faces are brought forward by the way Marie leans over the body of Christ.

Also like Michelangelo, Carracci adopted a pyramidal compositional scheme in which he inserted a little angel that holds the left hand of Jesus. A second angel, on the right side of the canvas, pricks its finger on Jesus' crown of thorns. This second angel looks out directly at the viewer and invites, with its expression of adoration, reflection on the suffering of Jesus during the Passion. The left hand of Marie, in a clever foreshortening, presents a gesture of resigned sadness. Even this detail is a homage to the statue of Michelangelo.

The whole group is placed just before the still-open tomb (perhaps an allusion to Jesus' resurrection) and on rough earth. The darkness of night enshrouds Marie, her son, and the angels, which emerge from the shadows thanks to the effects of light and color that pervade the painting. The lights and colors confer on the painting an atmosphere of intimate emotion that also recalls Correggio.

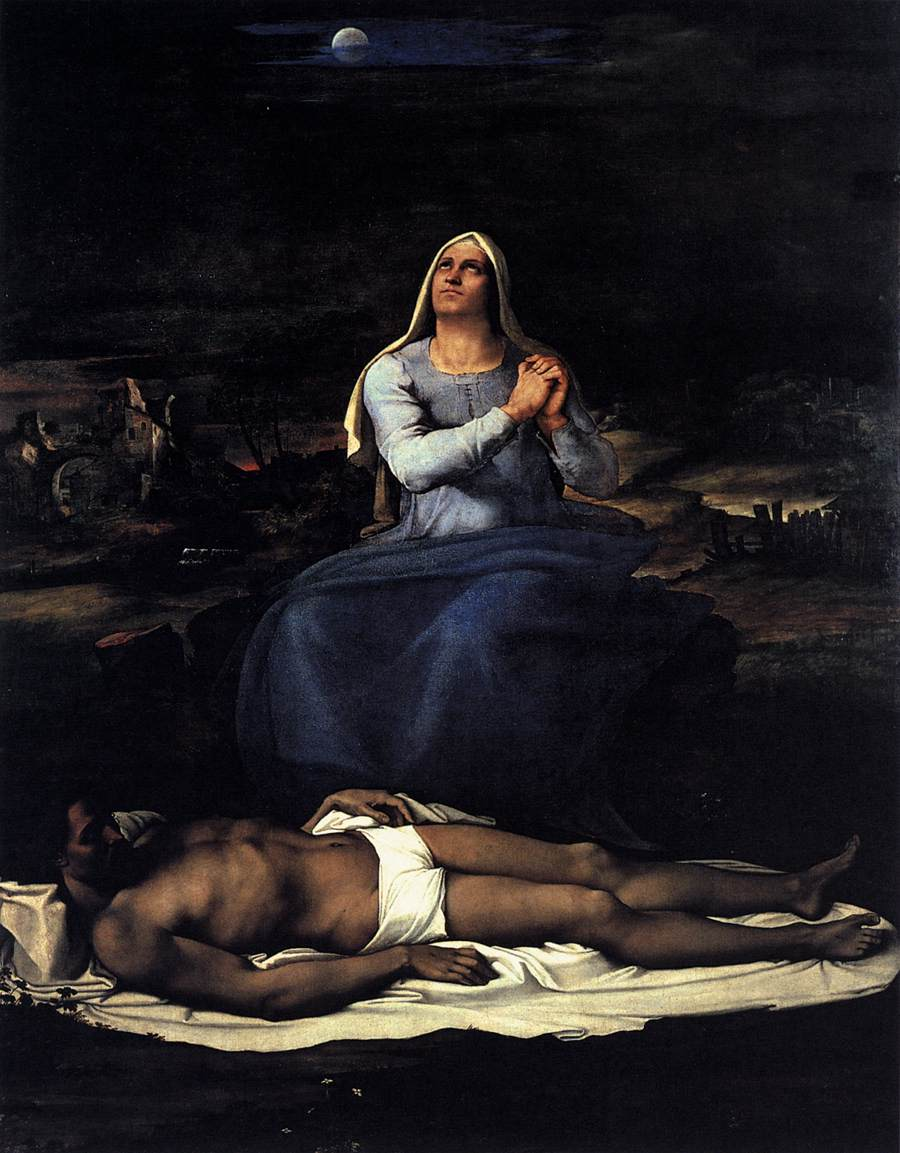
The Viterbo Pietà by Sebastiano del Piombo, c. 1515

The body of Jesus has an Apollonian beauty, on which the wounds of the Passion have just been inflicted. The sculptural vigor of Jesus is associated with the great attention that Carracci gave to classical statuary and the great works of the Roman Renaissance, which are bound to the frescoes of the Galleria Farnese. For this reason, this Pietà is thought to be contemporary to those frescoes.

Sebastiano del Piombo (another specialist on the theme of the Pietà) also influenced the painting. This Venetian painter was well known to Carracci, and several of his works were even possessed by Odoardo Farnese.

== Preparatory drawings ==
The relation of three drawings to Carracci's Pietà was suggested by Rudolf Wittkower, but not placed under further study.

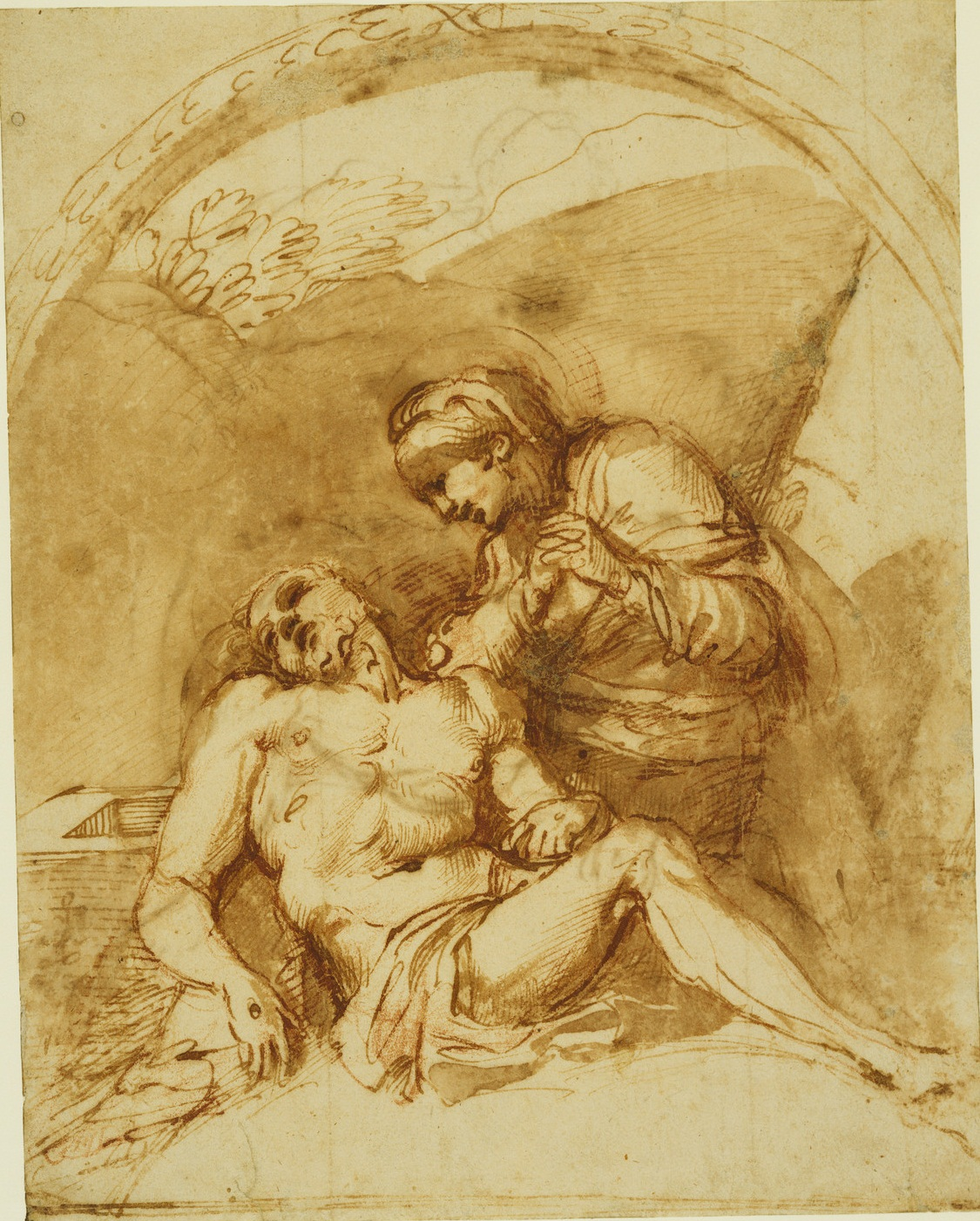
Royal Collection (Windsor Castle)

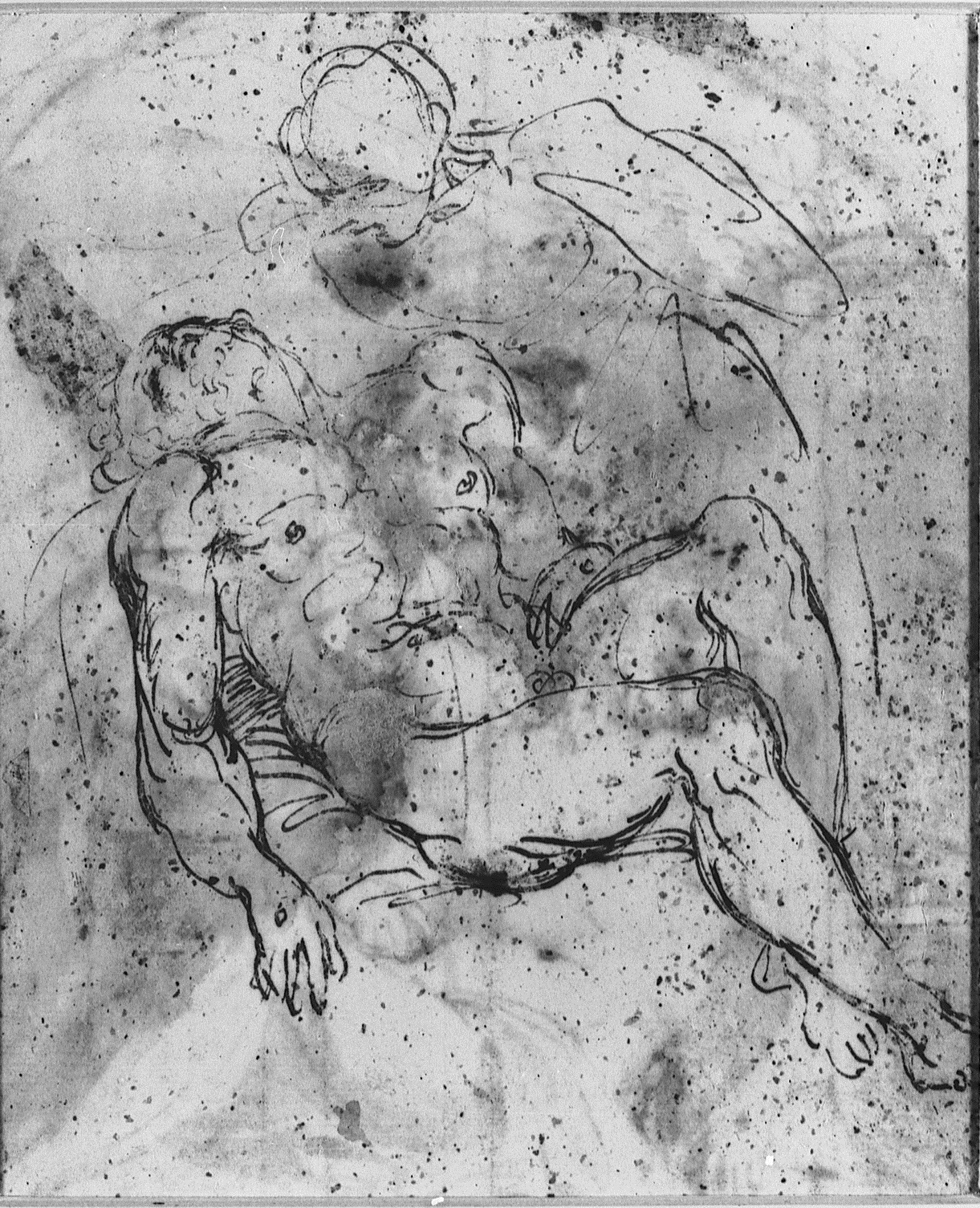
Royal Collection (Windsor Castle)

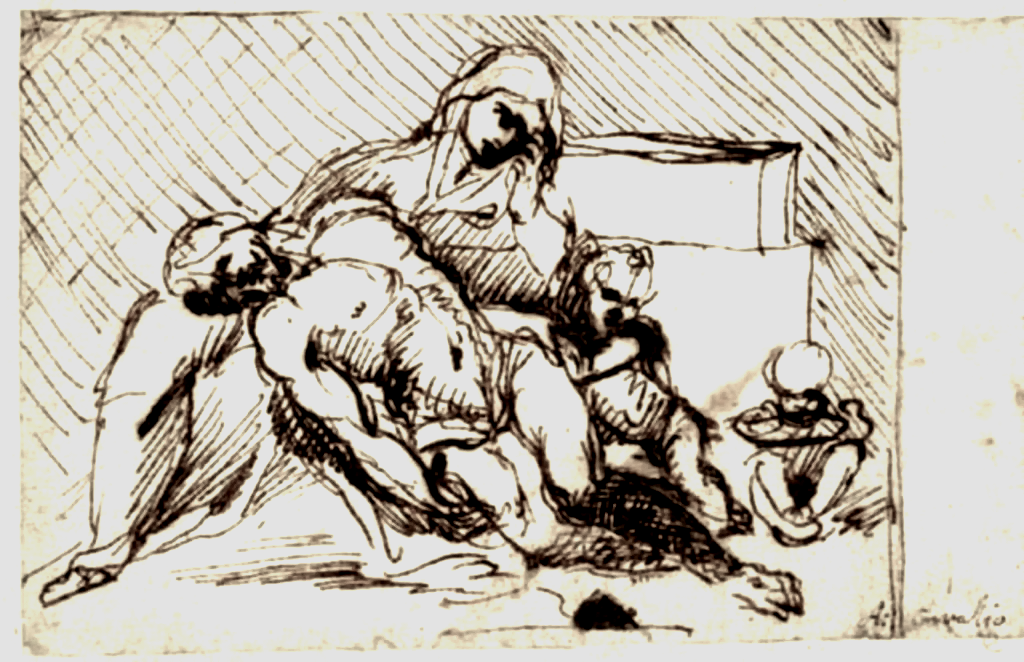
Private Collection

== Influence ==
=== Engravings ===
The great success of Carracci's The Loves of the Gods frescoes in the Farnese Gallery ignited general interest in graphical reproductions of his other works. The Pietà was among the works that attracted attention and were reproduced in engravings in various parts of Europe throughout the 16th century and into the 17th.

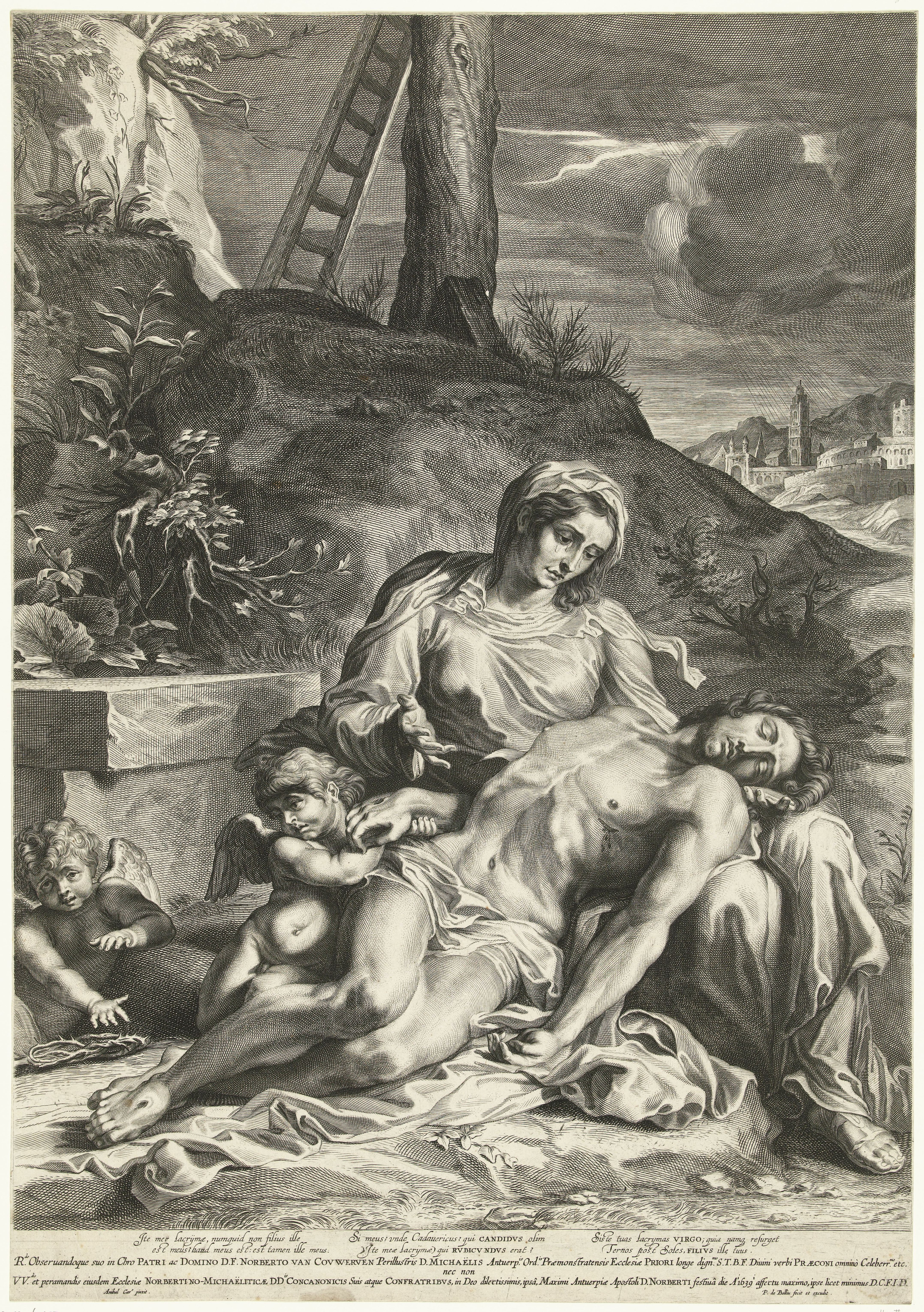
Engraving by Pieter de Bailliu

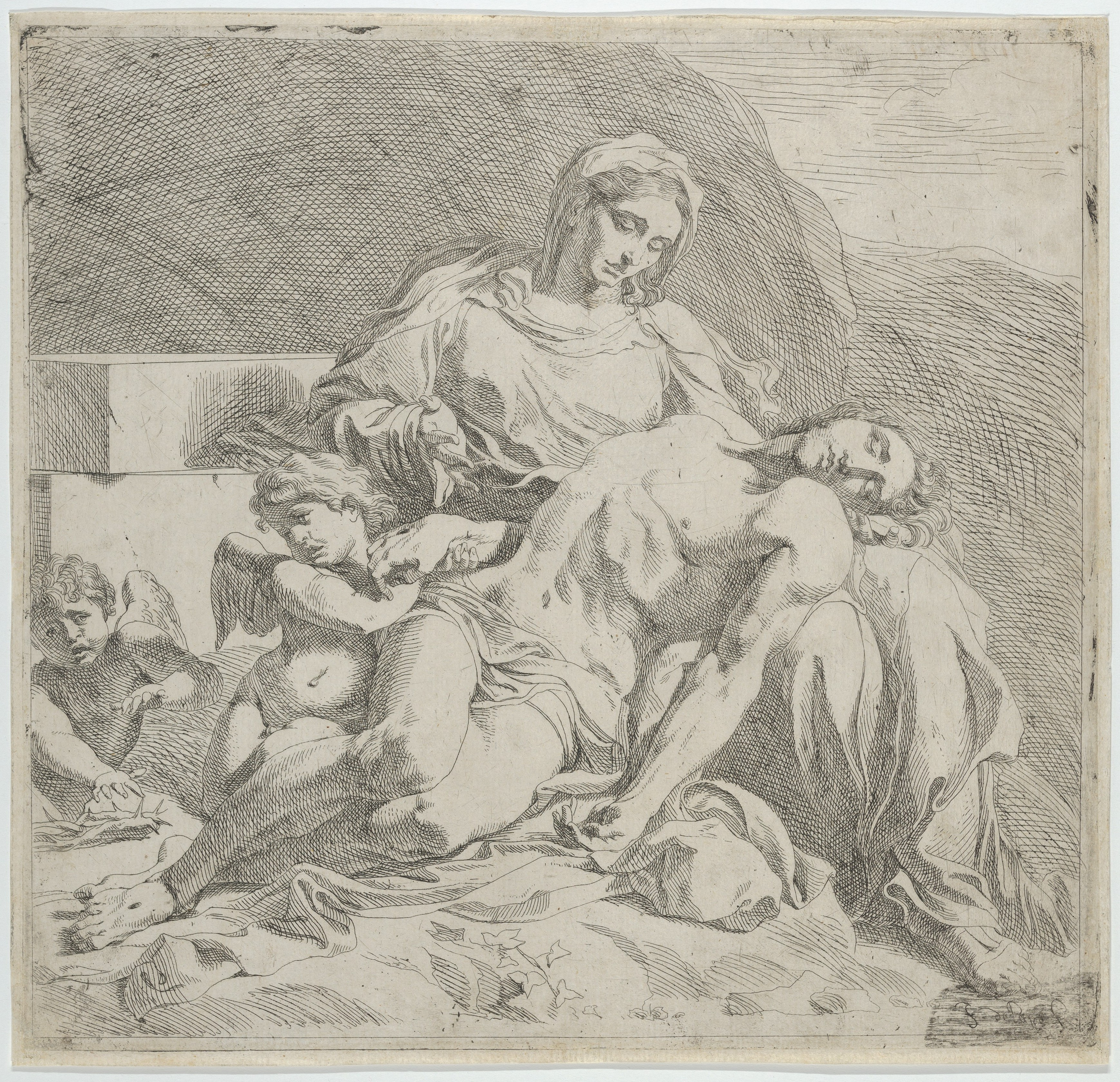
Engraving by Joost de Pape

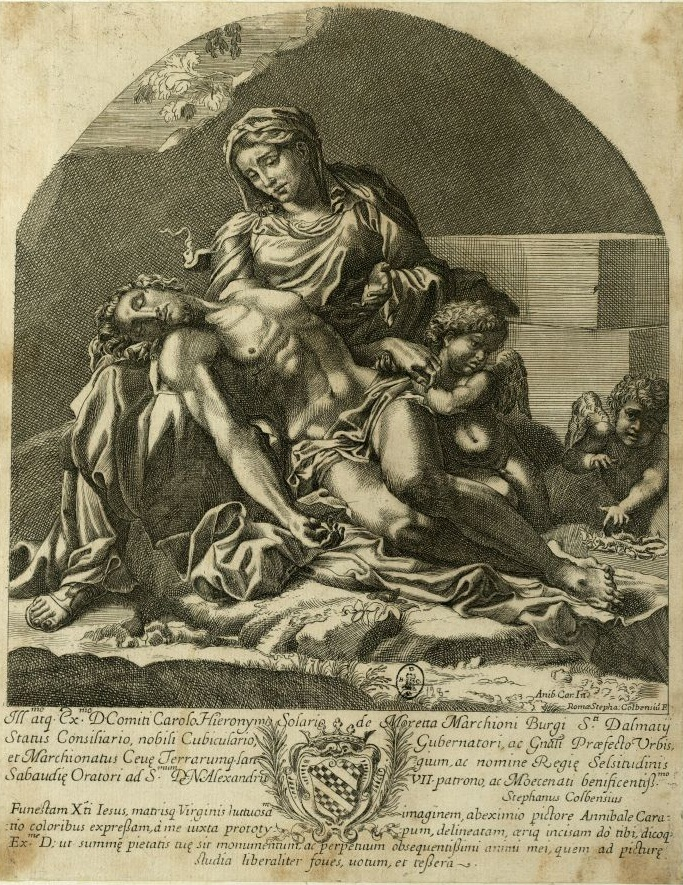
Engraving by Stephan Colbenschlag

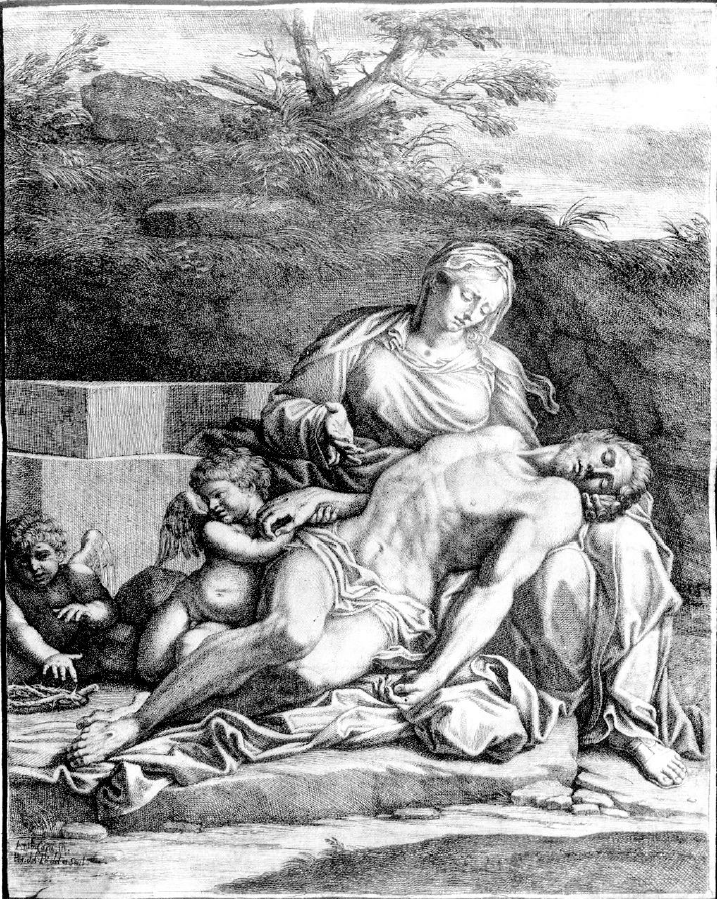
Engraving by Pietro del Pò

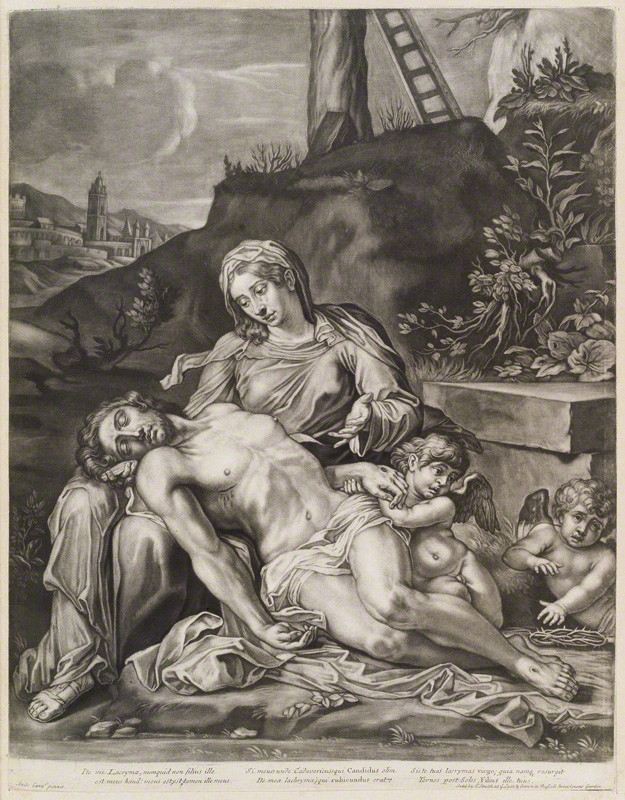
Engraving by Isaac Beckett

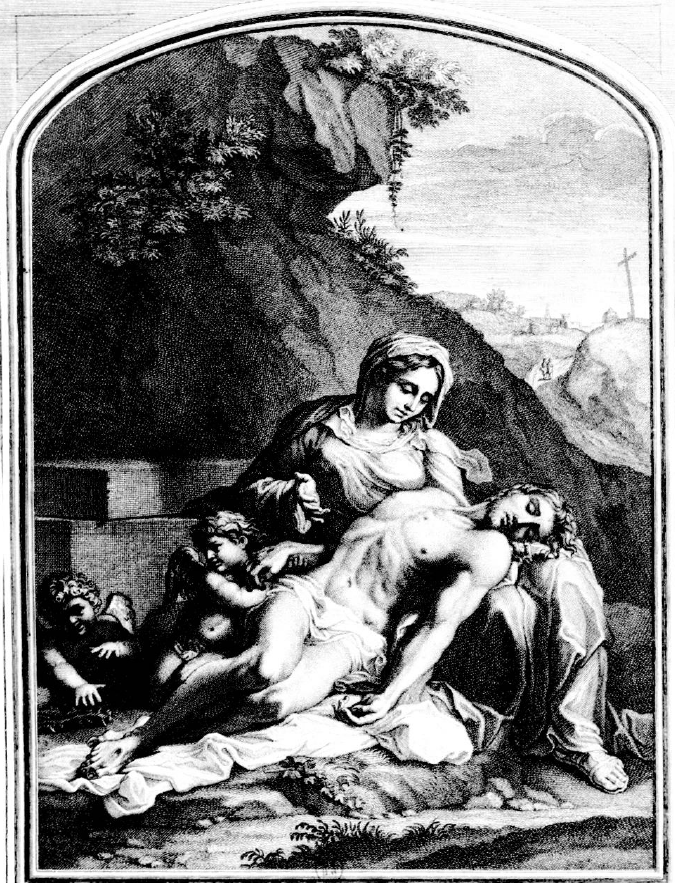
Engraving by Jean-Baptiste Haussard

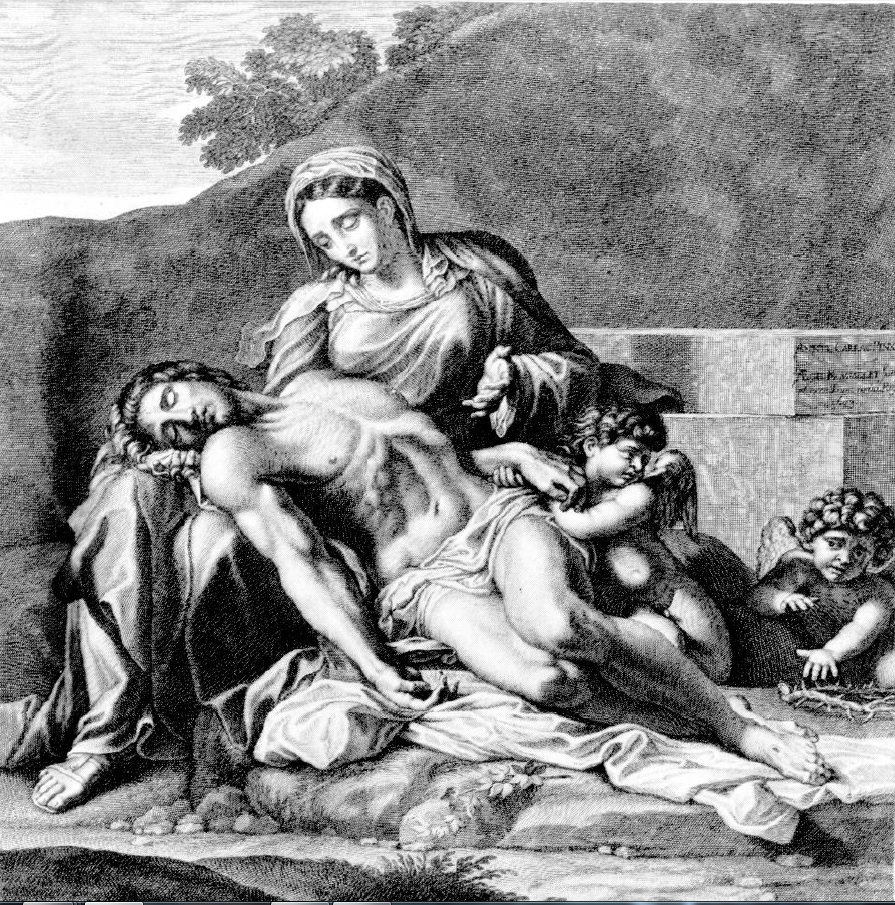
Engraving by Gilles Rousselet

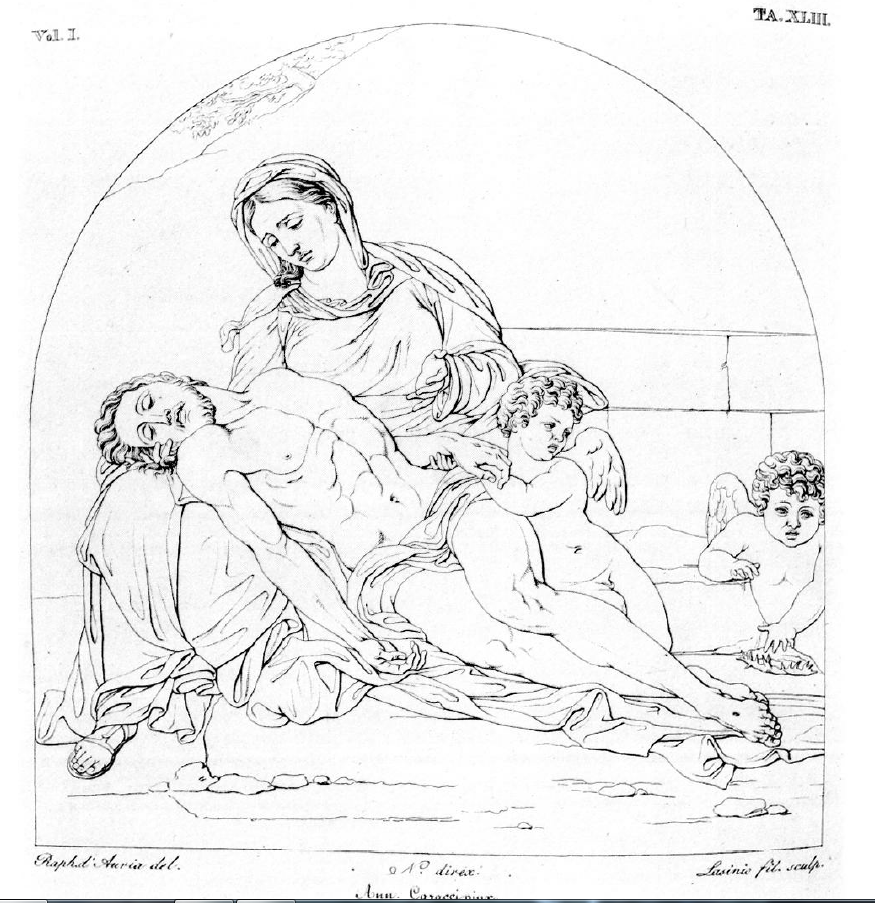
Engraving by Giovanni Paolo Lasinio

=== Copies and derivations ===
The reproductions of the Pieta multiplied, with varying quality. Among the verified copies, the best is that at the Galleria Doria Pamphilj, which was once thought to be an autographed copy by Carracci himself. Worse copies were sometimes made from the engravings of the work, which can be seen in the "controparte", or inverted, composition they sometimes show.

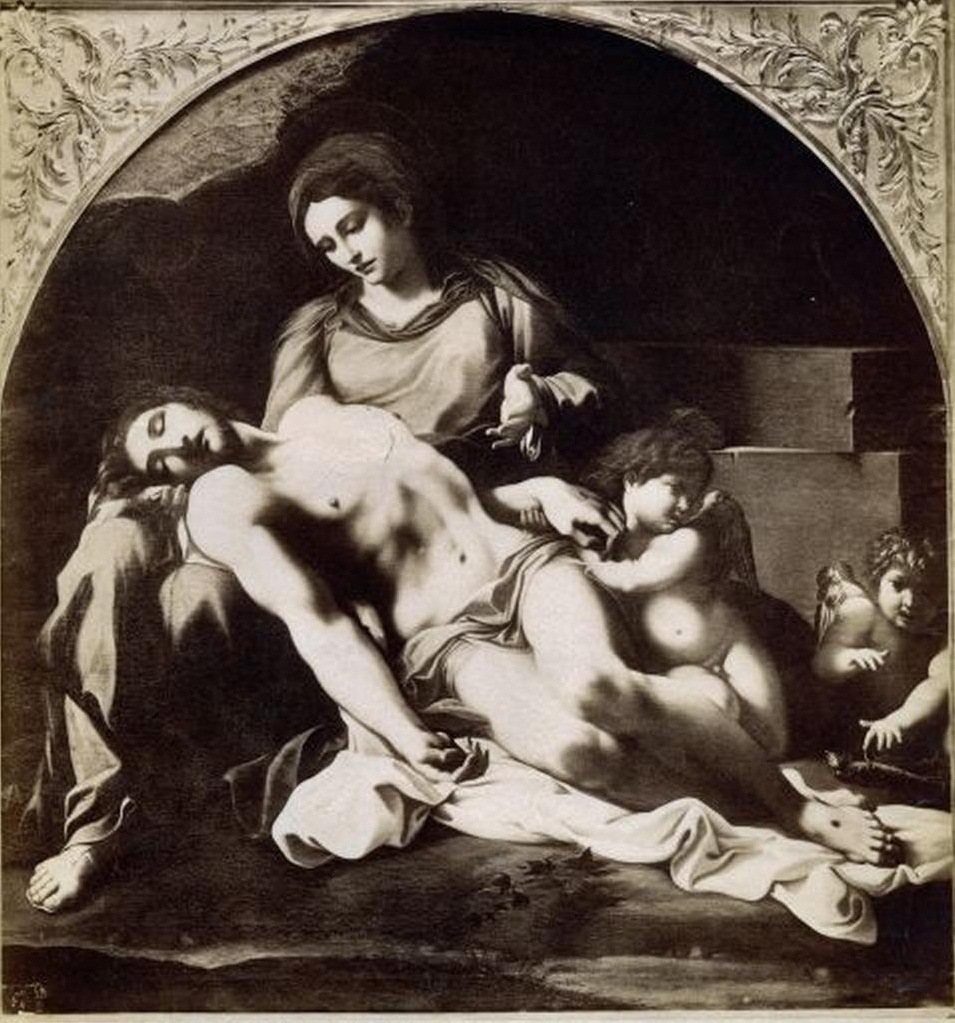
Copy at the Galleria Doria Pamphilj

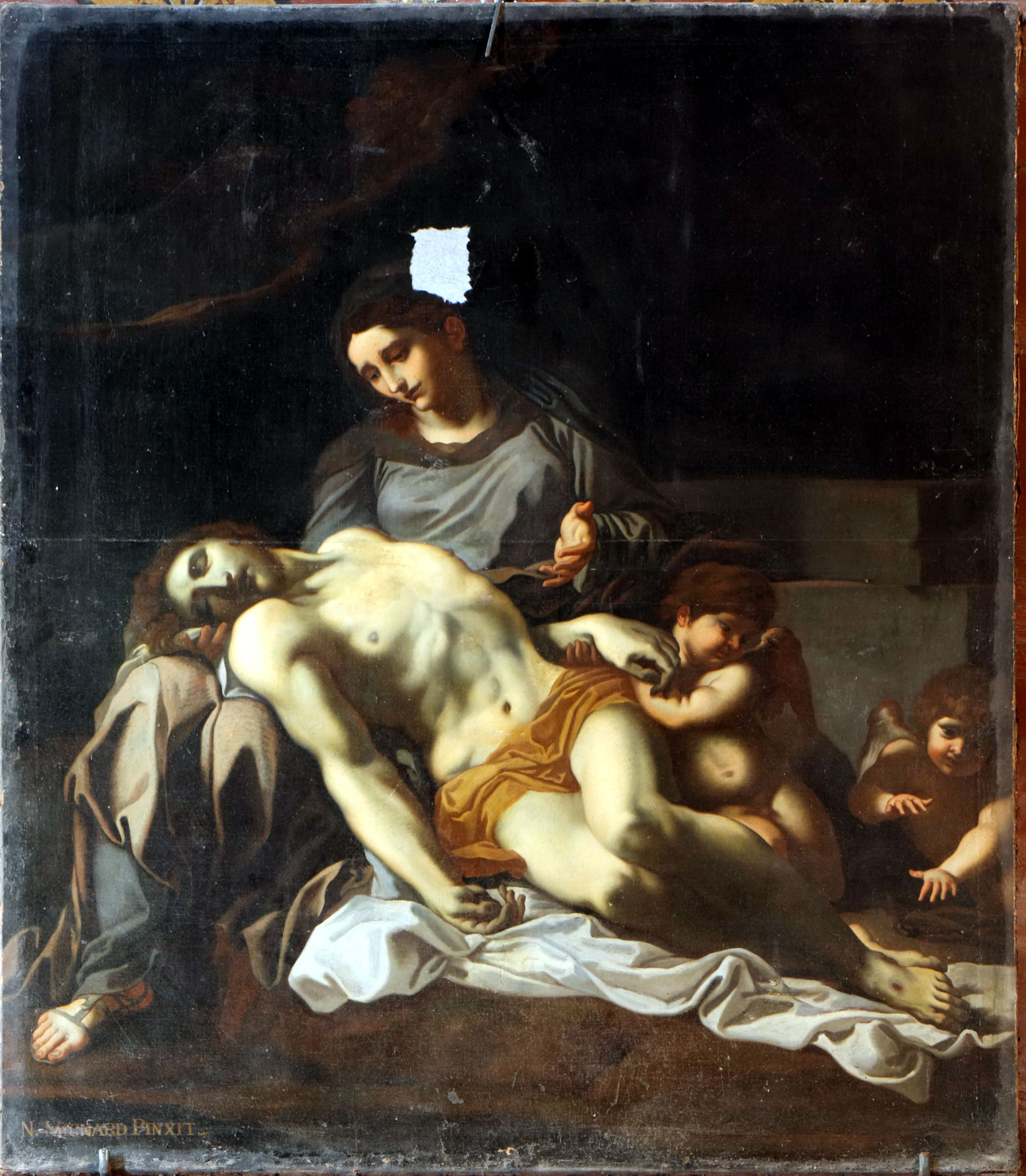
Copy following Nicolas Mignard, Palazzo dei Papi di Avignone

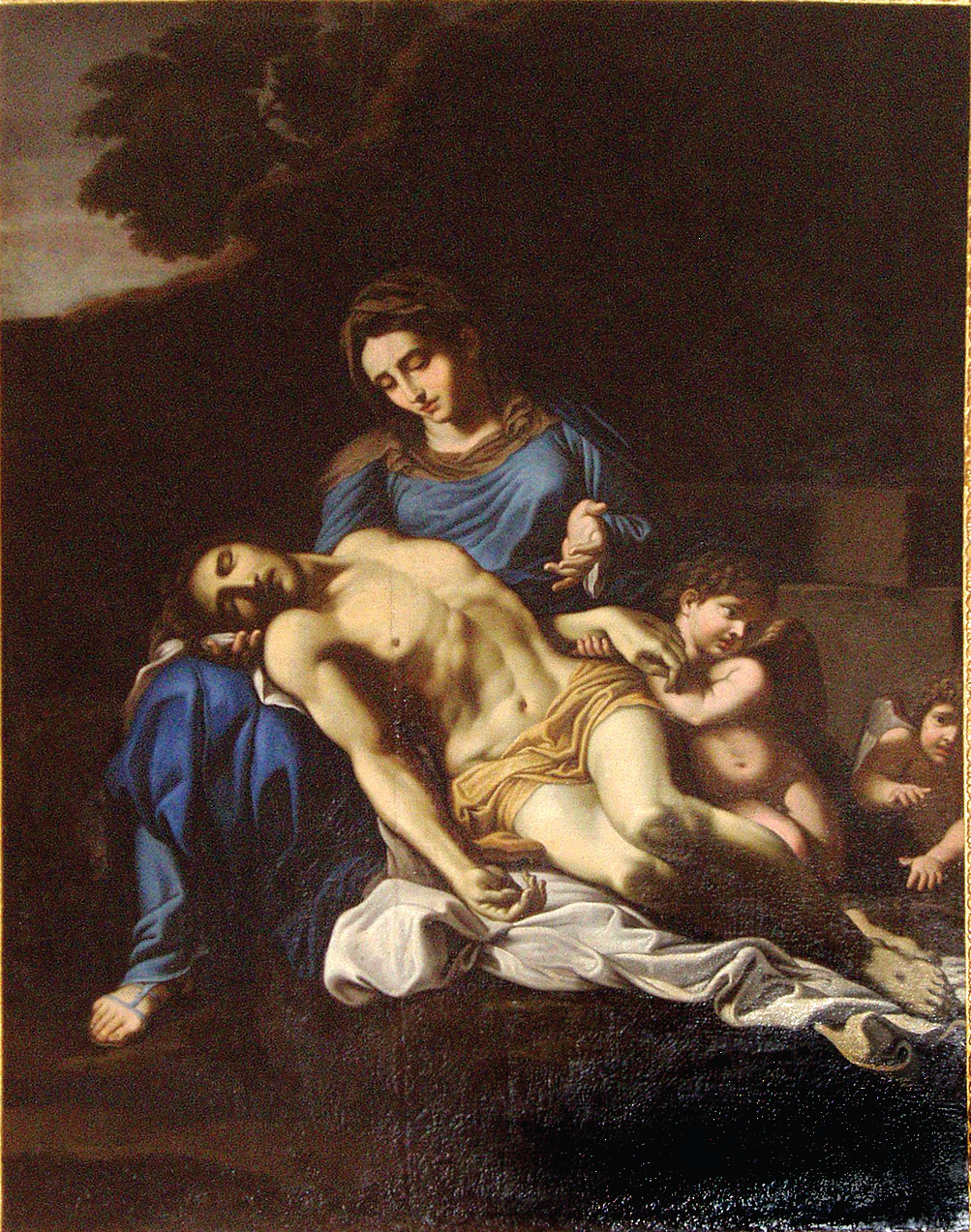
Copy following Pierre Mignard, church of San Nicola, Marignane

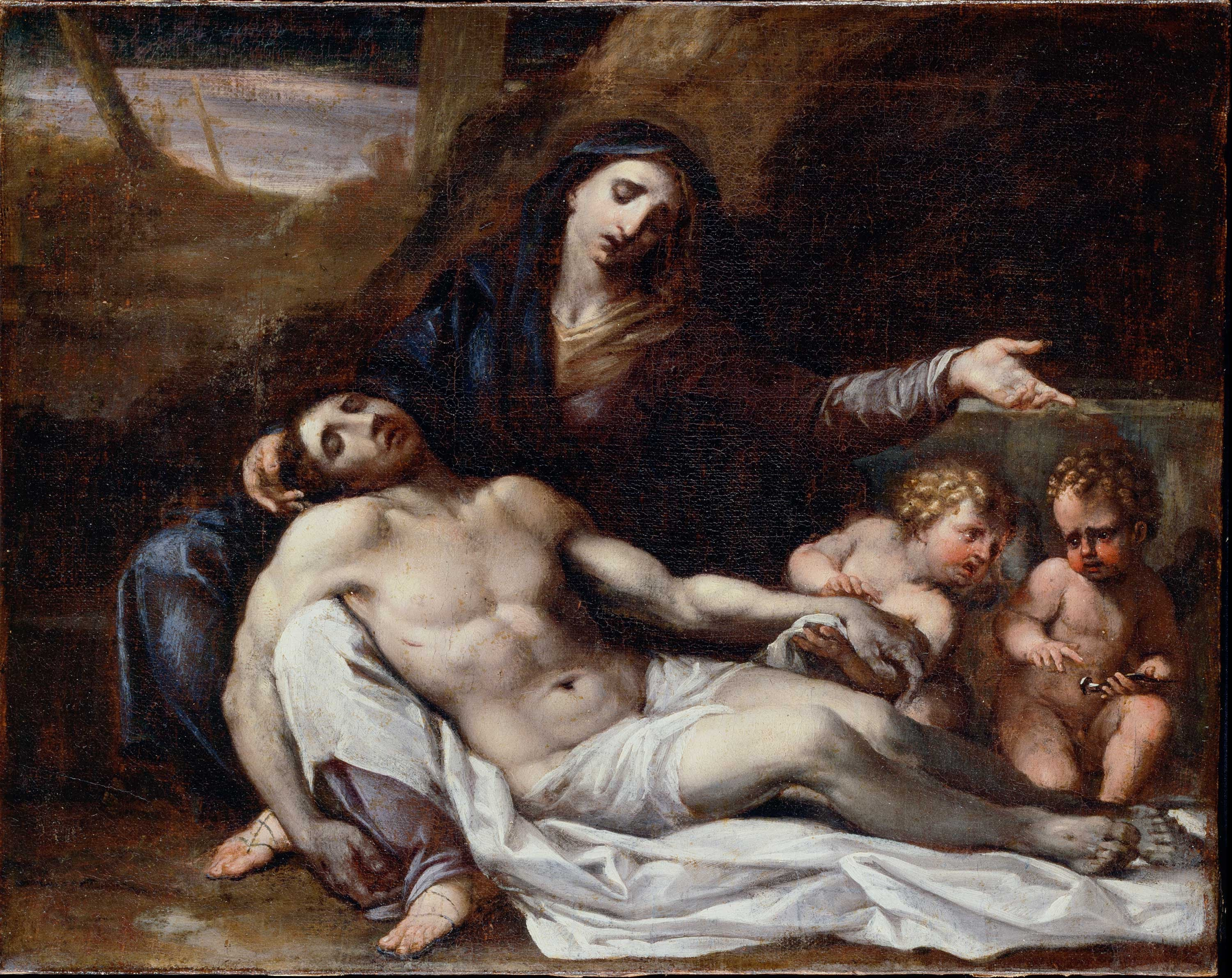
Copy with variations, at the Dulwich Picture Gallery

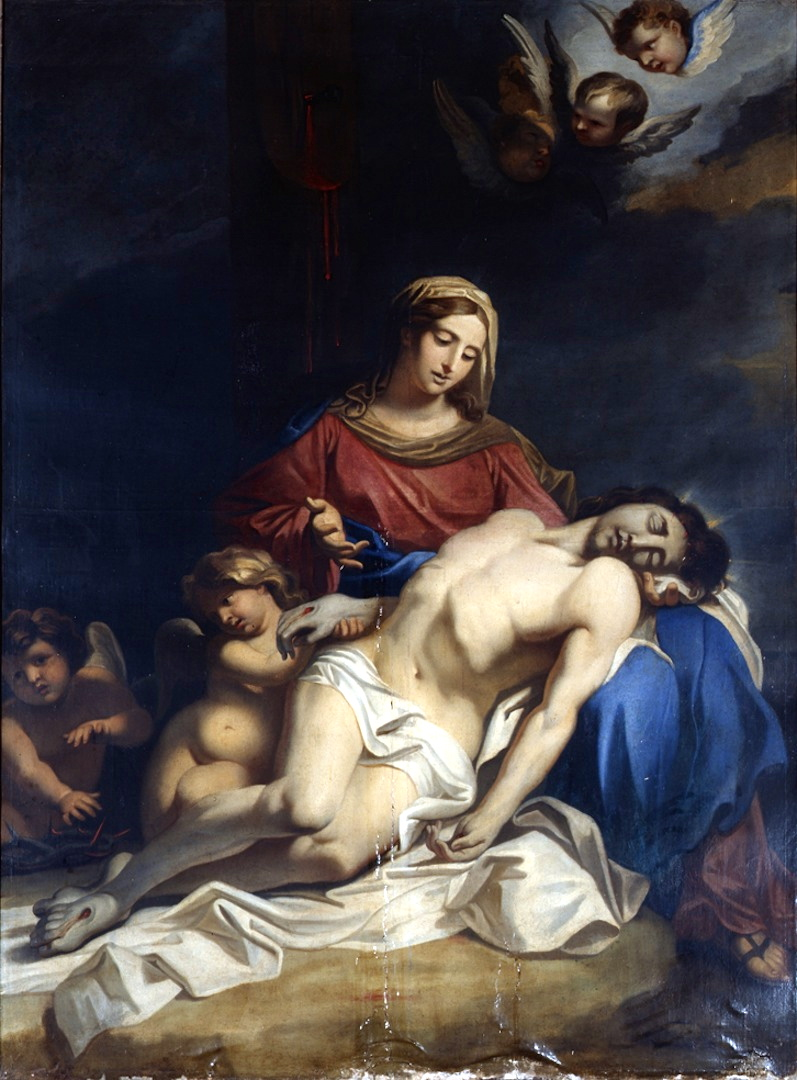
Copy at the church of Saint Peter and Paul of Gonesse

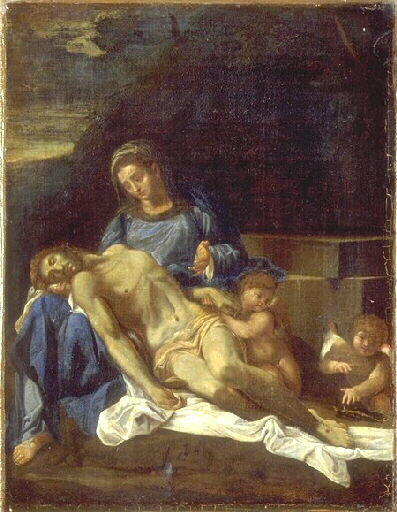
Copy of the Museo di belle arti di Valenciennes

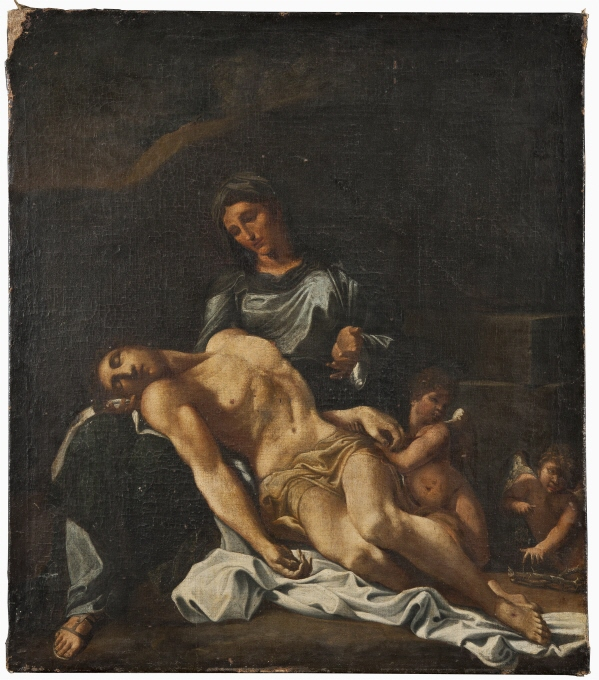
Copy at the Nationalmuseum of Stockholm

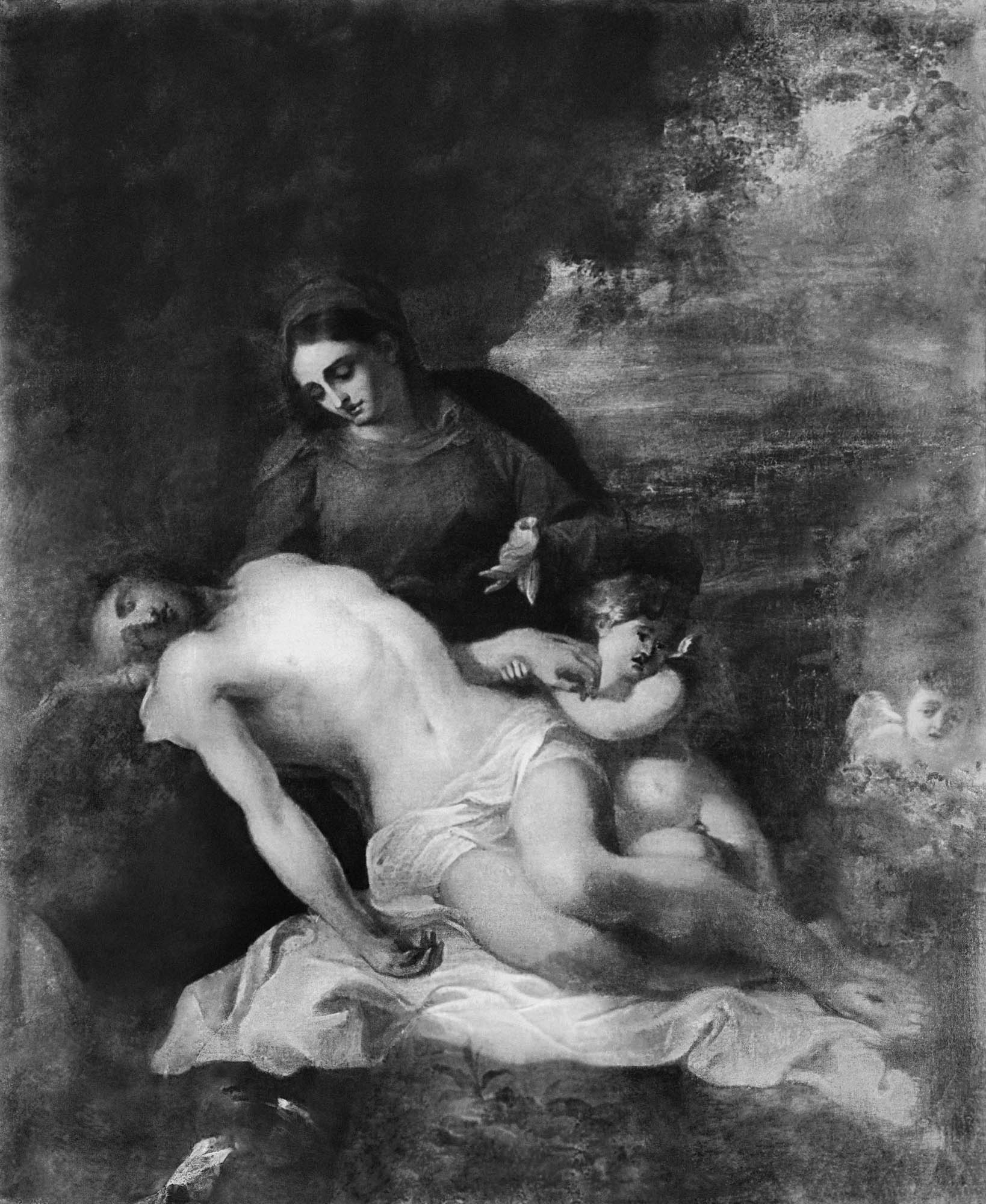
Copy of the UK Royal Collection

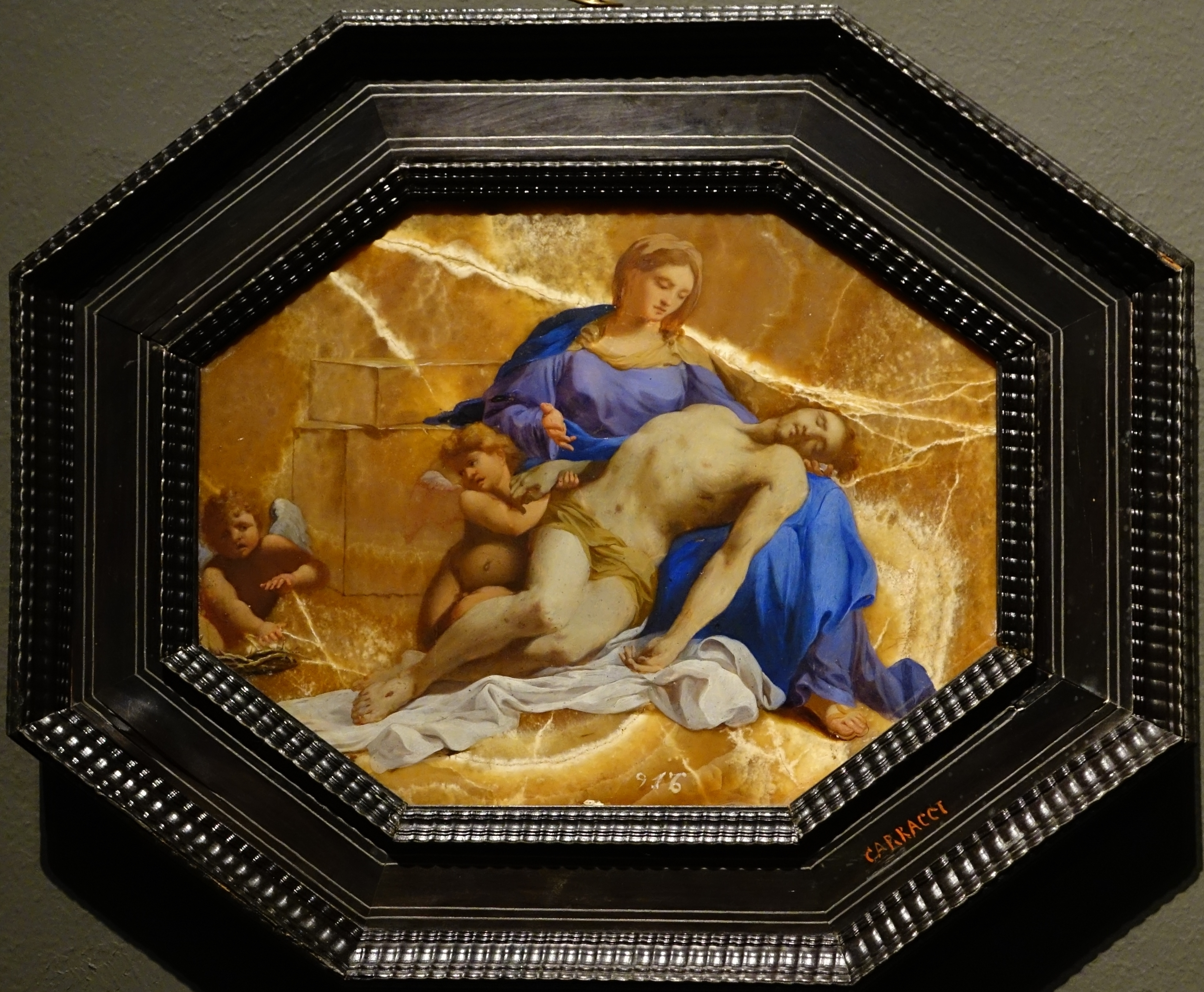
Copy by Simone Cantarini, Monastero dell'Escorial

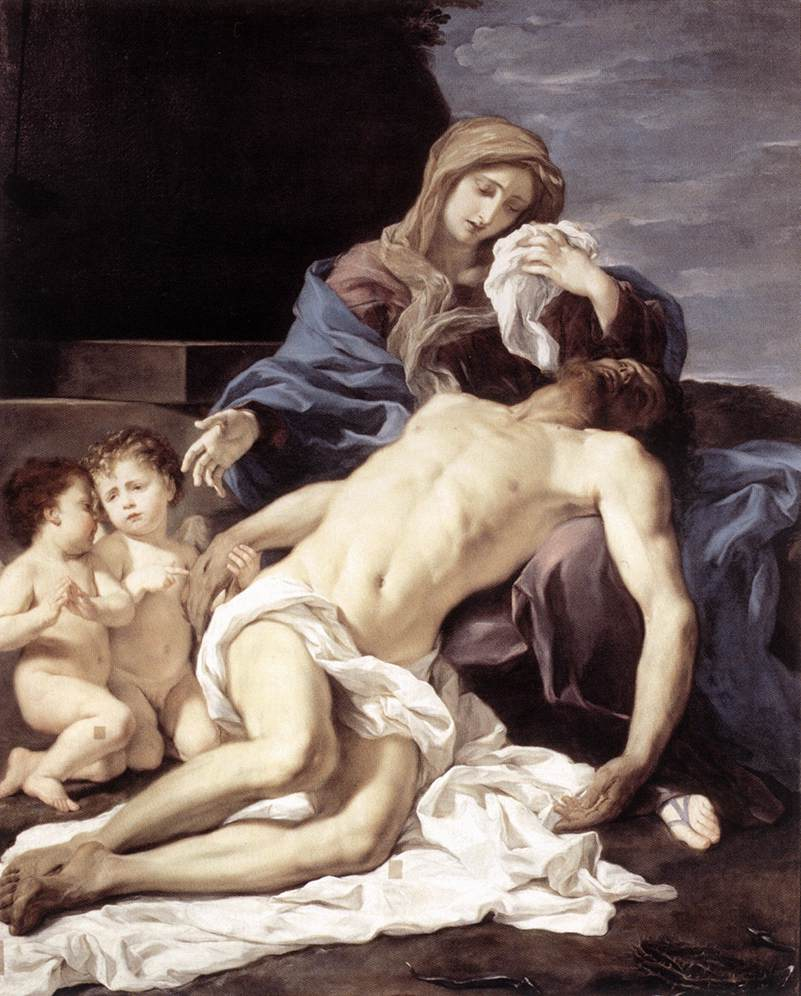
Copy by Giovanni Battista Gaulli, Galleria nazionale d'arte antica

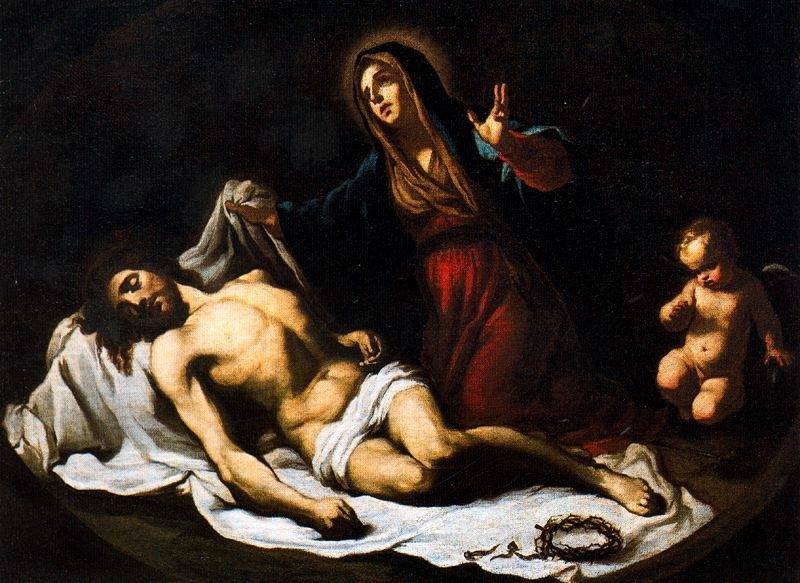
Ludovico Carracci (attributed), Galleria nazionale d'arte antica

== Caravaggio's The Entombment of Christ ==
The Entombment of Christ by Caravaggio, c. 1602–1603

A little after the creation of Carracci's Pietà, Rome received another masterpiece dedicated to the moment of the Passion of Christ: The Entombment of Christ painted by Caravaggio in 1602–1604 for a chapel of Santa Maria in Vallicella (it is now in the Pinacoteca Vaticana).

Studies linked The Entombment and Carracci's Pietà. Carracci's work stimulated Caravaggio to personally reinterpret the sculpture of Michelangelo, which The Entombment also refers to. This exchange was part of a long-distance dialog between the two painters, who both came from the north of Italy to Rome at the end of the 16th century and beginning of the 17th and caused lasting changes in the tradition of painting.

== Van Dyck and lamentations ==
The Flemish painter Anthony van Dyck apparently studied Carraci's Pietà during his journeys to Rome early in the 17th century.

In multiple versions of the theme of the "lamentation" by Van Dyck, there is evidence of the influence of Carracci's Pietà painting and thePietà di Caprarola engraving. For example, Van Dyck's paintings share compositional similarities, Christ's sculptural beauty, and the hand of Christ held delicately by a supporter.

Van Dyck, 1629, Koninklijk Museum voor Schone Kunsten, Antwerp

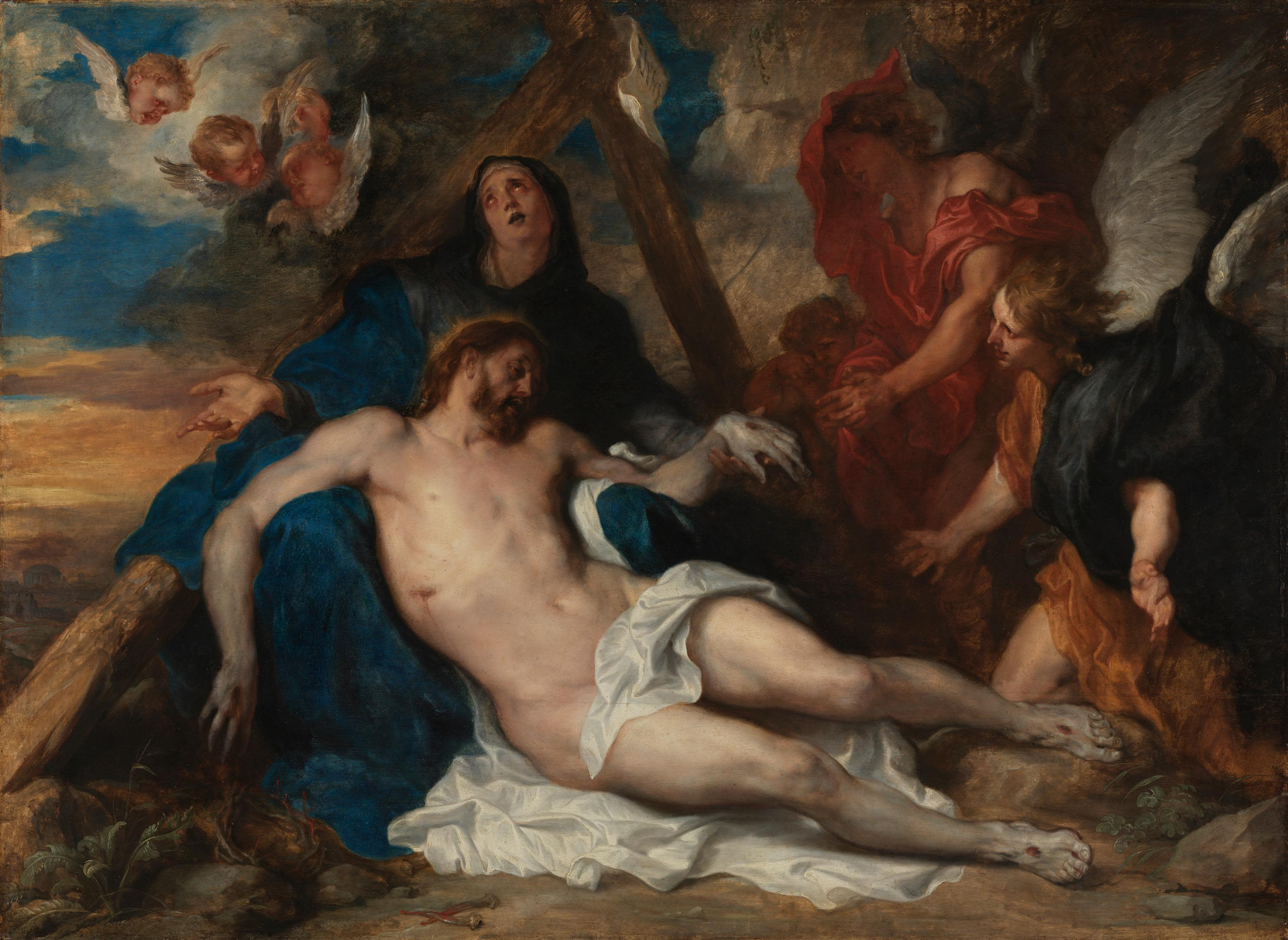
Van Dyck, 1628–1630, Munich Alte Pinakothek

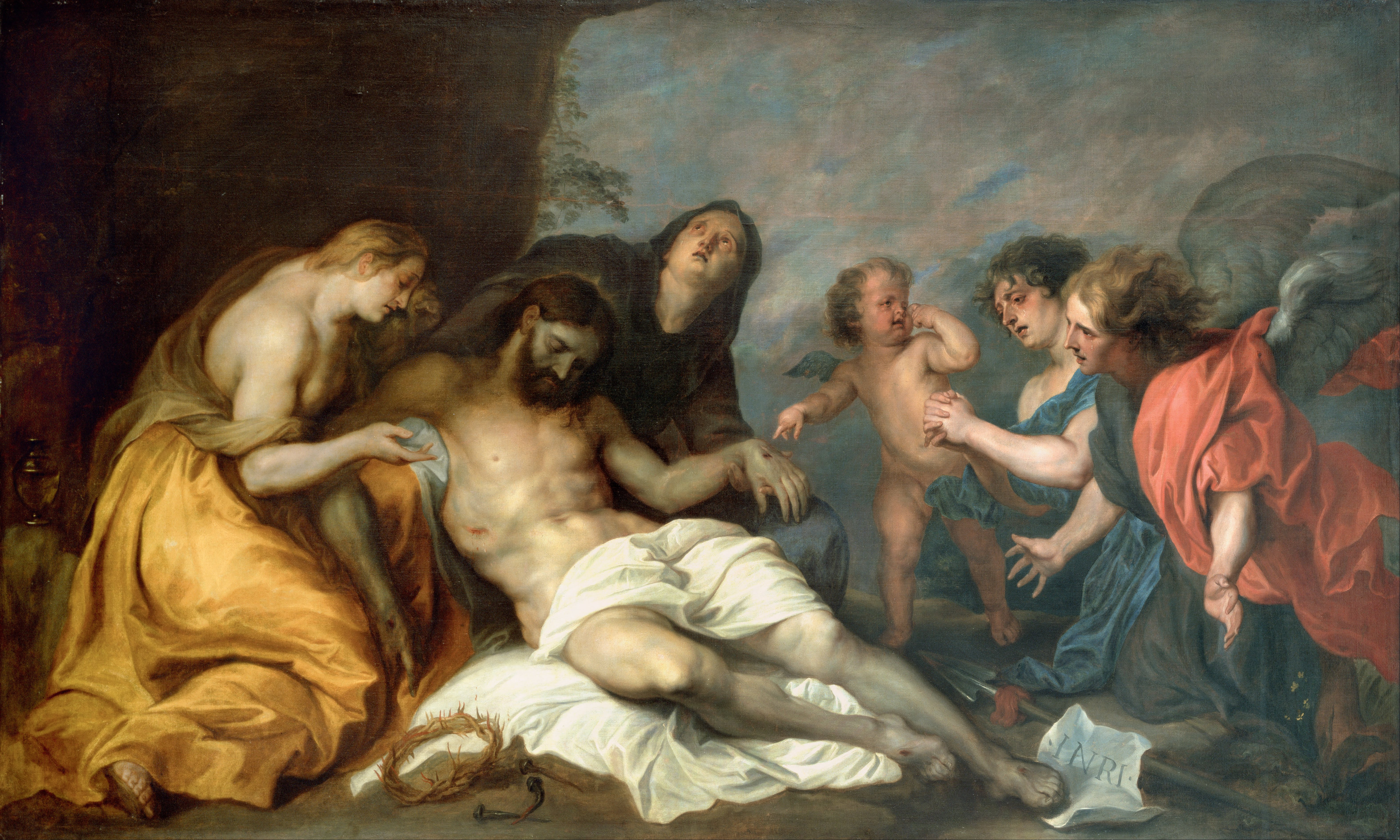
Van Dyck, 1634–1640, Bilbao Fine Arts Museum

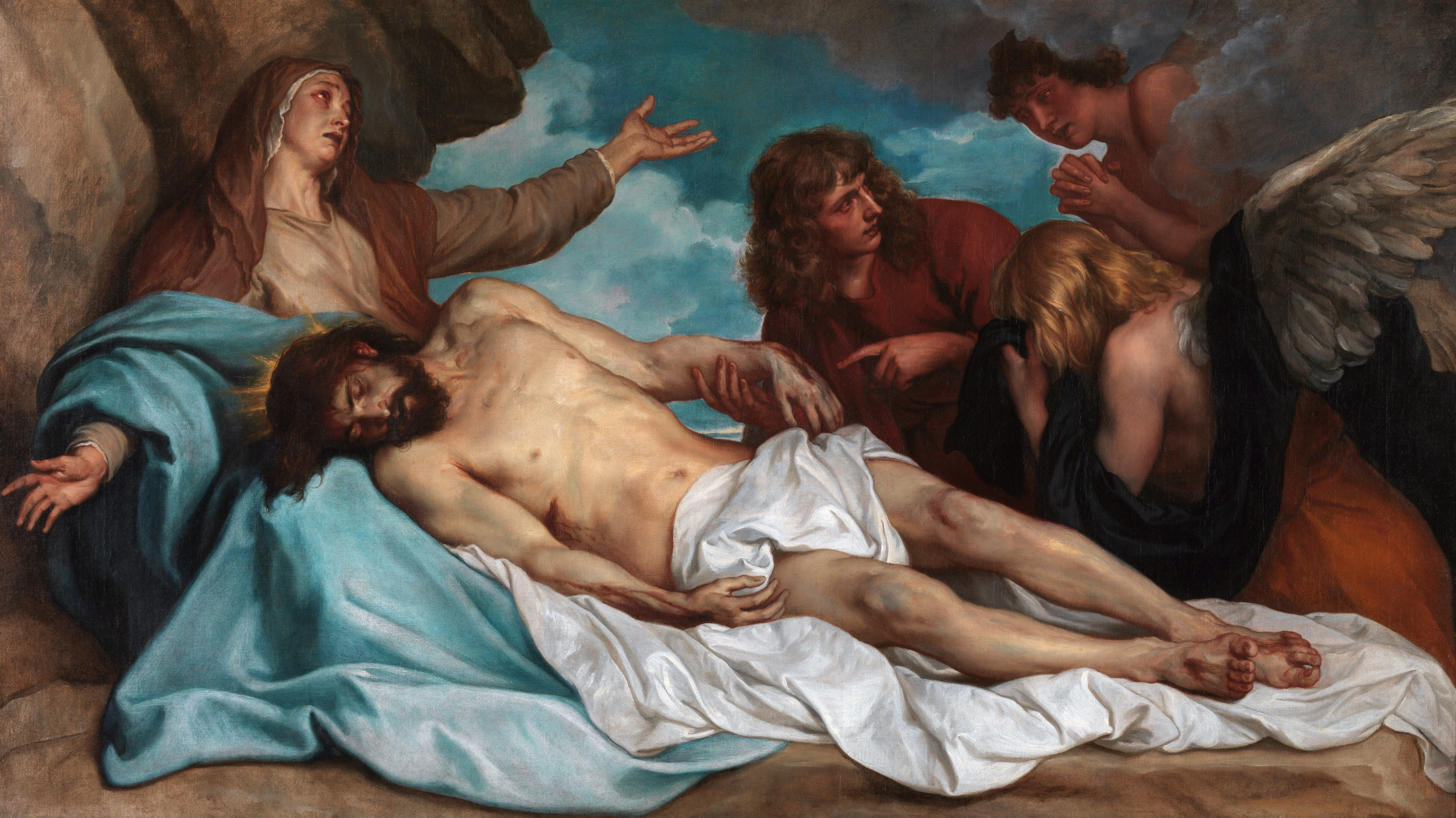
Van Dyck, 1635, Koninklijk Museum voor Schone Kunsten, Antwerp
