= Lamentation (Correggio) =

Painting by Correggio

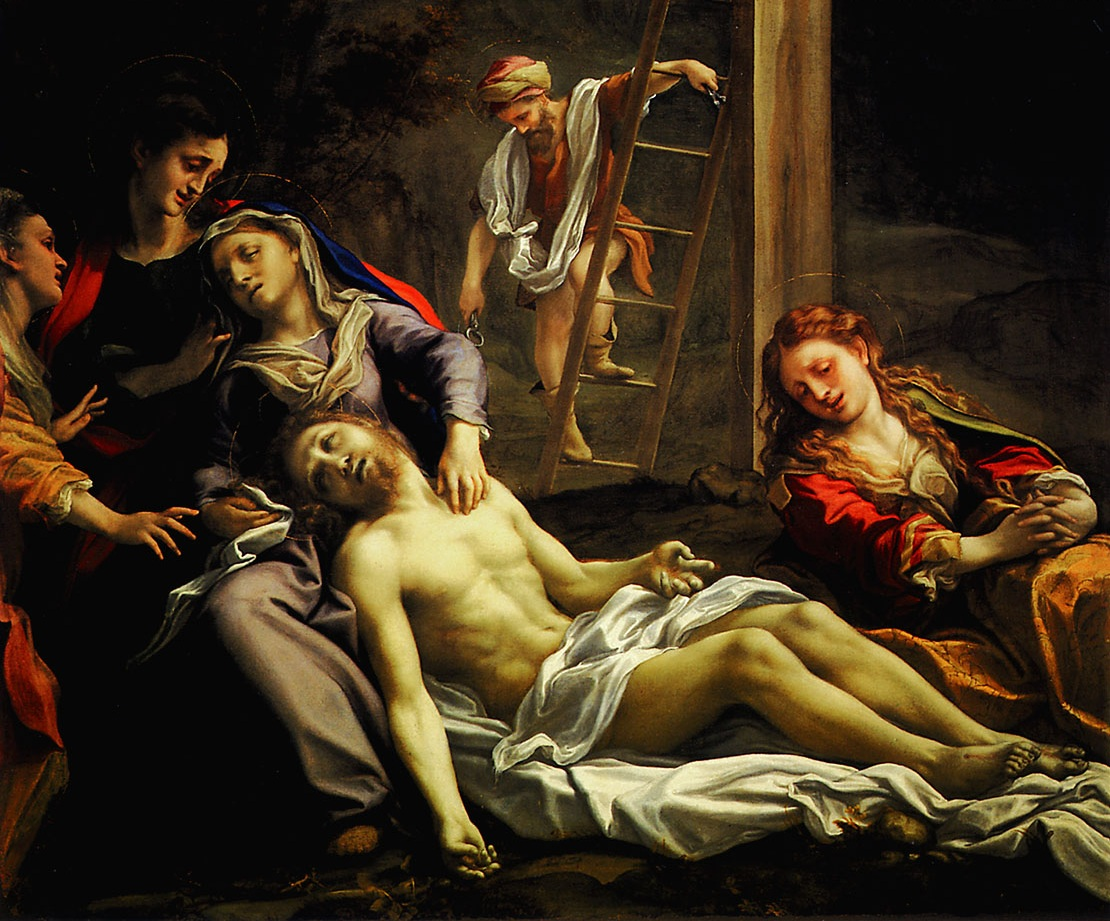
- Artist: Correggio
- Year: c. 1524
- Medium: Oil on canvas
- Dimensions: 157 cm × 182 cm (62 in × 72 in)
- Location: Galleria Nazionale, Parma

The Lamentation of Christ (also known as Deposition) is an oil on canvas painting by the Italian Renaissance artist Correggio, dating from around 1524 and housed in the Galleria Nazionale of Parma, Italy.

== History ==
The work is one of the canvasses commissioned by Parmesan noble Placido Del Bono for a chapel in the church of San Giovanni Evangelista in Parma. They are mentioned (although wrongly assigned to the city's cathedral) by late Renaissance art biographer Giorgio Vasari in the first edition of his Lives (1550).

== Description ==
The work shows the common Lamentation of Christ theme, with Jesus depicted immediately after his deposition from the cross, surrounded by the people who loved him in life. They include John, who supports a Virgin Mary shattered by pain, Mary Magdalene crying at Jesus' feet and, in the background, Nicodemus with the pincer he used to remove Christ's nails. The composition was studied accurately to be watched from an oblique point of view, from the entrance of the Del Bono chapel in the church of San Giovanni Evangelista.

== Sources ==
- Adani, Giuseppe (2007). Correggio pittore universale. Correggio: Silvana Editoriale.
