= Madonna and Child with Saints (Annibale Carracci, 1588) =

Painting by Annibale Carracci

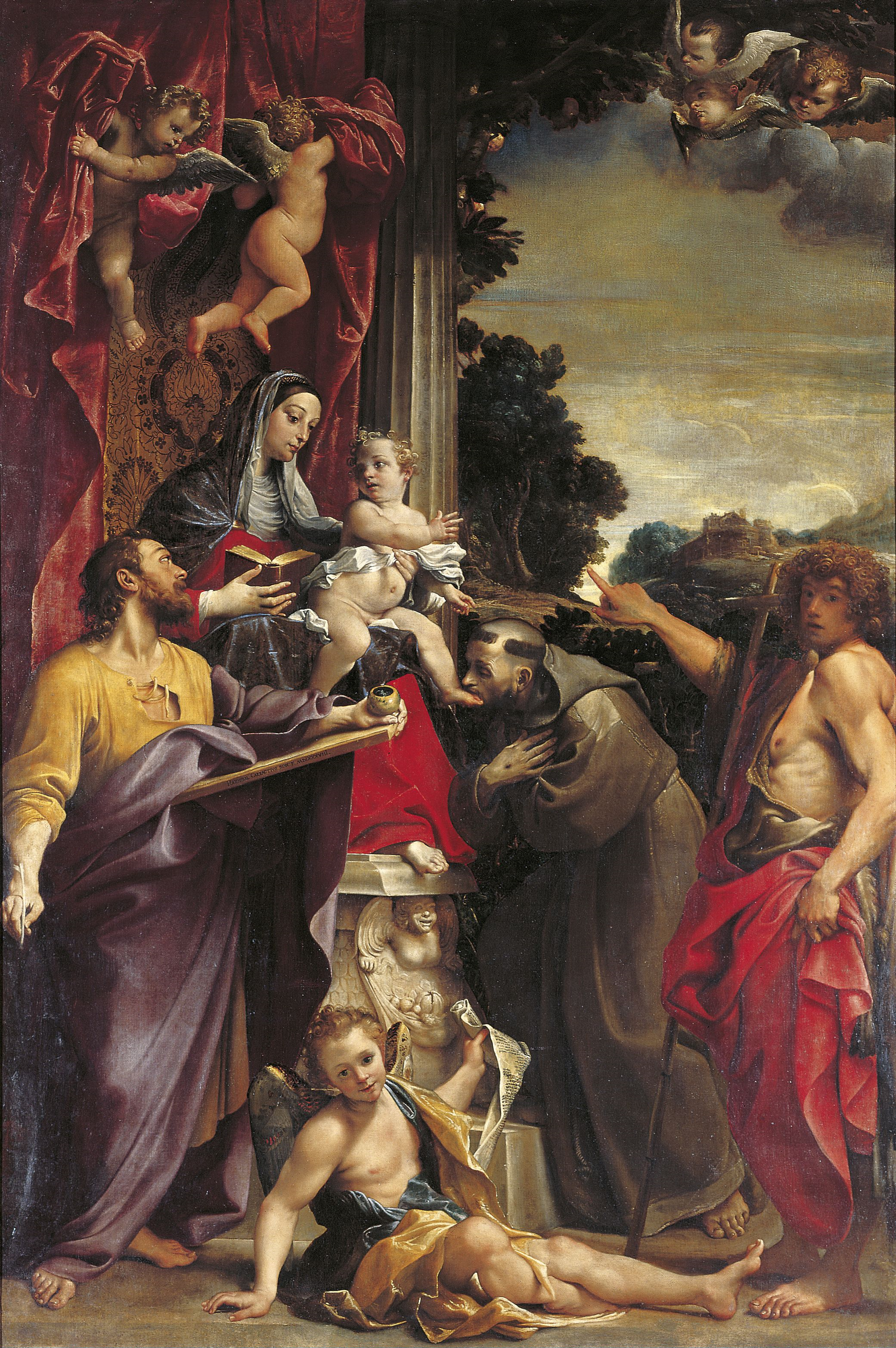
Madonna and Child with Saints (1588)

Madonna and Child with Saints is a 1588 oil painting on canvas by the Italian painter Annibale Carracci, now in the Gemäldegalerie Alte Meister in Dresden. Signed and dated by the artist (HANNIBAL CARRACTIVS BON. F. MDLXXXVIII), it is also known as Madonna and Child with Saints Francis, Matthew and John the Baptist, Madonna and Child Enthroned with Saint Matthew and the St Matthew Madonna.

It was originally produced as an altarpiece for the merchants' chapel in the basilica of San Prospero in Reggio Emilia, one of several works the artist produced whilst in the city in the 1580s and 1590s. It then entered the Este collections in Modena, from which it was sold in 1746 as part of the Dresden sale to Augustus III, taking it to its present home.

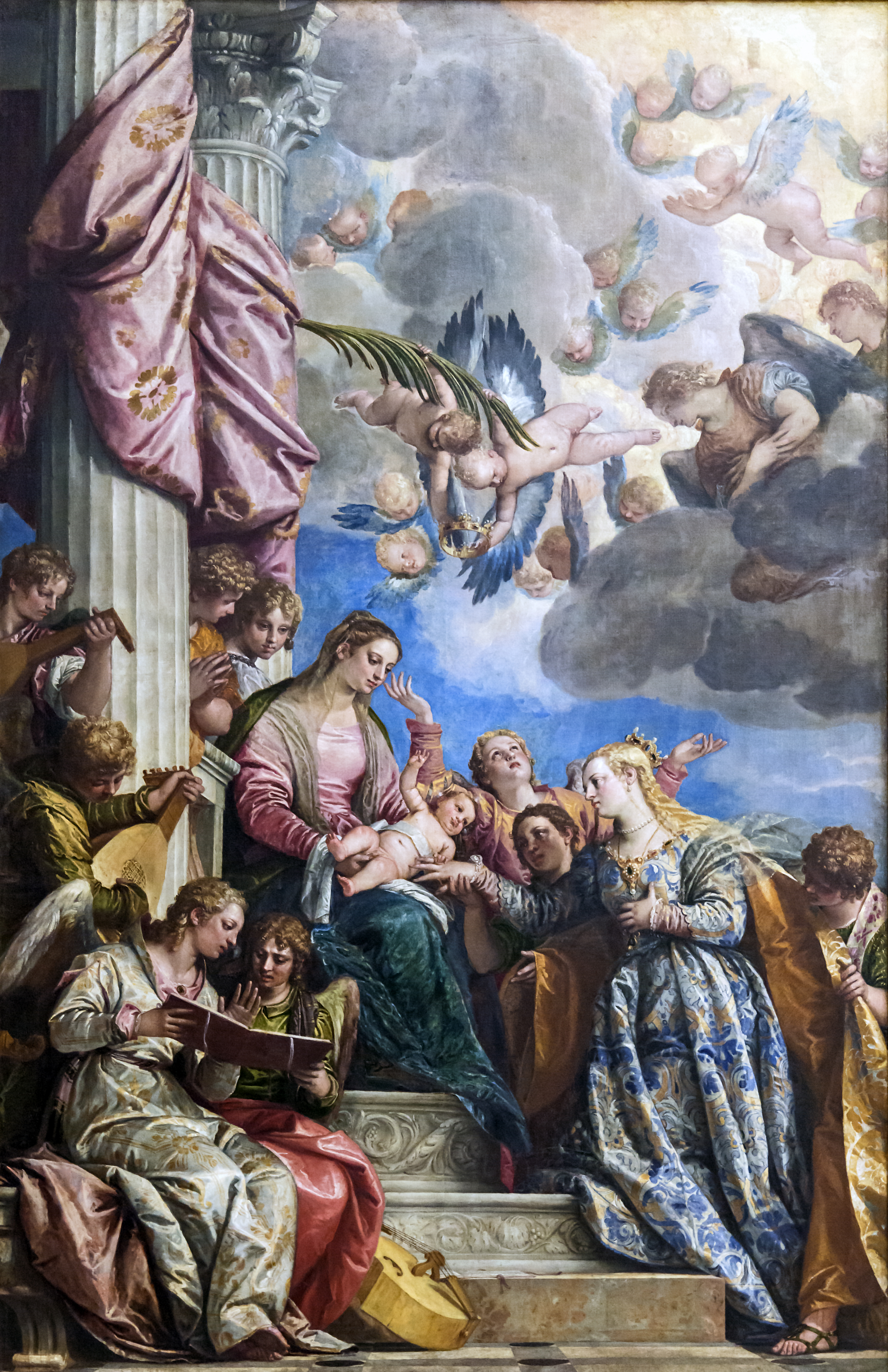
Paolo Veronese, Mystic Marriage of St Catherine, 1571, Gallerie dell'Accademia, Venice

The work shows a stronger Venetian influence than any of the artist's earlier works and its precise dating allows art historians to date his study trip to Venice to 1587–1588. One clear influence on its composition is Paolo Veronese's Mystic Marriage of Saint Catherine, from which it borrows its diagonals, the position of the Madonna and saints and the red drape hanging from columns. Carracci did not entirely reject his previous style, however, and so these lessons from Veronese are translated into a less otherworldly idiom, closer to the viewer's lived experience – Carracci opts for a glimpse of a landscape background rather than the celestial blue of so many of Veronese's works and the saints humbly clothed and standing on bare earth rather than the richly-dressed figures on stairs in Veronese's work.

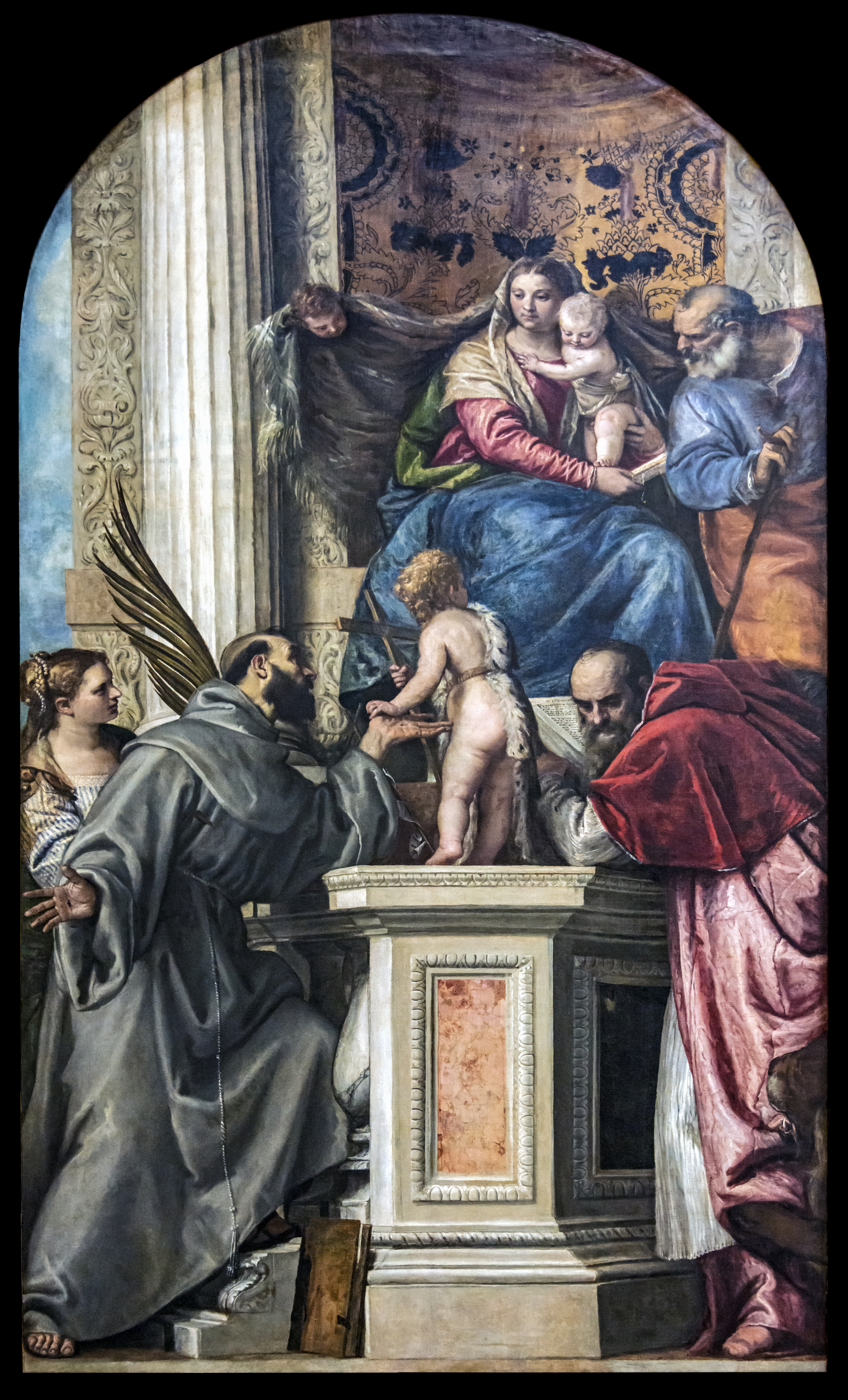
Paolo Veronese, Madonna and Child with Saints 1562–1564, Gallerie dell'Accademia, Venice

Even the attitude of the Child who, surprised by the devotional gesture of Saint Francis who kisses his foot, turns to his Mother in search of reassurance is another device with which Annibale introduces the human element into his composition. It has been noted that Veronese's "Mystic Marriage of Saint Catherine" had been the subject, a few years before the realization of the altarpiece for the chapel of the merchants of Reggio Emilia, of an engraving transposition by Agostino Carracci, one of the many that Annibale's elder brother produced in Venice on the basis of paintings by local masters and Veronese in particular.

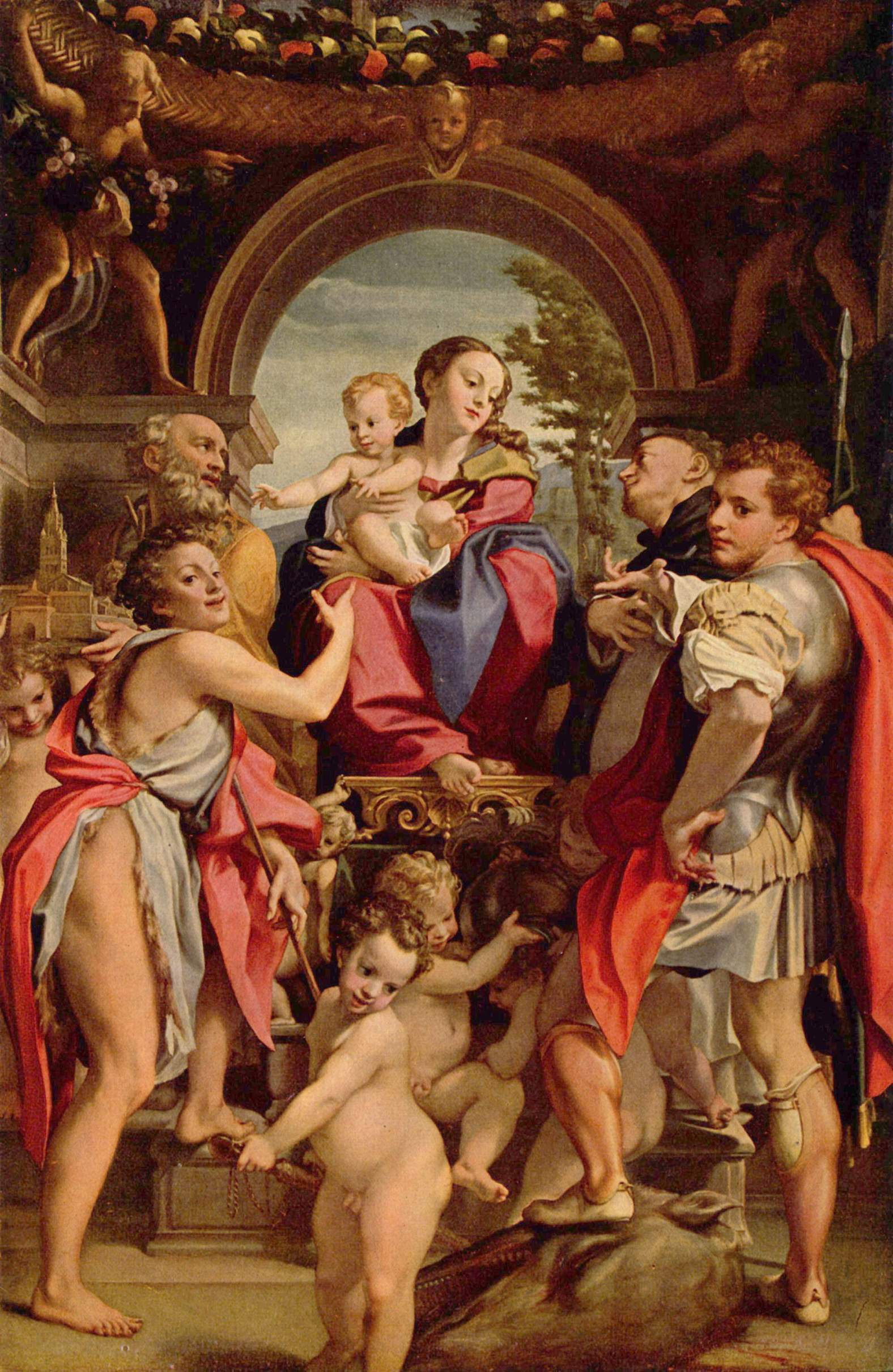
Correggio, Madonna and Child with Saint George, ca. 1530, Dresden, Gemäldegalerie Alte Meister

This precedent may have stimulated the attention of the youngest Carracci towards Paolo's masterpiece, although at a critical level it appears certain that the Madonna on the throne now preserved in Dresden implies Annibale Carracci's direct knowledge of Veronese's painting.

Another painting by Veronese has also been linked to the altarpiece in the Gemäldegalerie: the canvas, also depicting a Madonna enthroned with Child and saints, known as the "San Zaccaria Altarpiece". The decorative motif of the carpet behind the Virgin, the angel opening a curtain as well as the position of St. Francis leaning forward are indicated as tangencies between the two compositions.

Although strongly inspired by Veronese's painting, even in this work by Annibale there are reminiscences of Correggio, a master who since the Baptism of the church of Saints Gregory and Syrus had been a fundamental point of reference for the Bolognese artist.

The influence of Correggio can be seen in the angel sitting on the ground presenting the scene to the observer, a compositional motif that was common for Correggio as can be observed both in the Madonna and Child with Saint George and in the San Sebastiano Madonna, paintings also preserved in Dresden (these two masterpieces were also included in the sale of the best works of the Este family to the Saxon princes).

Carracci's angel also shows a certain assonance with the Saint John the Baptist that can be observed in the altarpiece created by Bartolomeo Passarotti for the basilica of San Giacomo Maggiore, in Bologna, a work which in turn clearly derives from Correggio.

Two preparatory drawings of Annibale's Madonna Enthroned are known, one relating to the figure of the Baptist (British Museum) and the other to that of the Child Jesus (Cabinet of Drawings and Prints of the Uffizi).

== Gallery ==
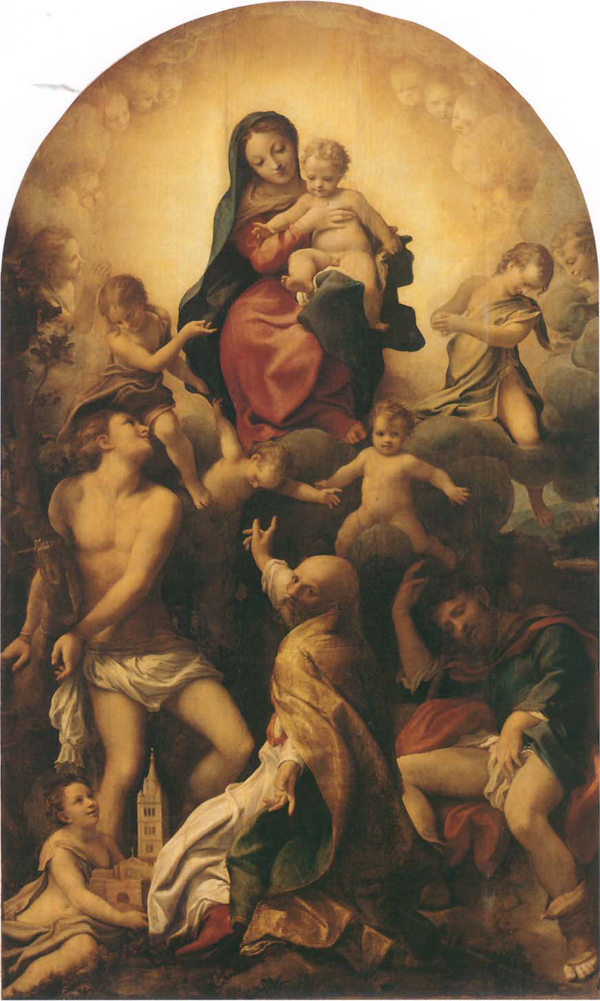
Correggio, San Sebastiano Madonna, ca. 1524, Gemäldegalerie Alte Meister, Dresden

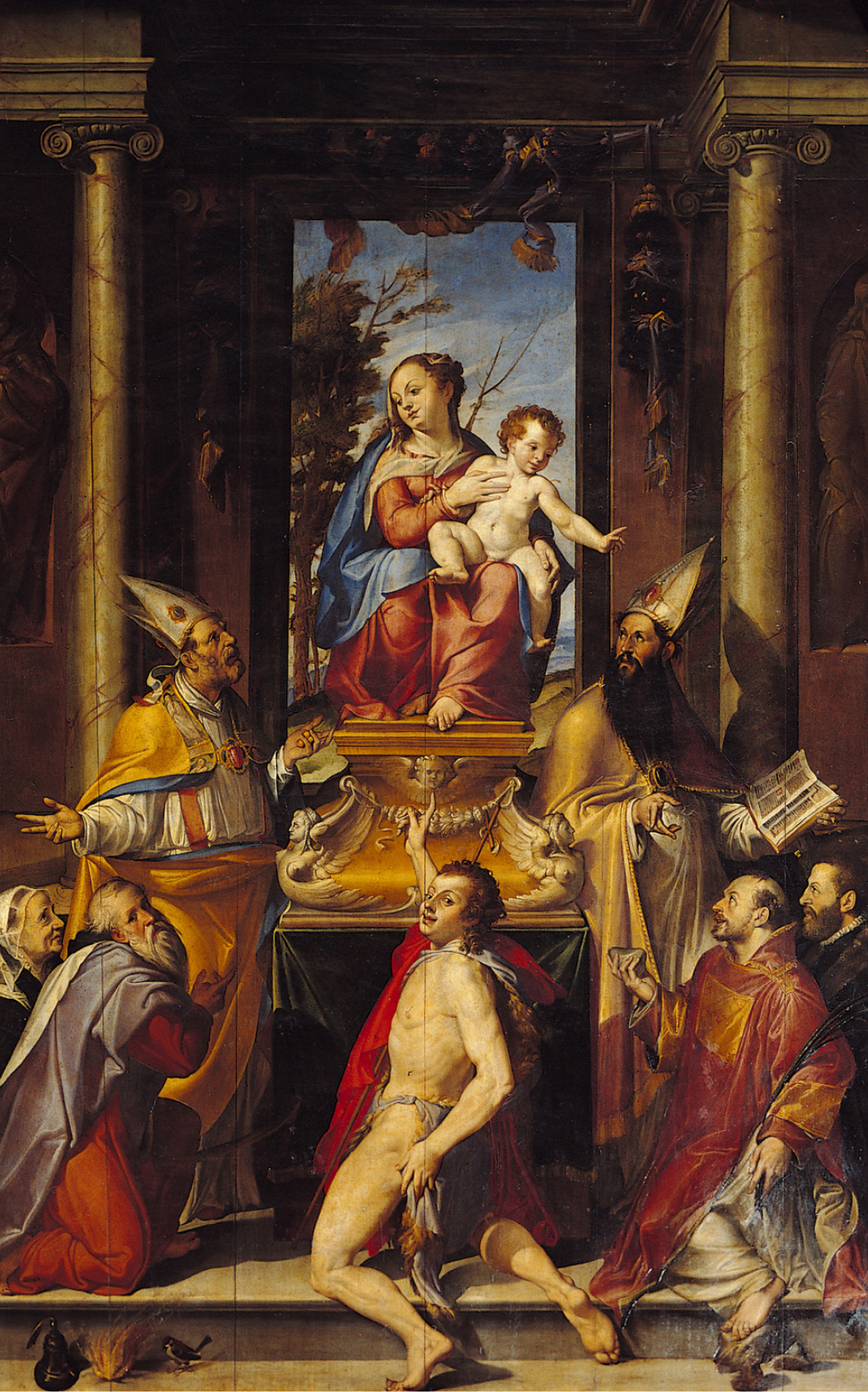
Bartolomeo Passarotti, Madonna and Child with Saints, 1560–1565, basilica di San Giacomo Maggiore, Bologna

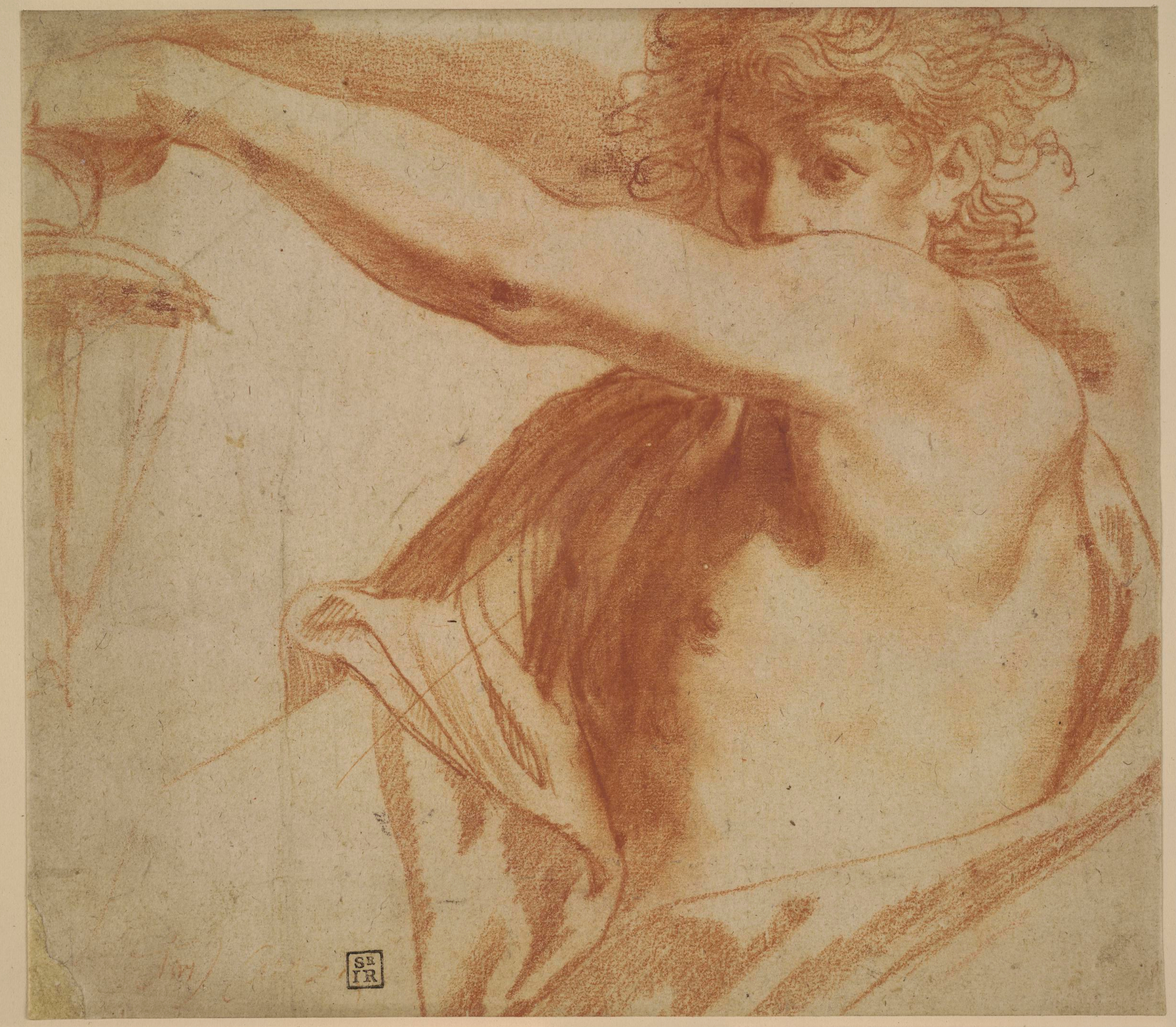
Annibale Carracci, Study for the figure of St John the Baptist, 1588, British Museum, London

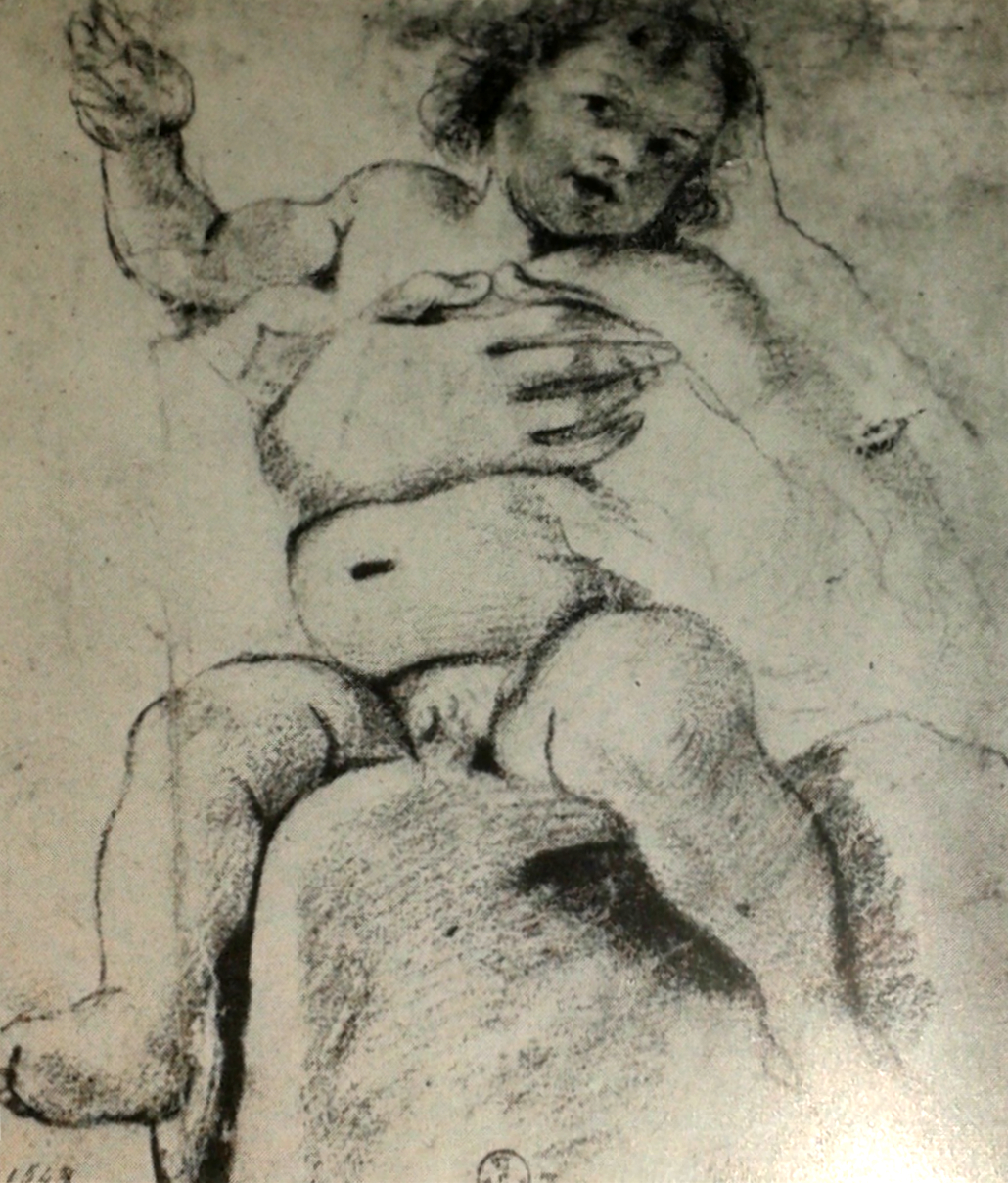
Annibale Carracci, Study for the figure of the Christ Child, 1588, Uffizi, Florence
