= Sant'Andrea Apostolo di Quarto Superiore =

Church building in Bologna, Italy

Coordinates: 44°31′19.5″N 11°25′5.5″E

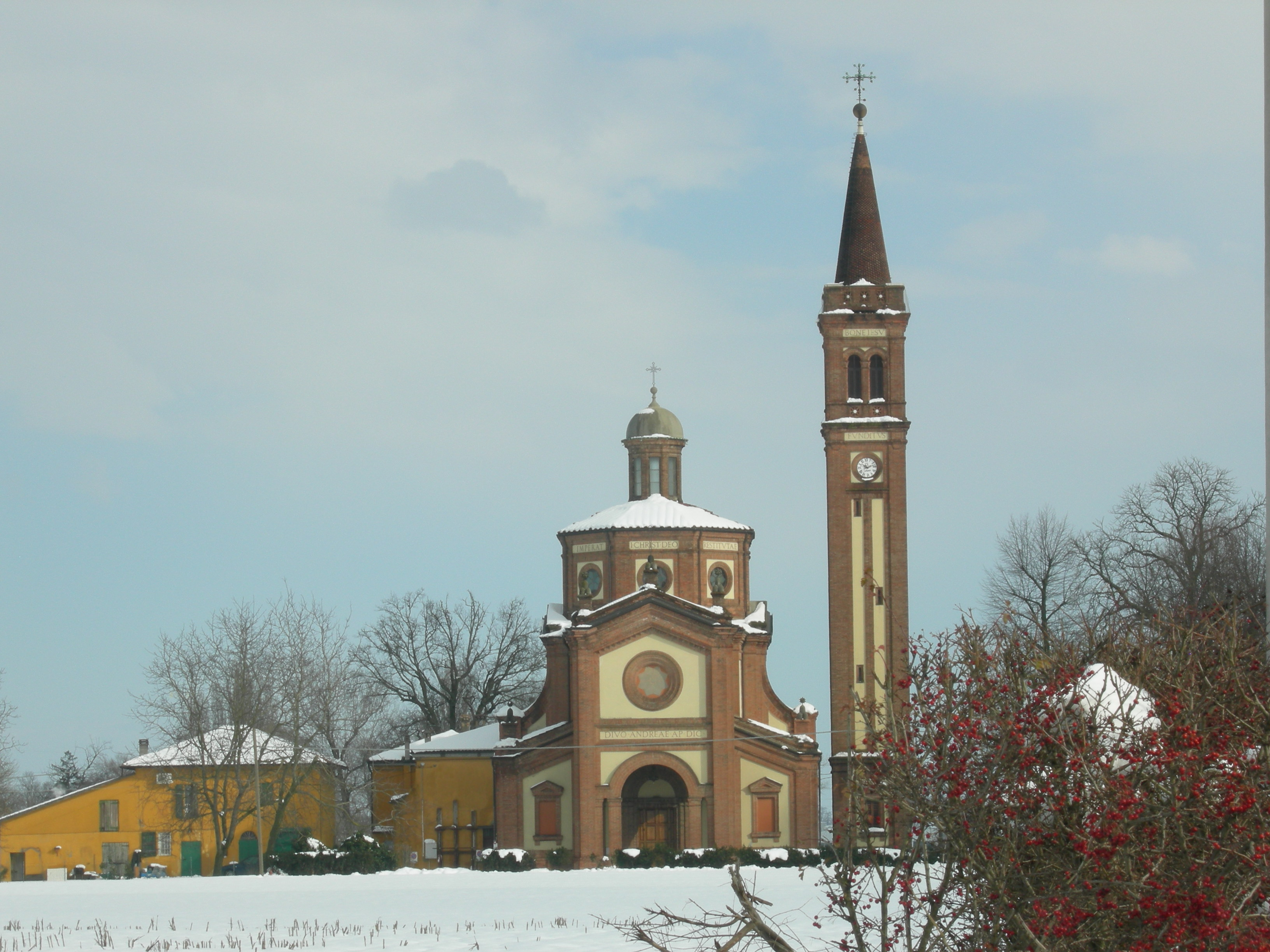
Sant'Andrea di Quarto Sup.JPG

Sant'Andrea Apostolo di Quarto Superiore is a Roman Catholic parish church located in the frazione, or neighborhood, of Quarto Superiore in the San Donato-San Vitale quarter of Bologna, region of Emilia Romagna, Italy.

== History ==
A church, dedicated to St Andrew the Apostle, is documented at the site by 1378. Records indicated a number of restorations between 1697 and 1780. The belltower was built in 1775, and rebuilt in 1899 by Edoardo Collamarini. In 1869, the main chapel, was frescoed by Alessandro Guardassoni and Luigi Samoggia. Collamarini also refurbished the church in 1899–1910. The interiors include a Crucifixion with St Peter Martyr by Guercino. The main altarpiece depicts a Madonna, il Bambino e i Santi Andrea, Sebastiano e Giovanni Battista by the studio of Francesco Albani.
