= Santi Gregorio e Siro =

Parish church in Bologna, Italy

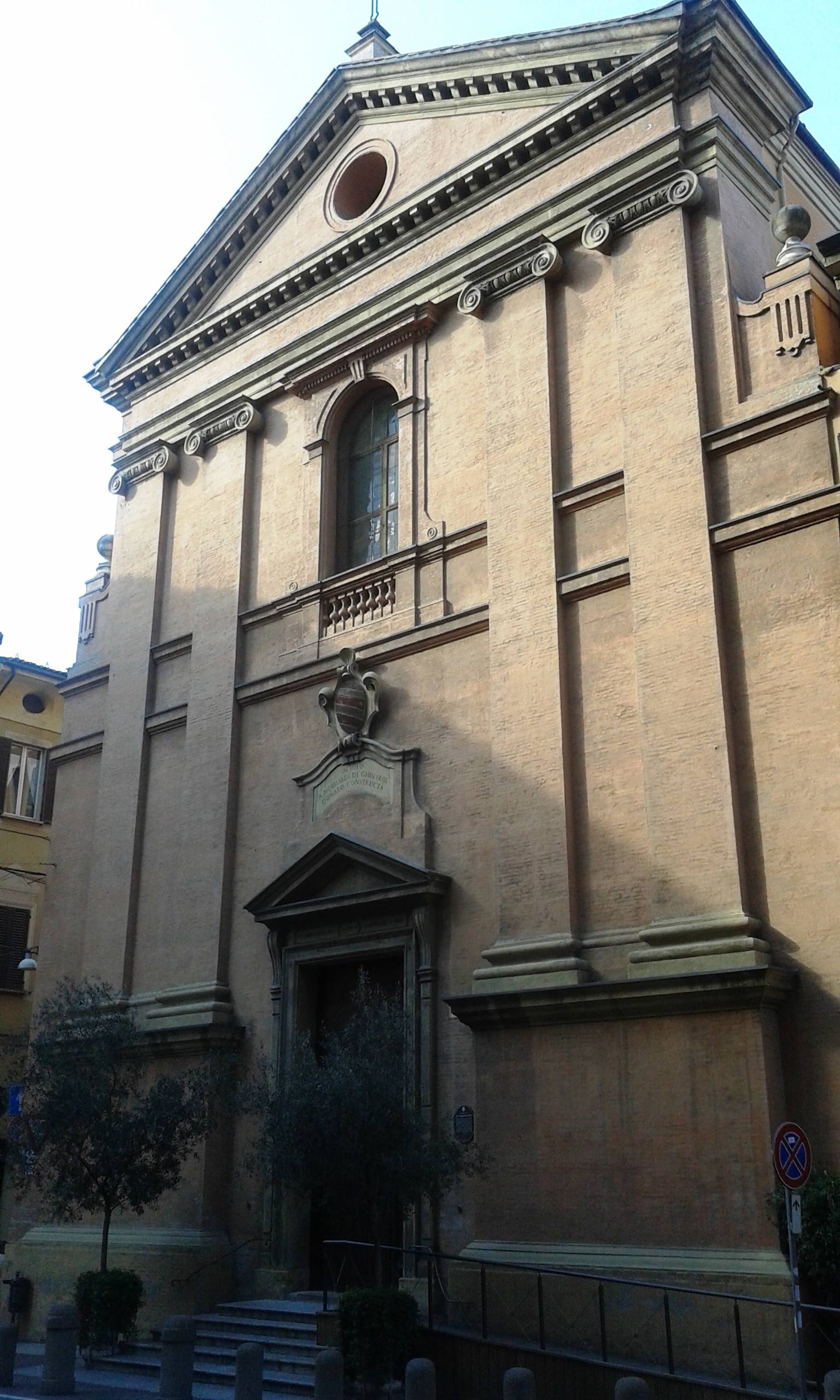
Facade of Santi Gregorio e Siro

The church of Santi Gregorio e Siro is a Renaissance-style Roman Catholic parish church on Via Montegrappa 15 in central Bologna, Italy. Initially this was the Church of San Gregorio, but when the nearby parish church of San Siro had been torn down, and the names were fused.

== History ==
It was founded on grounds that had been expropriated by the Ghislieri family from the Bentivoglio. It was constructed by the canons of San Giorgio in Alga, an island in the lagoon of Venice; the architects were Tibaldo Tibaldi (Tibaldo Cristoforo di Tibaldi) and Giovanni Antonio, both from Milan.

In 1676, it passed to the order of Clerics Regular ministering to the sick (Chierici Regolari Ministri degli Infermi). The earthquake of 1780 damaged the church, and it was rebuilt by the architect Angelo Venturoli. Over the entry is the heraldic shield of the Ghisilieri family, and the bell-tower was adapted from a medieval tower from a family palace.

== Interior ==
The simple exterior does not reflect the highly decorated interior, which has ceiling frescoes by Luigi Samoggia and Alessandro Guardassoni (1868), a main altarpiece is a St Gregory shows the bleeding Eucharist to the Heretic by Denys Calvaert (1581) and works by Camillo Procaccini. Among the decorations is an Eternal Father by Ludovico Carracci. The altar decoration is in marble called Formaginni di Sanremo.

Other works listed inside the church by Bianconi include:

- St Sebastian wounded with St Fabiano decapitated by Giovanni Luigi Valesio
- St John of Nepomuk by Paris Porroni
- Assunta attributed to Procaccini
- St Emidio (Emygdius) Ovals by Giovanni Andrea Claudio Portoni
- St Camillus de Lellis by Felice Torelli
- Virgin with St Andrew, Lorenzo Giustiniani and Anthony Abbot by Lucio Massari
- Jesus baptized in Glory by God the Father attributed to a young Annibale Carracci
- Transit of St Joseph by Carlo Antonio Rambaldi
- St George and the Dragon with Archangel Michael and the Devil by Ludovico Carracci
- St Lawrence and the sacred heart of Jesus by Jacopo Alessandro Calvi
