= Trebbi =

Trebbi is an Italian surname. Notable people with the surname include:

- Cesare Mauro Trebbi (1847–1931), Italian painter and lithographer
- Faustino Trebbi (1761–1836), Italian architect and painter
- Ivanne Trebbi (1928–2026), Italian politician
- Mario Trebbi (1939–2018), Italian footballer and manager
