= San Giovanni Evangelista, Orvieto =

Church in Orvieto, Italy

Coordinates: 42.71755°N 12.10555°E

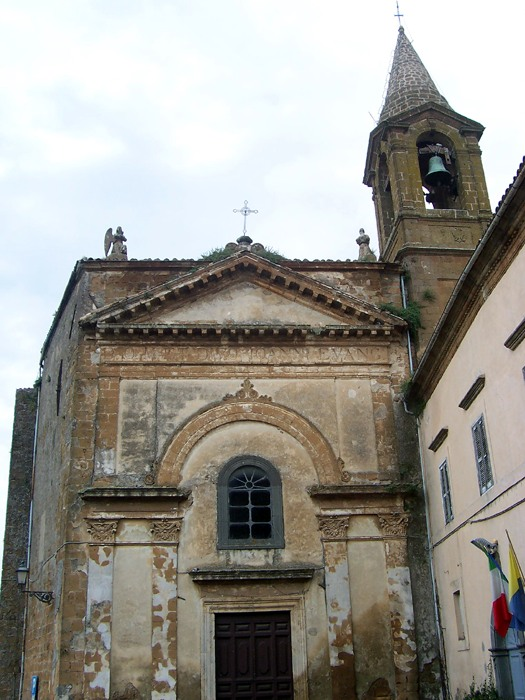
Facade prior to repainting

San Giovanni Evangelista is a Neoclassical architecture, Roman Catholic parish church on Piazza Giovanni Evangelista in the south-west corner of historic Orvieto, region of Umbria, Italy. Across the piazza is the church of Santa Maria del Pianto.

== History and description ==
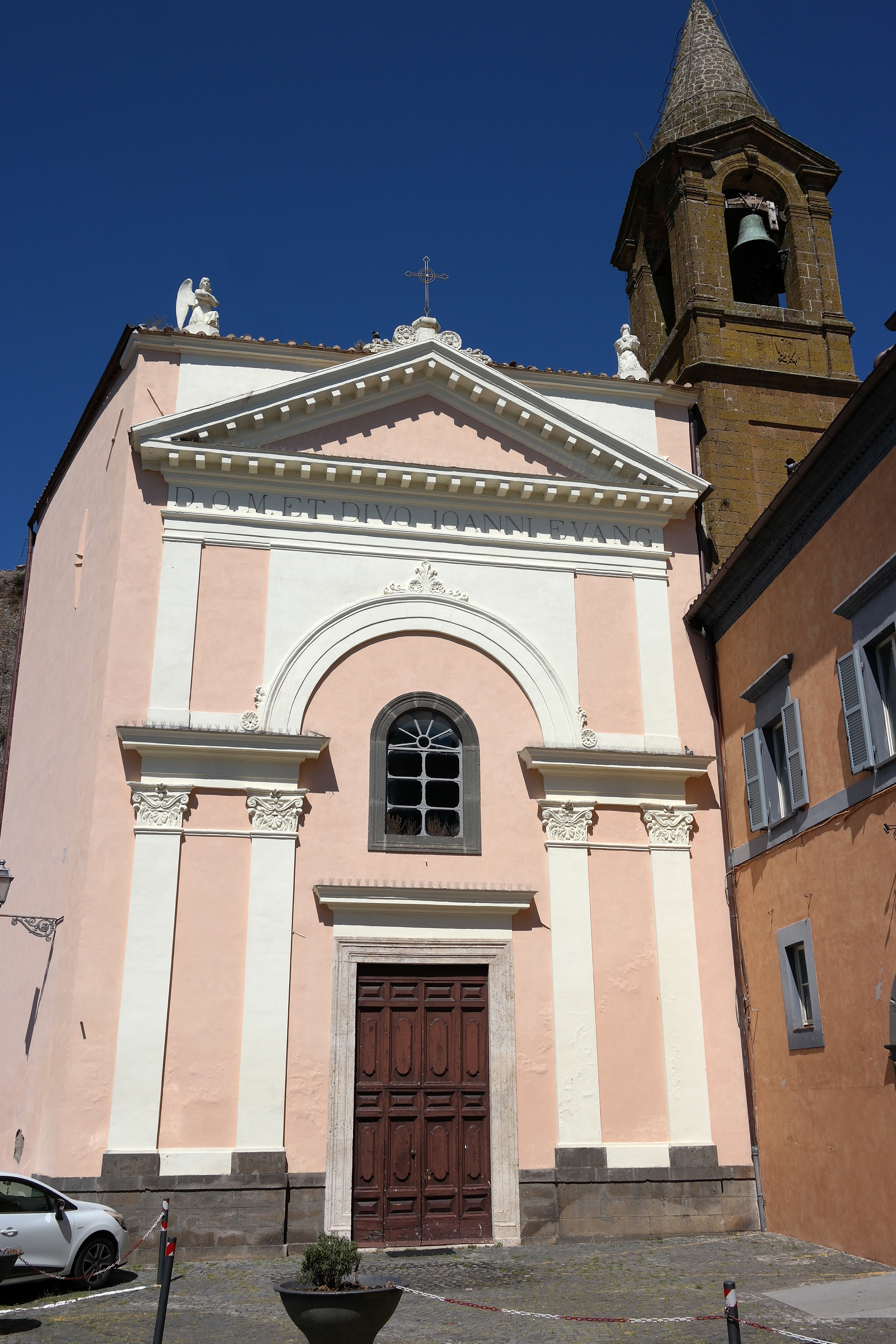
Painted facade.

Piccolomini Adami in his 1883 guide states the site once held an ancient theater, and that white granite columns from that theater were reused in the loggia of the Palazzo del Opera del Duomo. Other sources stat a column with Etruscan inscriptions, now in the Museo Nazionale of Archeology in Orvieto, suggest the site had a temple to Zeus. The church, originally called San Giovanni Evangelista de Platea was an Augustinian abbey church putatively founded in 916 by Pope John X. By 1003, it was refurbished under Pope John XVII. It required reconsecration in 1216 under Pope Innocent III. Of these ancient church, only the holy water font dates to before the year 1000. By 1498 Pope Alexander VI assigned the church to Canons Regular of the Lateran from the Congregation of San Salvatore, Bologna. The church was associated with a hospice. In 1517, Pope Leo X assigned the church to Canons Regular. A bequest from Bishop Giorgio della Rovere, who died 1505, paid for the refurbishment of the church in this era.

Severely damaged by the earthquake of 1687, the church was razed and rebuilt with an octagonal design by the architect Giovanni Battista Arrigoni. It was rebuilt a decade later with the opposite orientation and on an octagonal plan, to a design by Giovanni Battista Arrigoni. The facade was completed in 1857 and the campanile was built in 1928.
