= Santissimo Salvatore, Bologna =

Church in Bologna, Italy

Church of Santissimo Salvatore
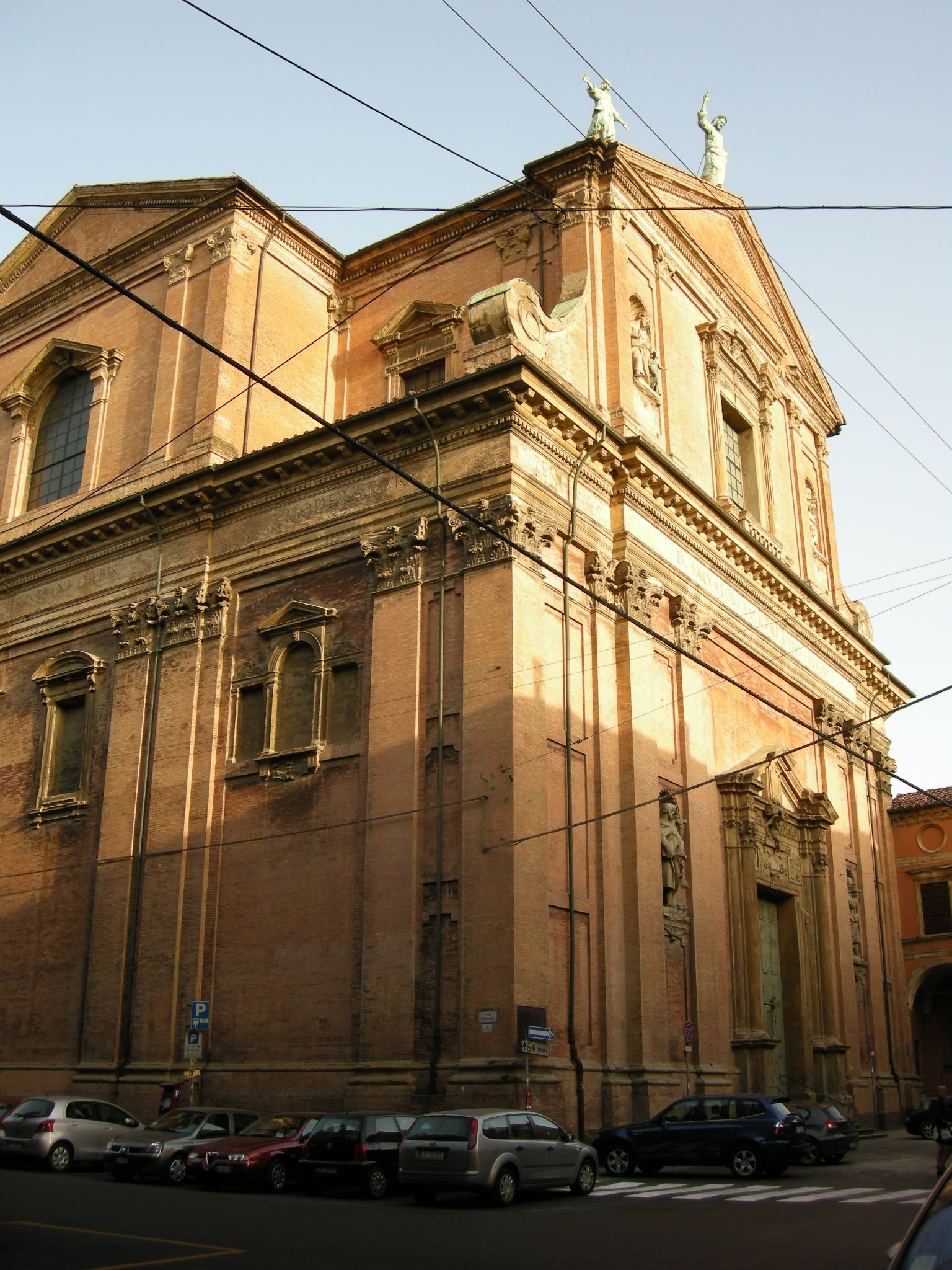

Religion
- Affiliation: Roman Catholic
- Province: Bologna

Location
- Location: Bologna, Italy
- Interactive map of Church of Santissimo Salvatore
- Coordinates: 44.4939°N 11.3391°E

Architecture
- Architect: Giovanni Ambrogio Mazenta
- Type: Church
- Style: Baroque
- Groundbreaking: 1605

Santissimo Salvatore is a Baroque-style Roman Catholic church in central Bologna, Emilia-Romagna, Italy.

== History ==
A 12th-century church at the site once hosted the Canons Regular monks of Santa Maria di Reno. The church was constructed in its present form in 1605-1623 under the direction of the Barnabite priest Giovanni Ambrogio Mazenta, assisted by the architect Tommaso Martelli. It contains eight chapels, four on each side. The only feature from the prior structure to remain was the 16th-century bell tower. The facade has three copper statues by Orazio Provaglia, along with four evangelist statues attributed to Giovanni Tedeschi. The church is presently closed to the public and only open to prearranged tours.

This first chapel, hosts a canvas of the Beatified Archangel Canetoli refuses the role of archbishop of Florence from Giuliano de’ Medici by Ercole Graziani the Younger. The flanking statues of Saints Augustine and Jerome are sculpted by Tedeschi.

The next chapel has four sculptures by Tedeschi and Clemente Molli. An altarpiece depicts the Resurrection by Giovanni Andrea Donducci (il Mastellata) .

The third chapel has an altarpiece of the Madonna della Vittoria or Madonna del Monte (14th century) attributed to Lippo di Dalmasio or perhaps Simone de’Crocifissi while the vault frescoes are by the 19th century painters Alessandro Guardassoni and Luigi del Samoggia, crowned by the Pope via a formal decree in 1875.

The fourth chapel has a large canvas depicting The Miracle of the Beirut Crucifix (1579) by Jacopo Coppi also known as Jacopo del Meglio. There is also a Virgin at the Temple of St Thomas Becket of Canterbury (mid-1500s) by Girolamo da Treviso. Becket had studied in Bologna. One of the masterpieces of art in the church is the polyptcyh by Vitale da Bologna from 1353. It shows the Virgin being crowned in between two saints.

The first chapel on the left has a canvas of St John the Baptists and Saints (1532) by il Garofalo. The next chapel has an Ascension (1600s) by Carlo Bononi restored by Camillo Tarozzi. Just before the third chapel is this skilfully carved walnut pulpit from 1926 by Carlo Bordoni and Ferdinando Rossi.

The third chapel has a canvas depicting the Crucifixion and Saints (1539) by Innocenzo da Imola, flanked by sculptures by Andrea Guerra and Giovanni Tedeschi. The last chapel on the transept presents Alessandro Tiarini’s Nativity scene which sources indicate may have been destined for the main altar.

Right in the center of the nave is a marble tablet marking the tomb of the painter Guercino, buried here in 1666.

The altar is the work of Camillo Ambrosi. Above and behind are four paintings of prophets while the main altarpiece depicts Jesus the Savior in Glory, the painting was a collaboration between Giovanni Francesco Gessi and Guido Reni. There are also four paintings depict the Story of The Crucifix of Beirut, again another collaboration work between Giacomo Cavedone and Francesco Brizzi.

The Story of the Crucifix of Beirut is a tale recounted in Jacobus de Voragine's Golden Legend, tells of events of year 320 in the Roman city of Berytus (Beirut). A stolen crucifix begins to bleed and causes the local population (Jews) who had been persecuting Christians, to convert.

== Sources ==
- iguidez guide
- Bolognawelcome guide
- Bianconi, Girolamo (1820). Guida del Forestiere per la citta di Bologna e suoi sobborghi:. Bologna: Annessio Nobili. pp. 153–160.
