= Mystic Marriage of Saint Catherine (Veronese, 1575) =

Painting by Paolo Veronese

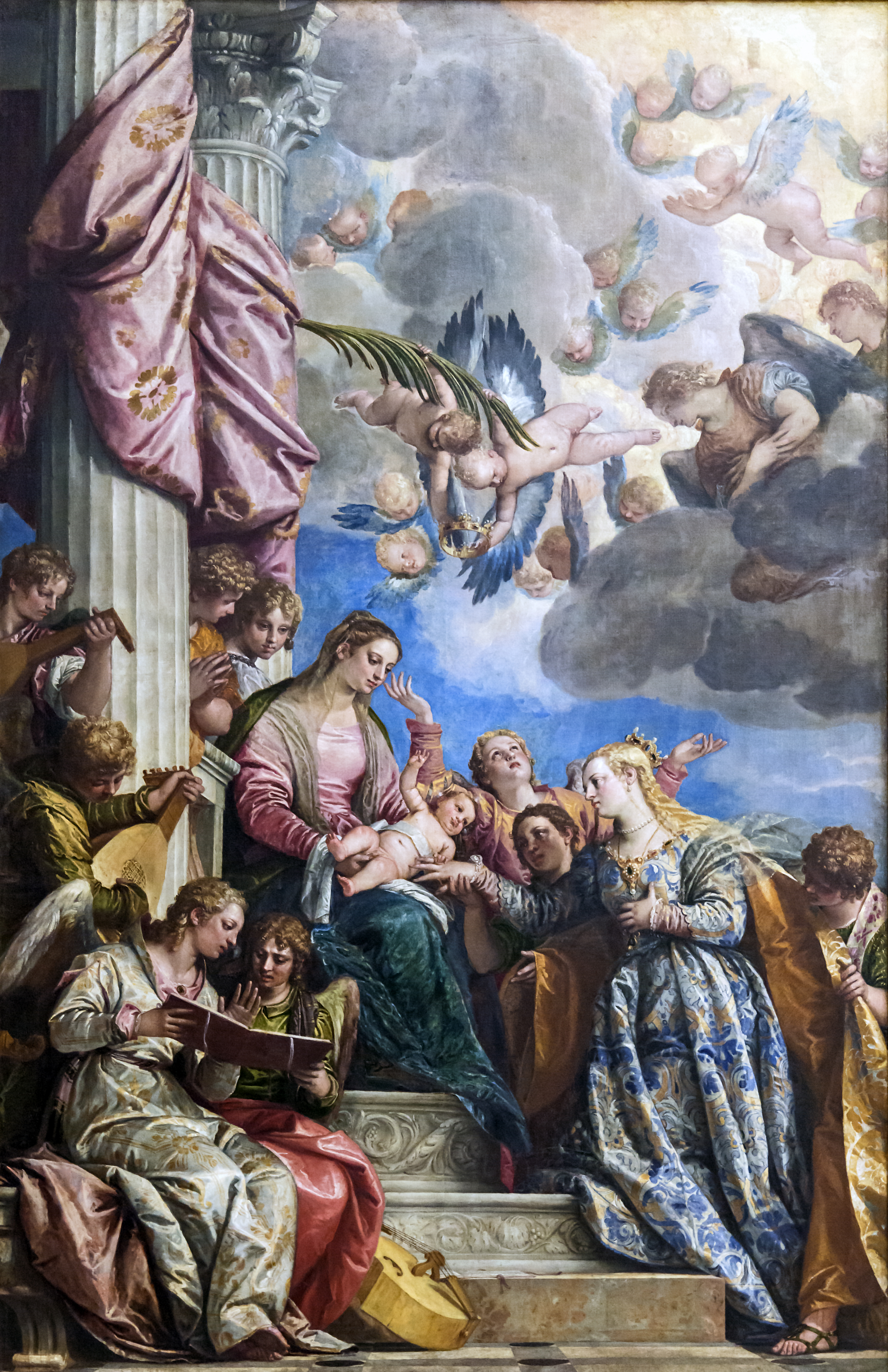
Paolo Veronese, Mystic Marriage of Saint Catherine, 1571, Gallerie dell'Accademia, Venice

The Mystic Marriage of Saint Catherine is a c.1575 oil-on-canvas painting by Paolo Veronese, produced as the high altarpiece for Santa Caterina church in Venice. It remained there until the First World War, during which it was moved to its present home in the city's Gallerie dell'Accademia

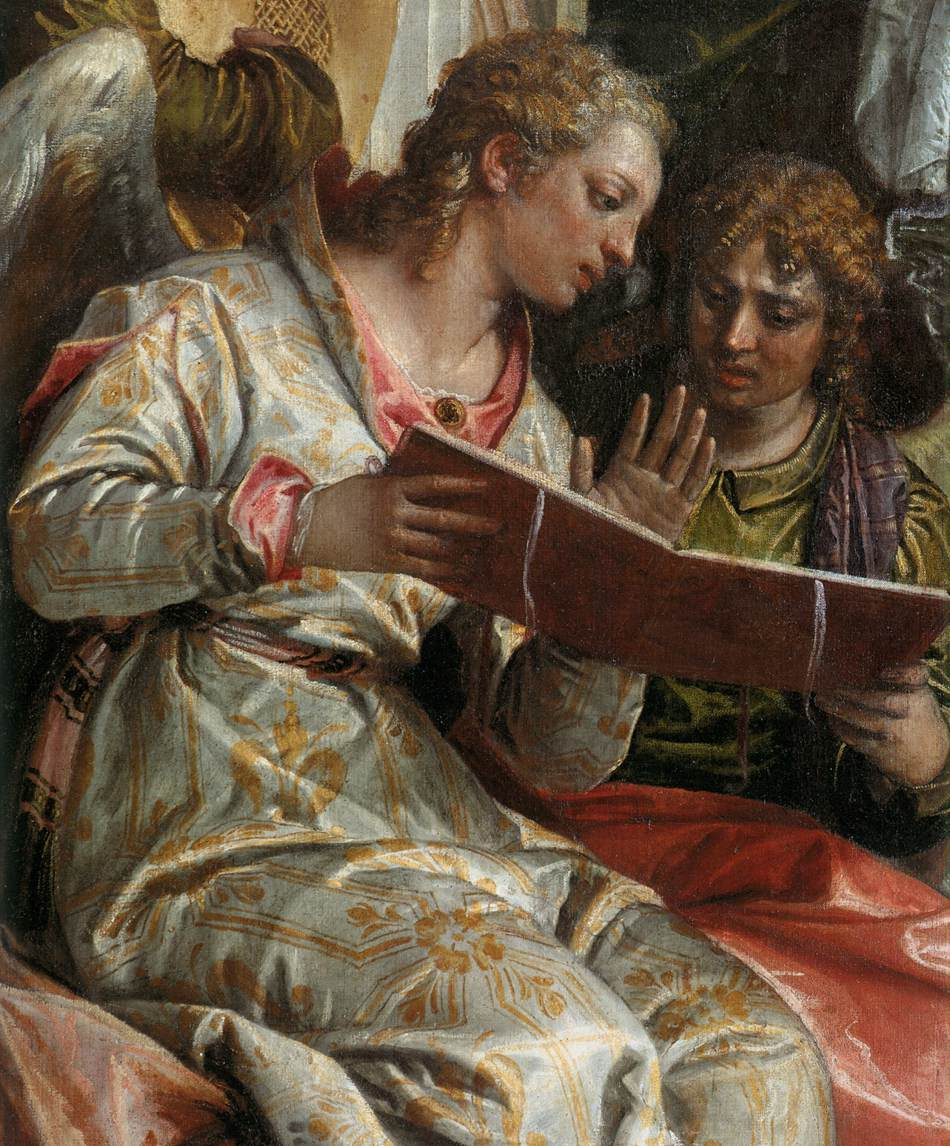
Detail

It shows the Mystic Marriage of Saint Catherine, a subject repeatedly returned to by the artist, such as in a c.1547–1550 work by the artist. It is one of the most successful variants on Titian's 1519–1526 Pesaro Altarpiece for Santa Maria Gloriosa dei Frari, also in Venice, using the same asymmetric diagonal composition with the Madonna and Child in a stepped throne to the left of centre. A pair of Corinthian columns behind the throne represent the pillars of the faith.
