= Santa Caterina, Venice =

Former church

Coordinates: 45.4433°N 12.3363°E

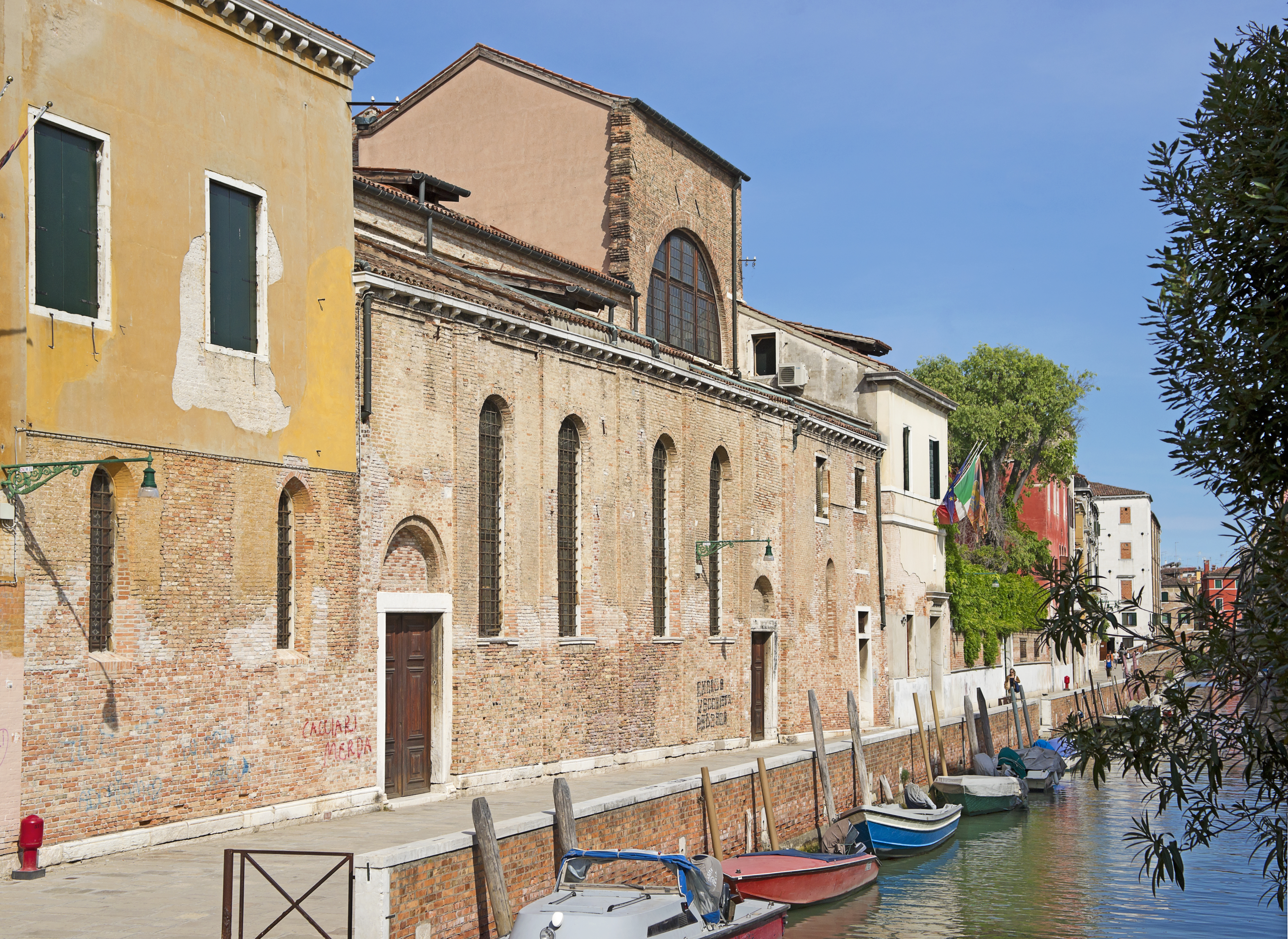

Santa Caterina is a deconsecrated Roman Catholic church in the Cannaregio district of Venice, now forming part of the Liceo Marco Foscarini complex, to which it was joined when the Augustinian monks took over the running of the school.

The church was begun by the "frati del Sacco" (Order of Penitence of Jesus Christ) early in the 13th century, but they were unable to complete it before their suppression in 1274. The building passed to a wealthy merchant, who gave it to Botolotta Giustinian, who in turn gave it to a group of Augustinian monks, who completed it by the 15th century and dedicated it to Catherine of Alexandria.

On Catherine's feast day the Doge of Venice would come to the church to celebrate the "Festa dei Dotti", whilst it also originally housed Palma il Giovane's Saint Catherine's Mother Consulting Wise Men about her Daughter's Marriage (now in the Palazzo Patriarcale), Tintoretto's c.1585 cycle Scenes from the Life of Saint Catherine (now also in the Palazzo Patriarcale) and Paolo Veronese's 1575 Mystic Marriage of Saint Catherine (now in the Gallerie dell'Accademia). In the 1970s the church was devastated by a fire during restoration works, destroying the rest of its works of art.

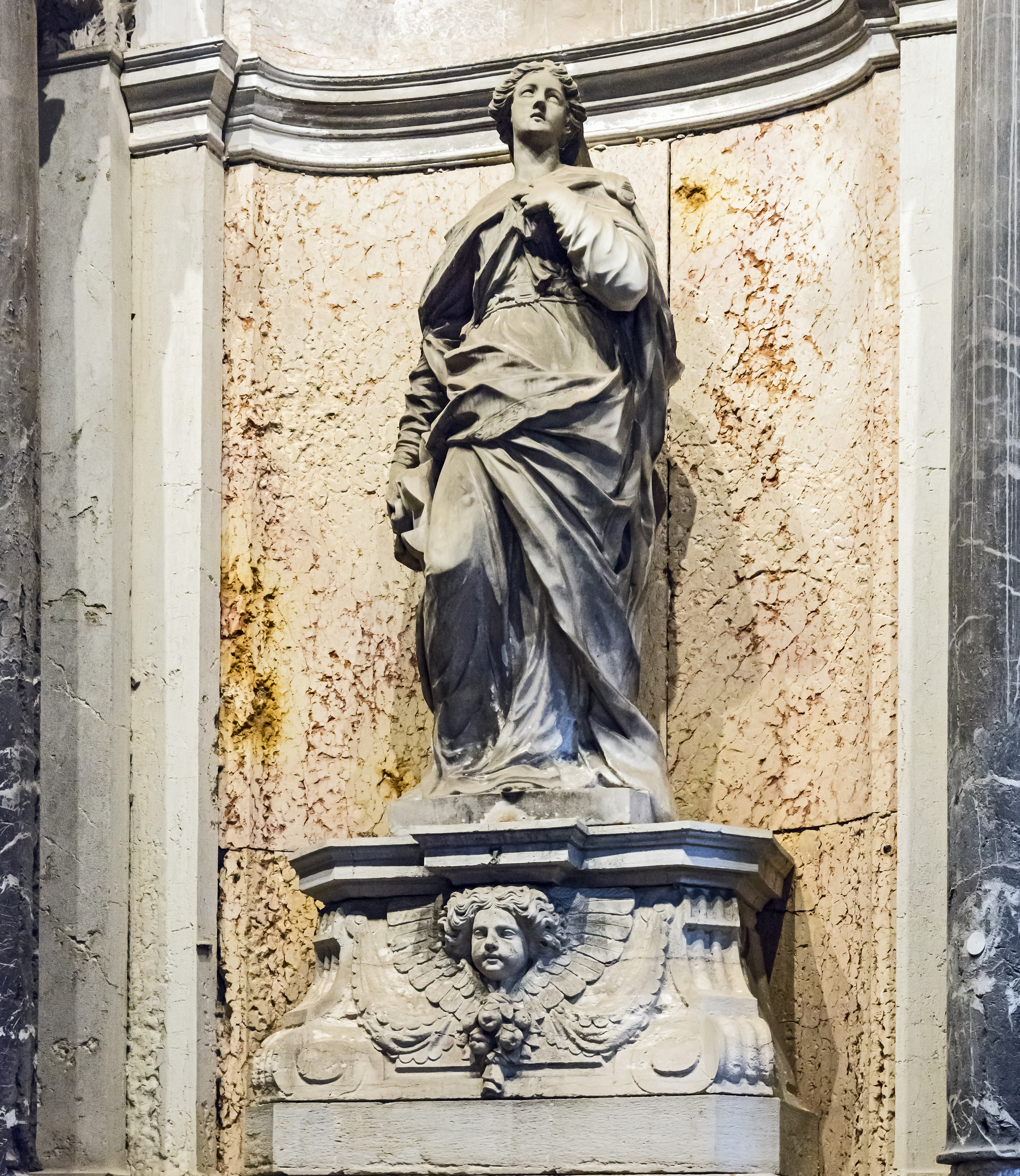
Statue of Saint Catherine

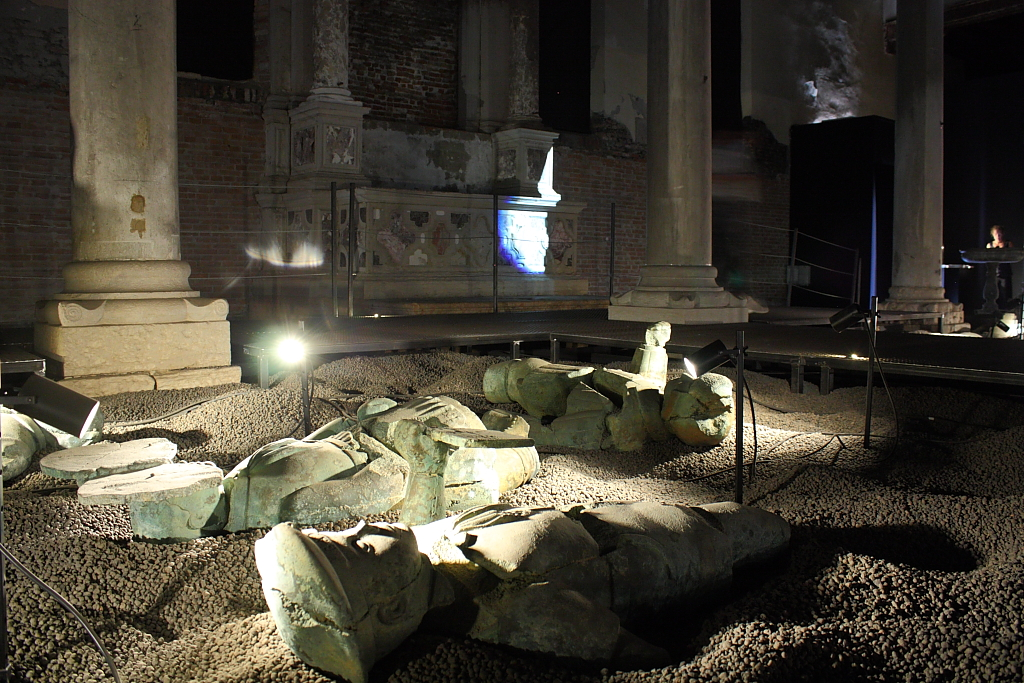
Interior with installation art by Grisha Bruskin

== Bibliography ==
- (in Italian) Marcello Brusegan, Le chiese di Venezia, Edizioni Newton Compton, Roma, 2008.
