= Vitale da Bologna =

Italian painter (1289–1359)

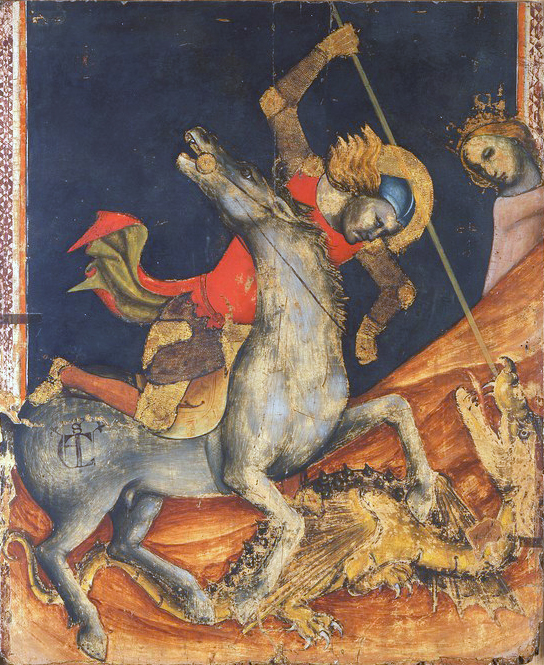
St. George and the Dragon

Vitale da Bologna (c. 1309–1360), also known as Vitale di Aymo de' Cavalli or Vitale degli Equi, was an Italian painter of the Early Renaissance.

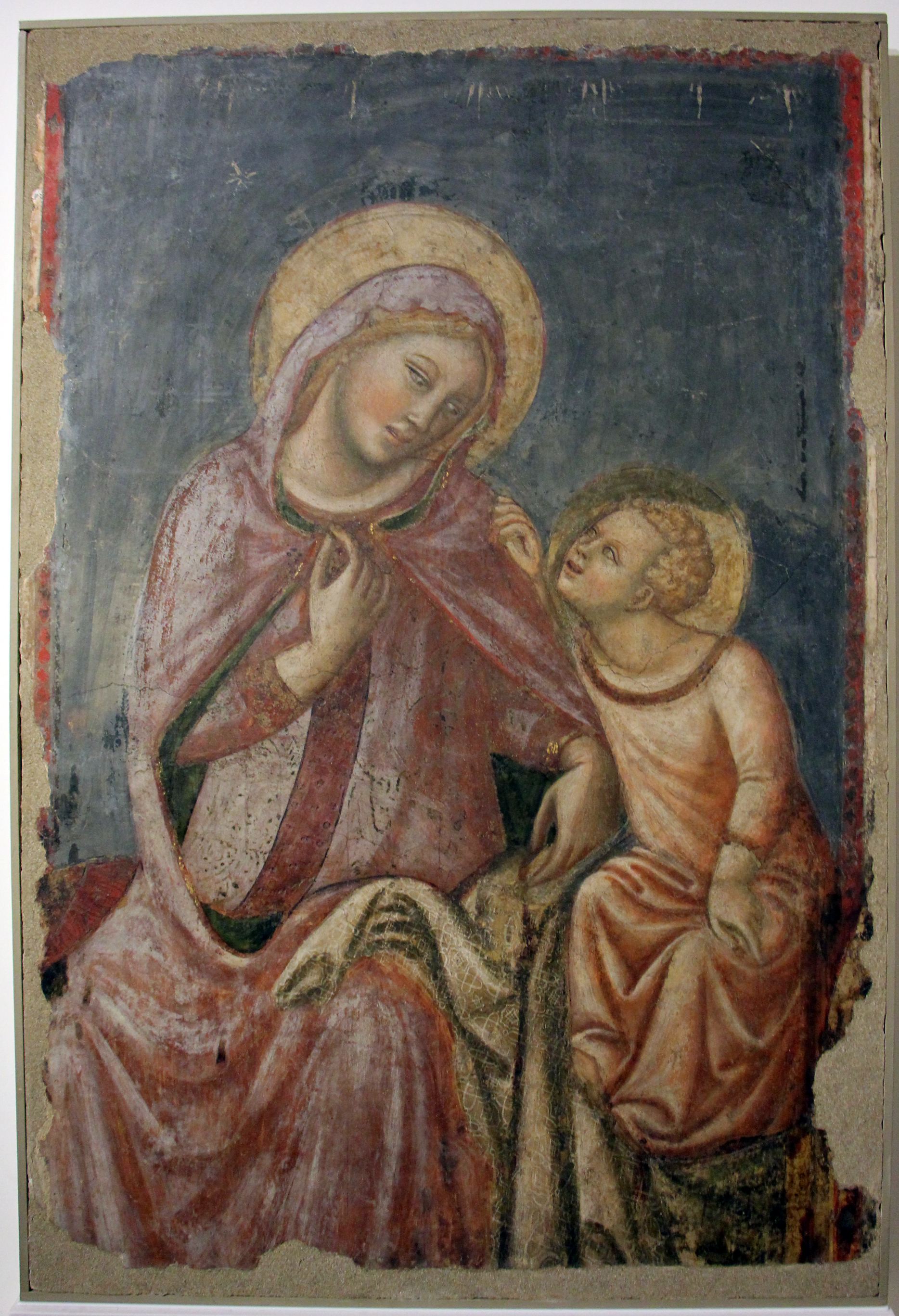
Madonna del Ricamo

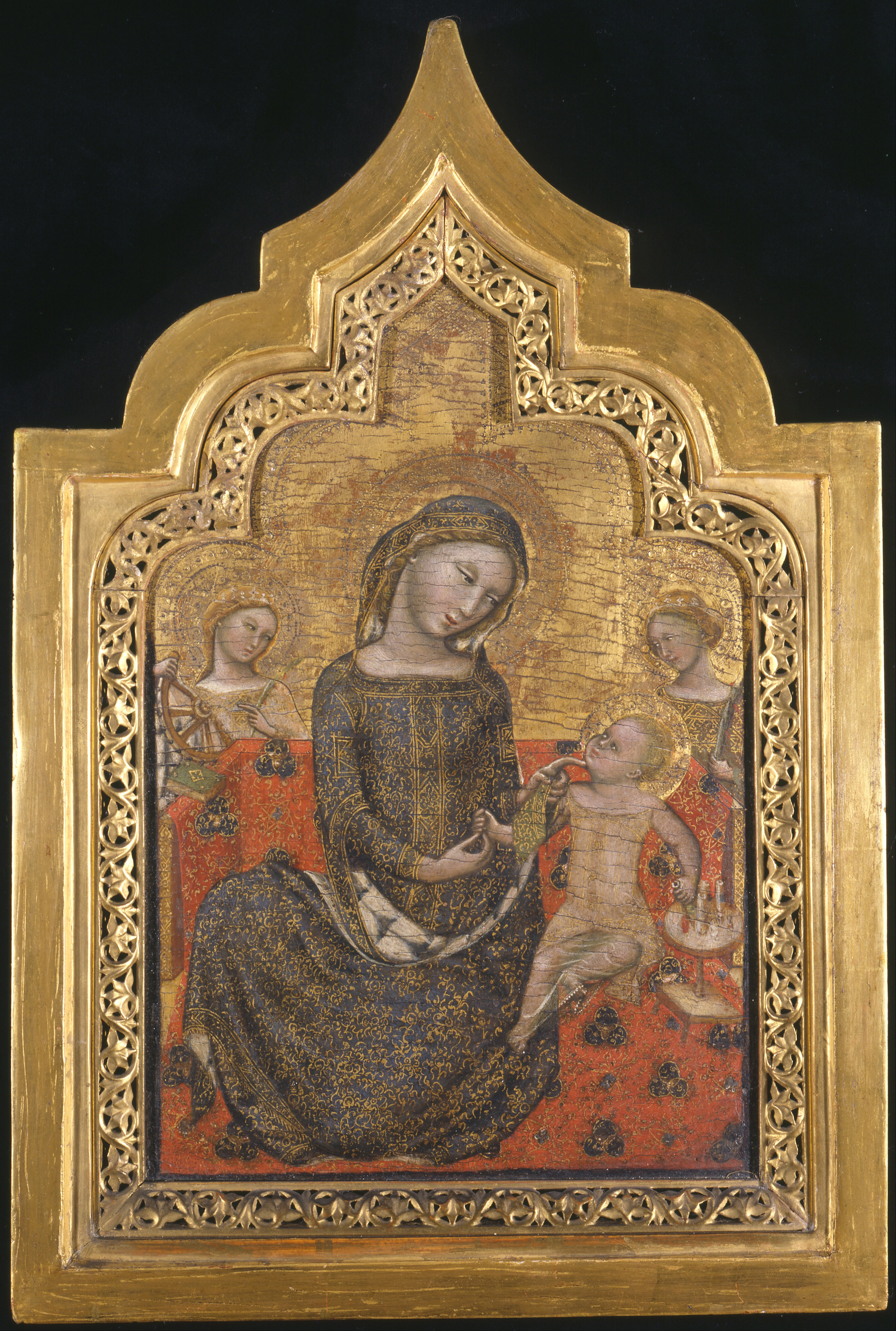
Madonna of Humility

He is a representative of the 14th-century school of painting in Bologna, his natal city and the place where he was most active. Surviving works in Bologna include a polyptych in the church of San Salvatore (1353); fresco fragments in the right apsidal chapel of Santa Maria dei Servi; and a fresco of Madonna and Child in San Michele dei Leprosetti. Vitale was also active in Pomposa, where he painted the frescoes in the apse of the Pomposa Abbey in Ferrara, completing a set of now-lost statues for Ferrara Cathedral and a confraternity altarpiece now in the Vatican Museums, and in Udine, where he was called to work for the Patriarch of Aquileia, Bertrand de Saint Geniès. In Udine, he painted a fresco cycle for the main chapel of the Duomo, as well as frescoes in the adjacent confraternity chapel of St Nicholas. He is last registered in Bologna in 1359 and is thought to have died in December of that year or early 1360.

His masterwork is the panel with St. George and the Dragon, held in the Pinacoteca Nazionale di Bologna. Also notable is the Madonna dei Denti ("Madonna of the Teeth", signed and dated 1345), in the Davia-Bargellini Museum in Bologna.

Universally attributed to him are the large Nativity fresco originally from the confraternity church of Santa Maria della Mezzaratta in the Bolognese countryside, now detached and conserved in the Pinacoteca Nazionale di Bologna, and the fresco known as the Madonna del Ricamo ("Embroidering Madonna"), originally from San Francesco, Bologna, and now in deposit at the Museo della Storia di Bologna.
