= San Giuliano, Bologna =

Church in Bologna, Italy

Coordinates: 44.485215°N 11.355411°E

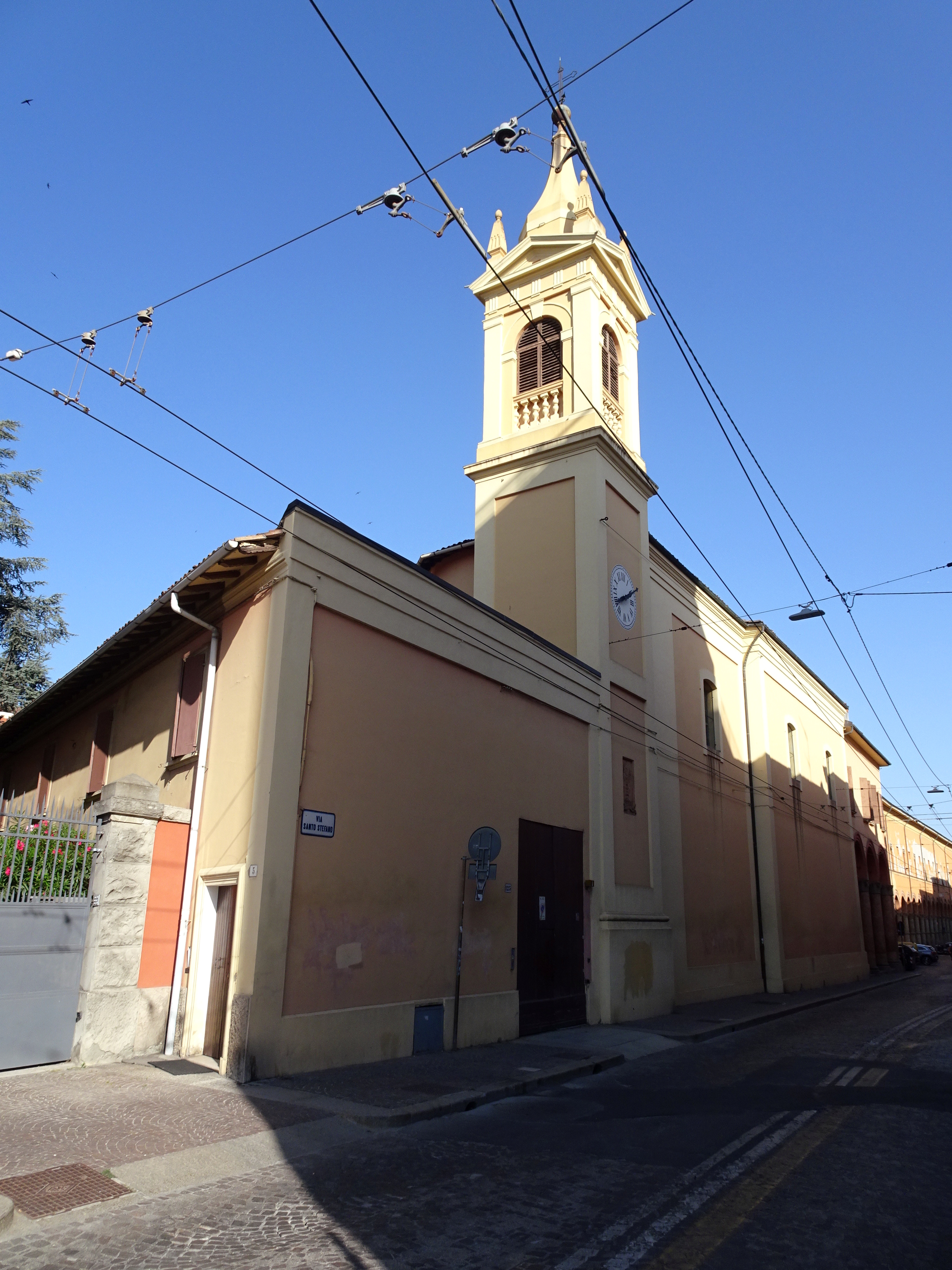
San Giuliano

San Giuliano is a late-Baroque style, Roman Catholic church located on Via Santo Stefano #121 in central Bologna, Italy.

== History ==
A church at the site was present since the 12th century, and by the next century it was affiliated with a hostel or hospital for pilgrims. It was associated with Vallombrosan monks from Castiglione dei Pepoli until the mid-15th-century when the monks left, and the church was made a parish church under the bishop. The church was suppressed for some years after 1798.

The church and bell-tower were reconstructed in 1778–1781 by Angelo Venturoli. The stucco-work in the interior is by G. Rossi and A. Moghini. The altarpiece depicting the Evangelists and Prophets (1781) was completed by Ubaldo Gandolfi. The late 19th-century frescoes in the ceiling and apse were painted by Alessandro Guardassoni and Luigi Samoggia. The rectory has a fresco depicting the life of the Cardinal Gabriele Paleotti (circa 1610) by Alessandro Tiarini.
