= Madonna and Child with Saint George =

C.1530 painting by Antonio da Correggio

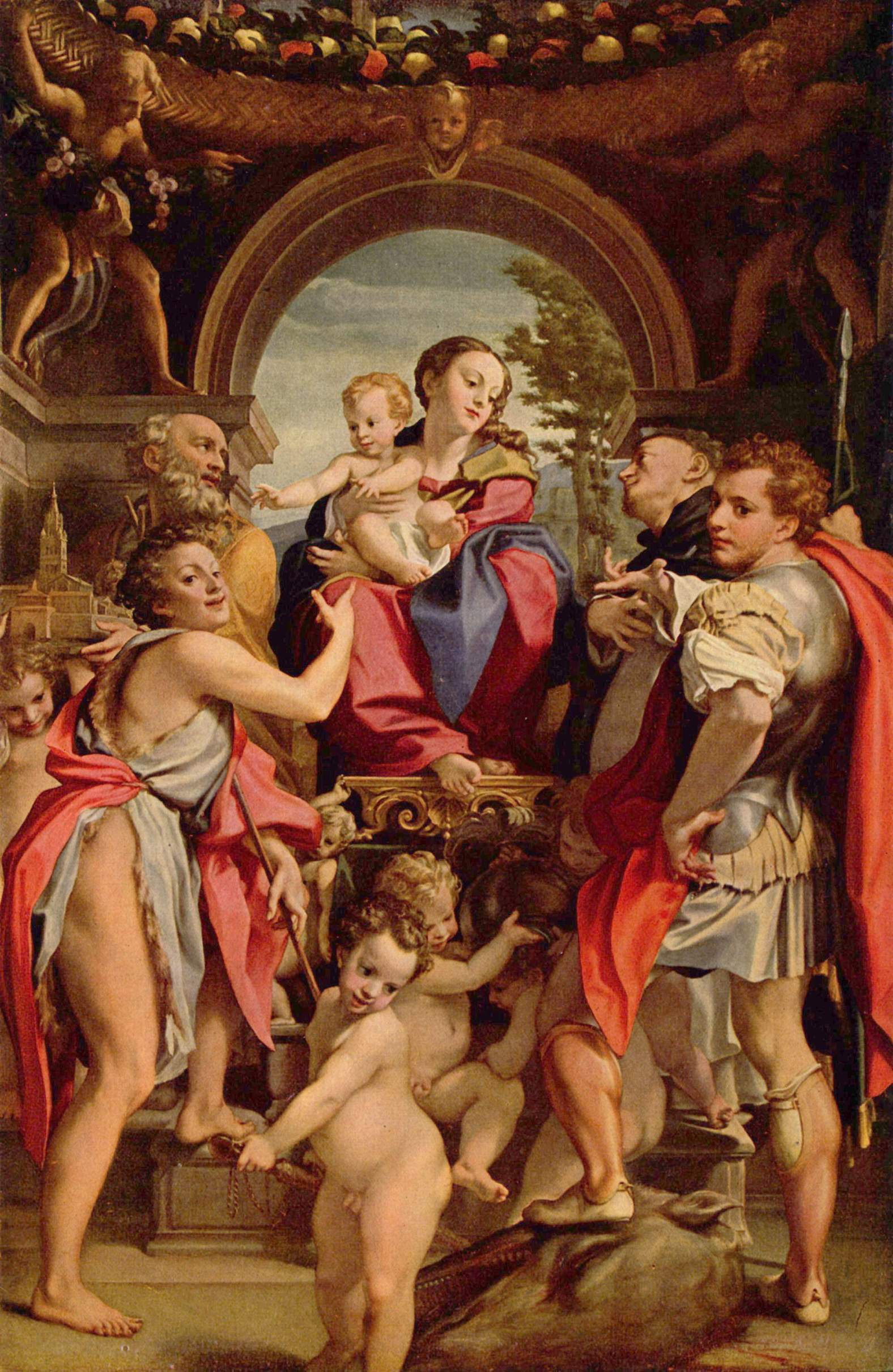
- Artist: Correggio
- Year: c. 1530
- Medium: oil on panel
- Dimensions: 285 cm × 190 cm (112 in × 75 in)
- Location: Gemäldegalerie Alte Meister, Dresden

Madonna and Child with Saint George (Madonna di San Giorgio) is an oil on panel painting by Correggio dating to c. 1530 and now in the Gemäldegalerie in Dresden.

It features the Madonna and Child in the centre under a floral dome which draws on the Madonna della Vittoria by Mantegna. To the left are Geminianus (patron saint of Modena, shown in bishop's robes and holding a model of the city assisted by a putto) and John the Baptist. To the right are saint Peter Martyr (patron saint of the confraternity for which it was painted, wearing the white and black habit of the Dominicans and with a knife in his head) and Saint George (with the dragon's head under his left foot and his sword and helmet held by three putti).

== History ==
It was commissioned as an altarpiece for the high altar of the oratory of the confraternity of San Pietro Martire in Modena. It can be definitively dated thanks to the secure dating of the San Sebastiano Madonna to the mid-1520s. It was probably the last religious work he completed, in parallel with his final contributions to the ceiling of Parma Cathedral. Two preparatory sketches survive.

Copies of it were made by the painters Girolamo Conti and Bartolomeo Passerotti, whilst Peter Paul Rubens also made a red-chalk sketch of it. Also recorded by Giorgio Vasari, the painting was acquired in 1649 by Francesco I d'Este, who commissioned a copy of it from Guercino to replace it in its original home in the oratory. Just after it entered the d'Este collection it was praised by Padre Ottonelli and Francesco Scannelli.In 1746 Francesco III d'Este sold it and several other paintings to Frederick Augustus II.
