= Jacopo Coppi =

Italian painter

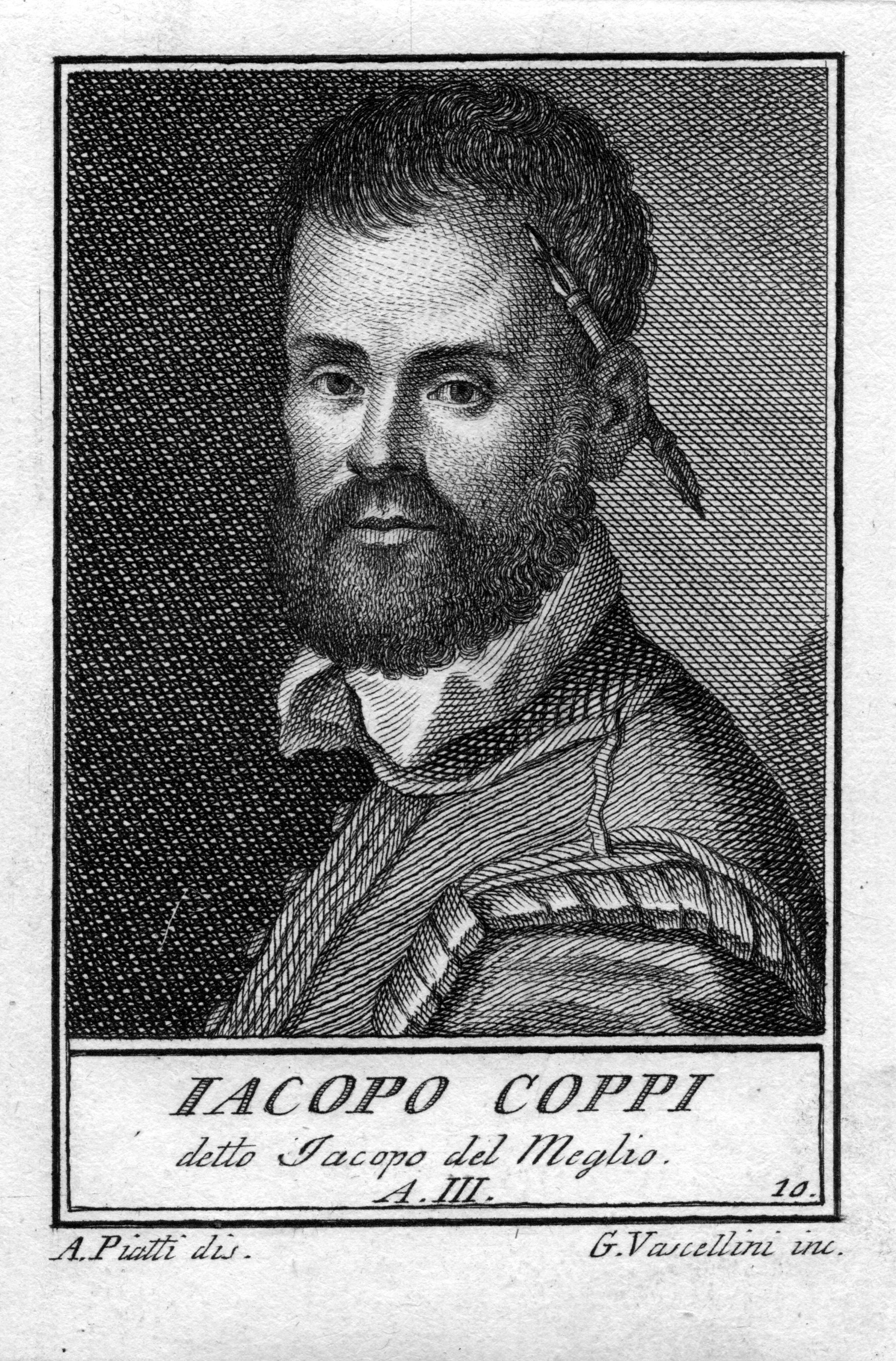

Jacopo Coppi, also called Giacomo Coppi or "'Jacopo del Meglio'" ("the Best") (Peretola, 1546 – 1591) was an Italian painter, mainly active in Florence and Rome in a Mannerist style. Other sources call him Giacinto Coppi.

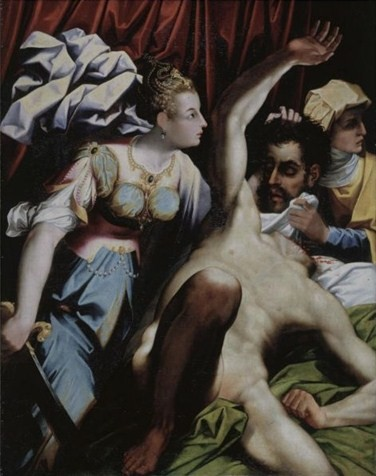
Judith with decapitated Holofernes

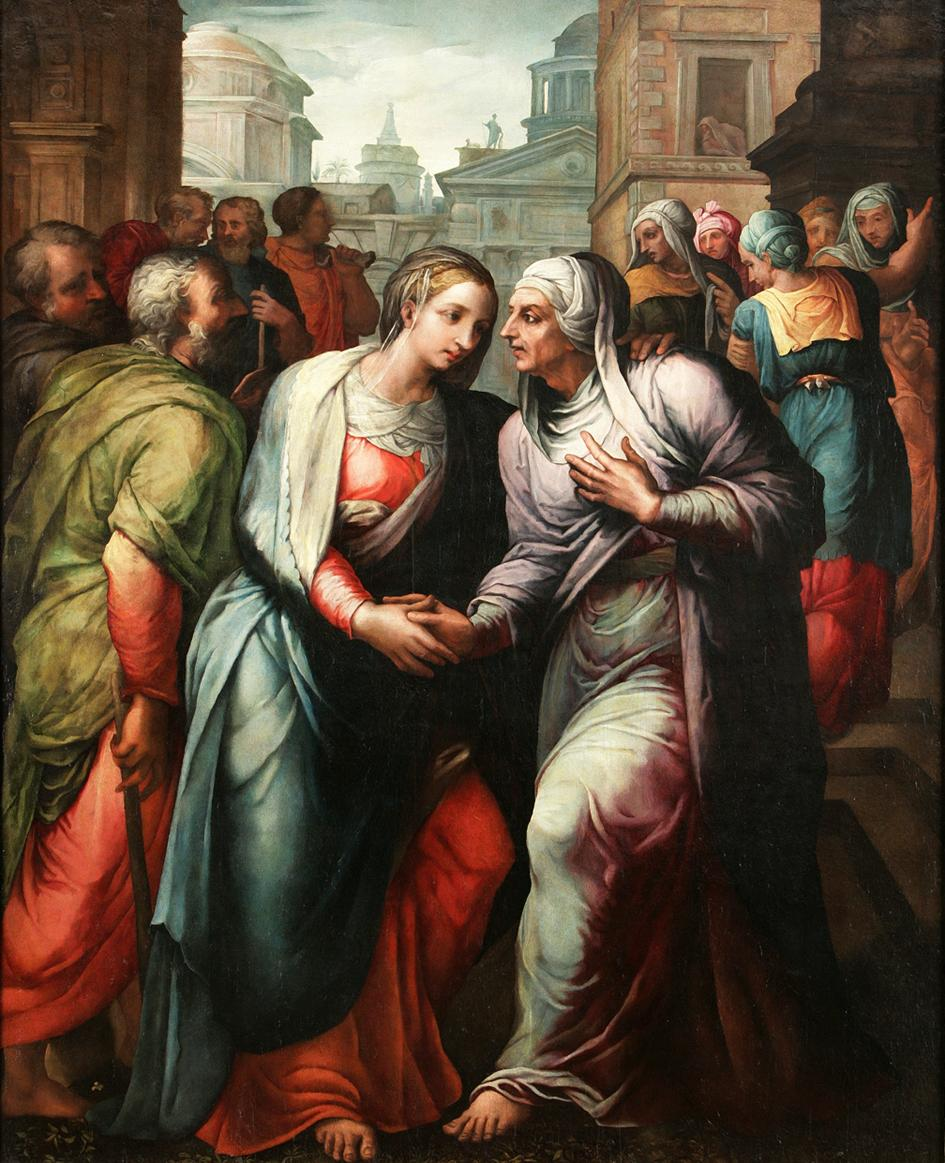
The Visitation

== Biography ==
He was one of the team of painters under Giorgio Vasari engaged in the decoration of the Studiolo of Francesco I de' Medici in the Palazzo Vecchio, Florence. For the room, he depicted the Invention of Gunpowder and the Family of Darius before Alexander the Great.

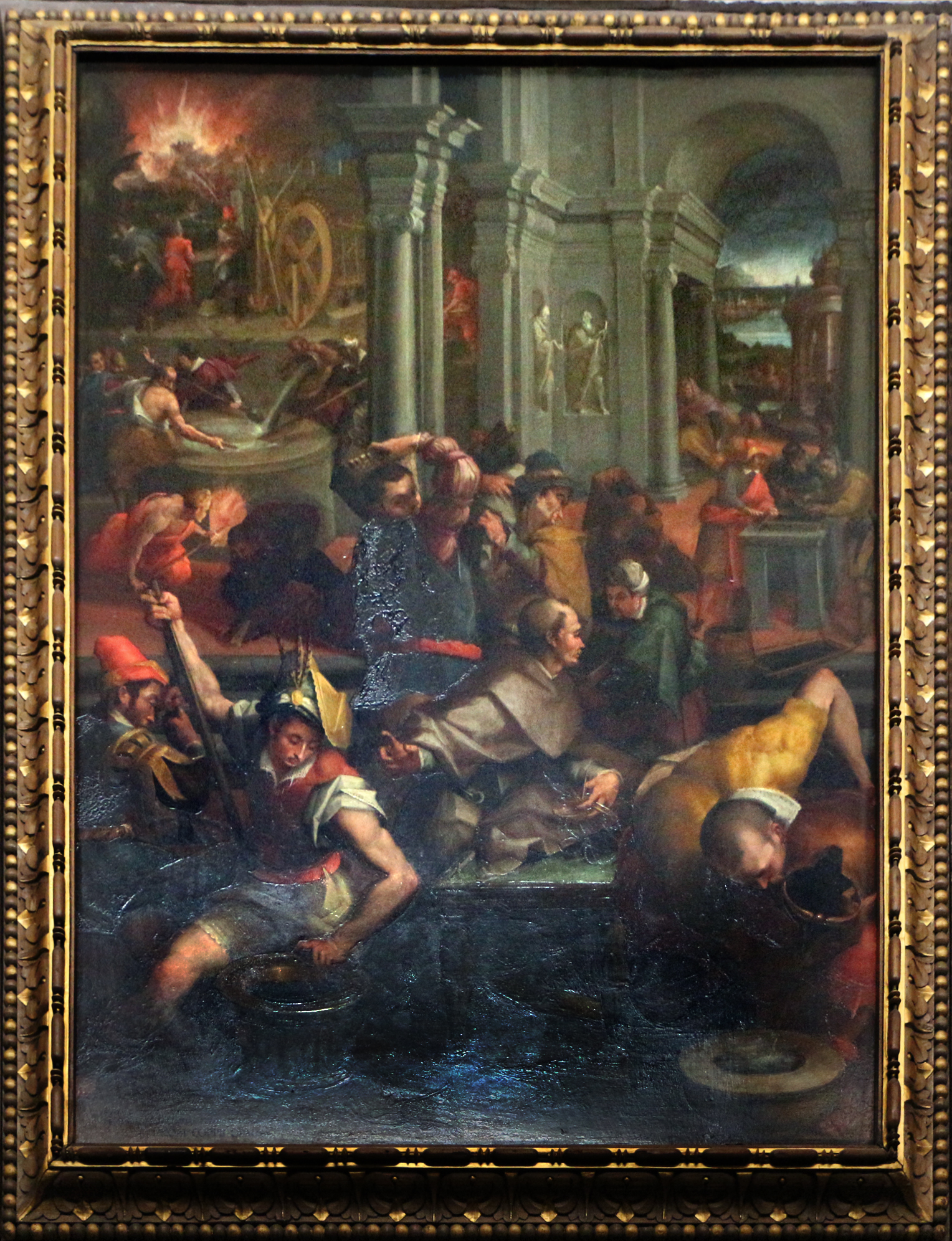
Invention of Gunpowder

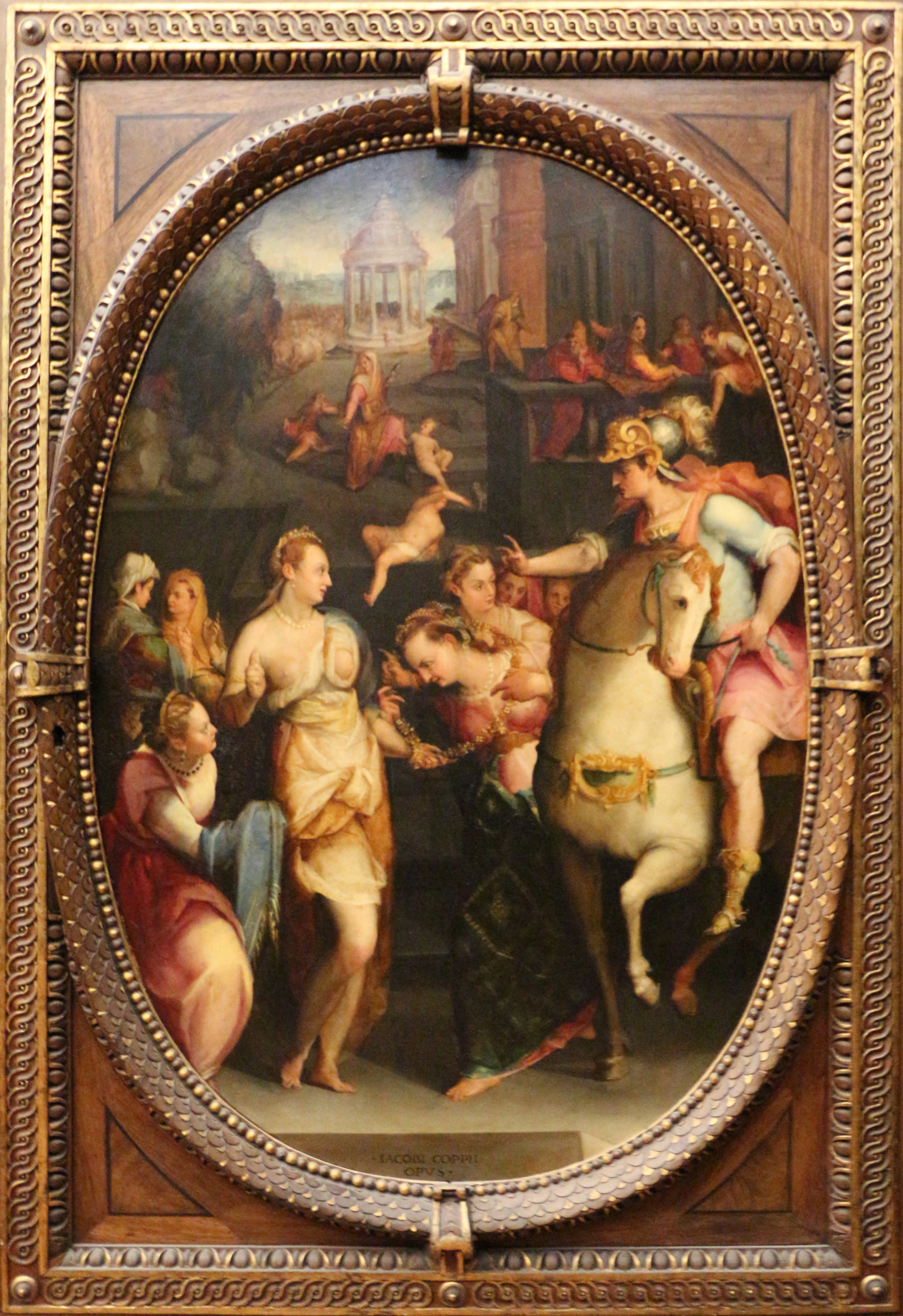
Family of Darius before Alexander the Great

Some of the sources dispute the identity of Coppi and Meglio. He is said to have painted in Rome and Bologna.

Among his works are frescoes (1577) for the tribune of San Pietro in Vincoli in Rome; a painting of Ecce Homo for the church of Santa Croce in Florence, and a canvas of the Redeemer (1579) for the church of San Salvatore in Bologna.
