= San Michele dei Leprosetti =

Greek-Catholic church in Bologna, Italy

Coordinates: 44.493663°N 11.349455°E

External videos
- A church for Bologna's Ukrainians, [Italian: Una Chiesa per gli Ucraini bolognesi] Dodici Porte. 26 November 2009

San Michele dei Leprosetti is a Greek-Catholic church serving the Ukrainian community in Bologna, Italy. It is situated on the piazza of the same name (formerly Piazza Asinara, then Piazza Brusato) in the Quartiere San Vitale district. Records indicate that the original church burned down in 1210 and was rebuilt in 1361.

It was consecrated to the Ukrainian Greek Catholic Church in November 2009.

It contains a fresco of Madonna con bambino by Vitale da Bologna, the altarpiece L'arcangelo Michele raccomanda Bologna alla Vergine by Francesco Gessi and the canvas Madonna e santi by Gaetano Gandolfi.

== See also ==
- Roman Catholic Archdiocese of Bologna
