= Carlo Antonio Rambaldi =

Italian painter (1680–1717)

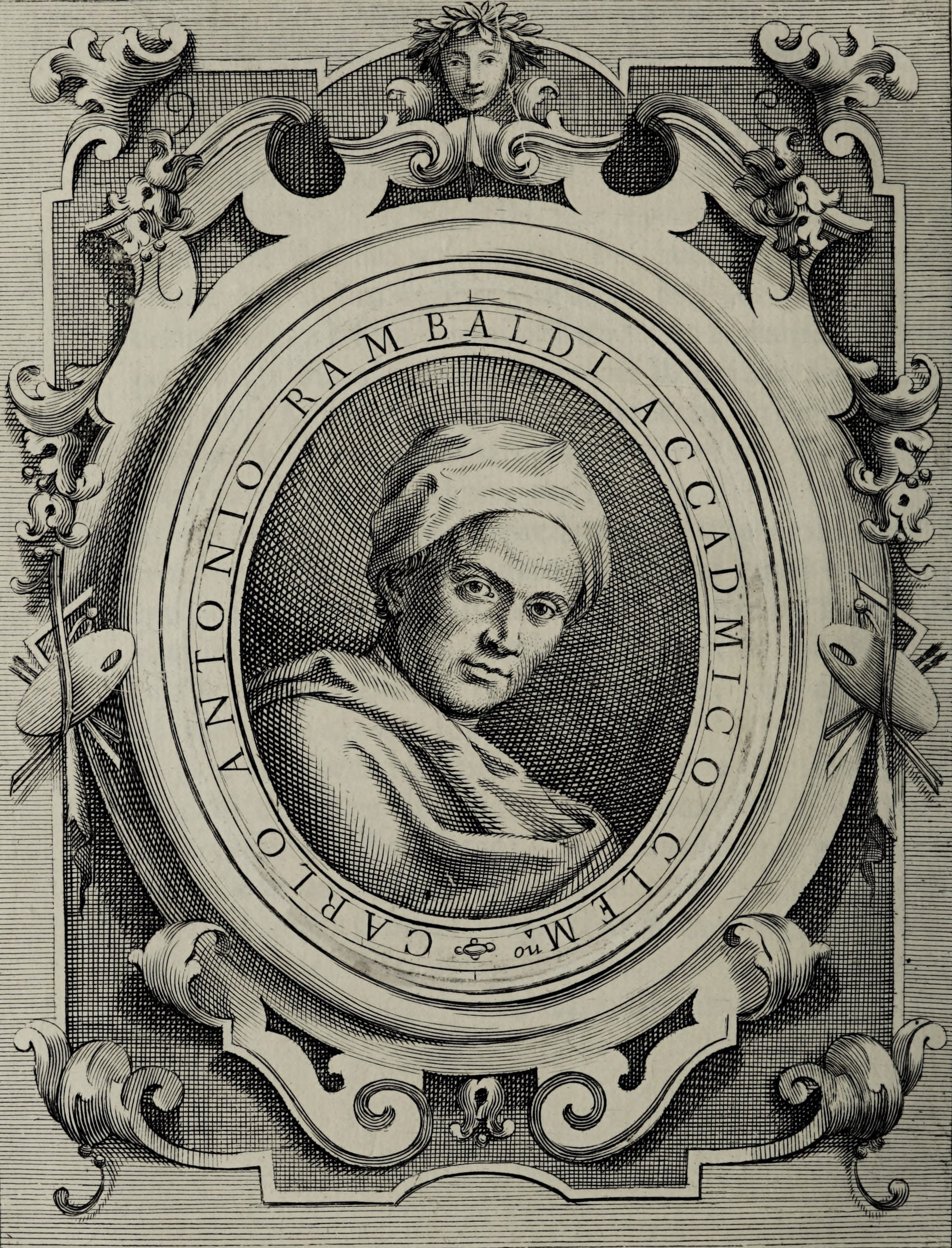
Carlo Antonio Rambaldi

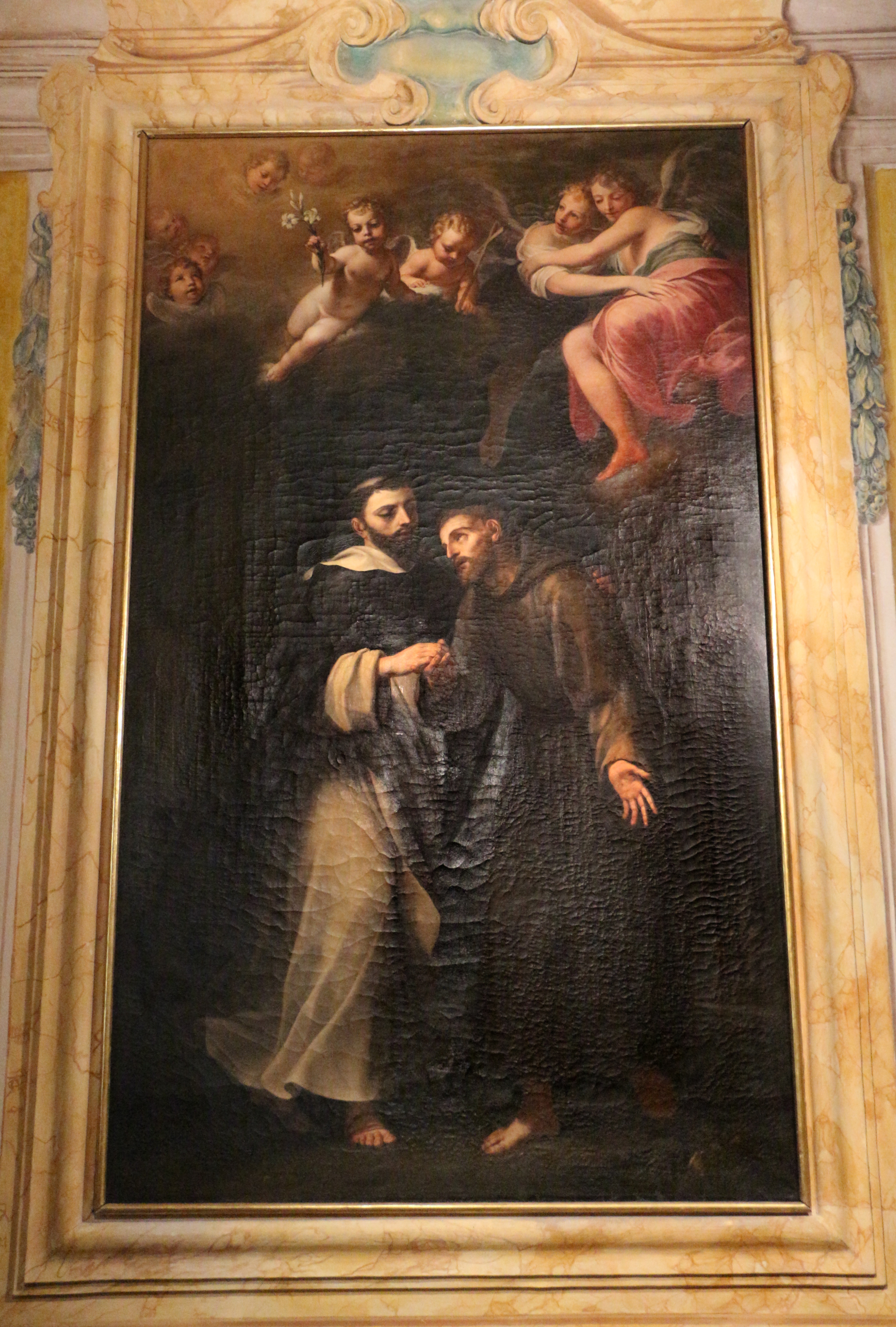
Saints Dominic and Francis, Palazzo Buonaccorsi, Macerata

Carlo Antonio Rambaldi (4 November 1680 – 16 October 1717) was an Italian painter of the Baroque period, active in his native Bologna.

Known as a figure painter, he was a pupil of Domenico Maria Viani. He painted in Macerata, Rome, and Turin. In Bologna, he painted in the Sacristy of the church of San Petronio. For his work in Piacenza, he was awarded a knighthood. Returning to Bologna in 1717 with his wife, he drowned in the Taro river. He painted a Death of St. Joseph for the church of Santi Gregorio e Siro; a Visitation for San Giuseppe Sposo; and a St. Francis Xavier for the church of Santa Lucia.
