= Baptism of Christ (Annibale Carracci) =

Painting by Annibale Carracci

The Baptism of Christ is an oil painting on canvas executed in 1585 by the Italian Baroque painter Annibale Carracci.

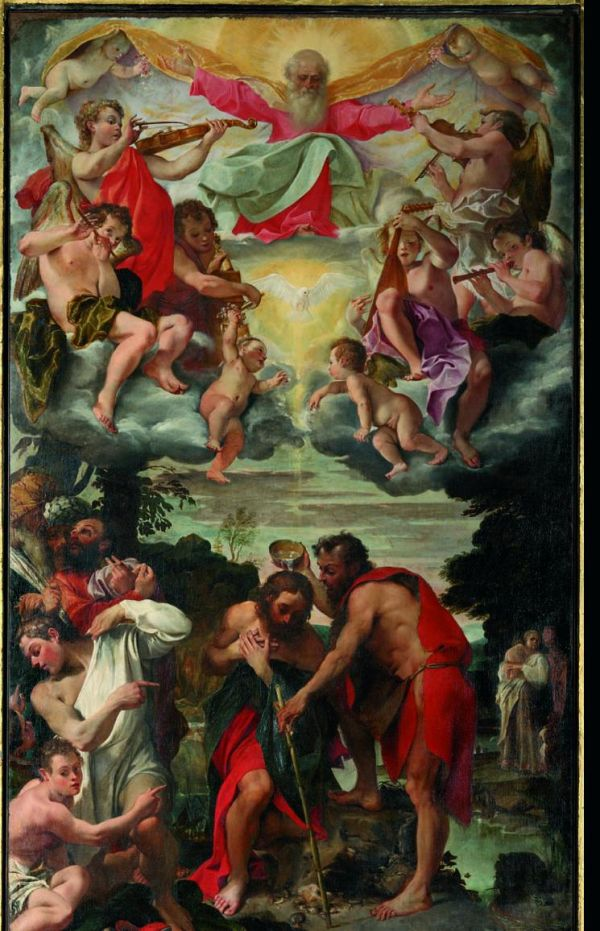
Baptism of Christ (1585) by Annibale Carracci

== History of the painting ==
The work was commissioned in 1583 by Giacomo Canobbi, professor of law at the University of Bologna, for his chapel in the Santi Gregorio e Siro. He was licensed in 1585, the date that appears on the canvas.

This is the second public commission obtained by Annibale after the Crucifixion of 1583, now in the Santa Maria della Carità, Bologna.The Baptism is the only altarpiece made by the most famous of the Carracci before his move to Rome to have remained in its original location.

== Description ==
The Baptism is the first important manifestation of the rediscovery of Correggio who, between 1584 and 1587, occupied the artistic interests of Annibale Carracci.

The influence of Correggio is particularly evident in the upper part of the altarpiece, occupied by a choir of angel musicians, supported by material clouds, in the centre of which the Eternal Father appears. This part of the composition derives from Correggio's frescoes painted for the dome of Parma Cathedral.

The lower part of the painting, where the main event takes place, instead, seems to be still linked to the late Mannerist style then dominant among Bolognese painters. This can be seen above all from the artificiality of the poses of some of the characters depicted and especially from that of the catechumen on the left - which shows the Lord taking off his shirt to be baptized in turn - whose twisting is strongly unnatural.

In general, there is a fracture between the two parts of the canvas (also highlighted by the different luministic setting of the two sections) which is probably an indication of the uncertainties and the results of the young Annibale's research still in progress.

In the composition, in addition to the depiction of Baptism, there is a reference to the mystery of the Trinity: the Father, the dove, symbol of the Holy Spirit, and Jesus, the Son, are aligned on the middle axis of the painting. The Trinitarian allusion is echoed by the gesture of the onlooker's hand on the left (in a red coat) indicating the number three. The Canobbi chapel, in fact, was dedicated to both the Baptist and the Trinity.

Already in this first important example of Carracci's attention to the art of Allegri we can see Hannibal's effort to update the style: the angelic choir at the top, though derived from Correggio, is characterized by its domestic spirit, "almost a concertino staged [...] like a family celebration".

According to Malvasia, for this second public commission, Annibale would have availed himself of the help of his more experienced cousin Ludovico.

== Gallery ==
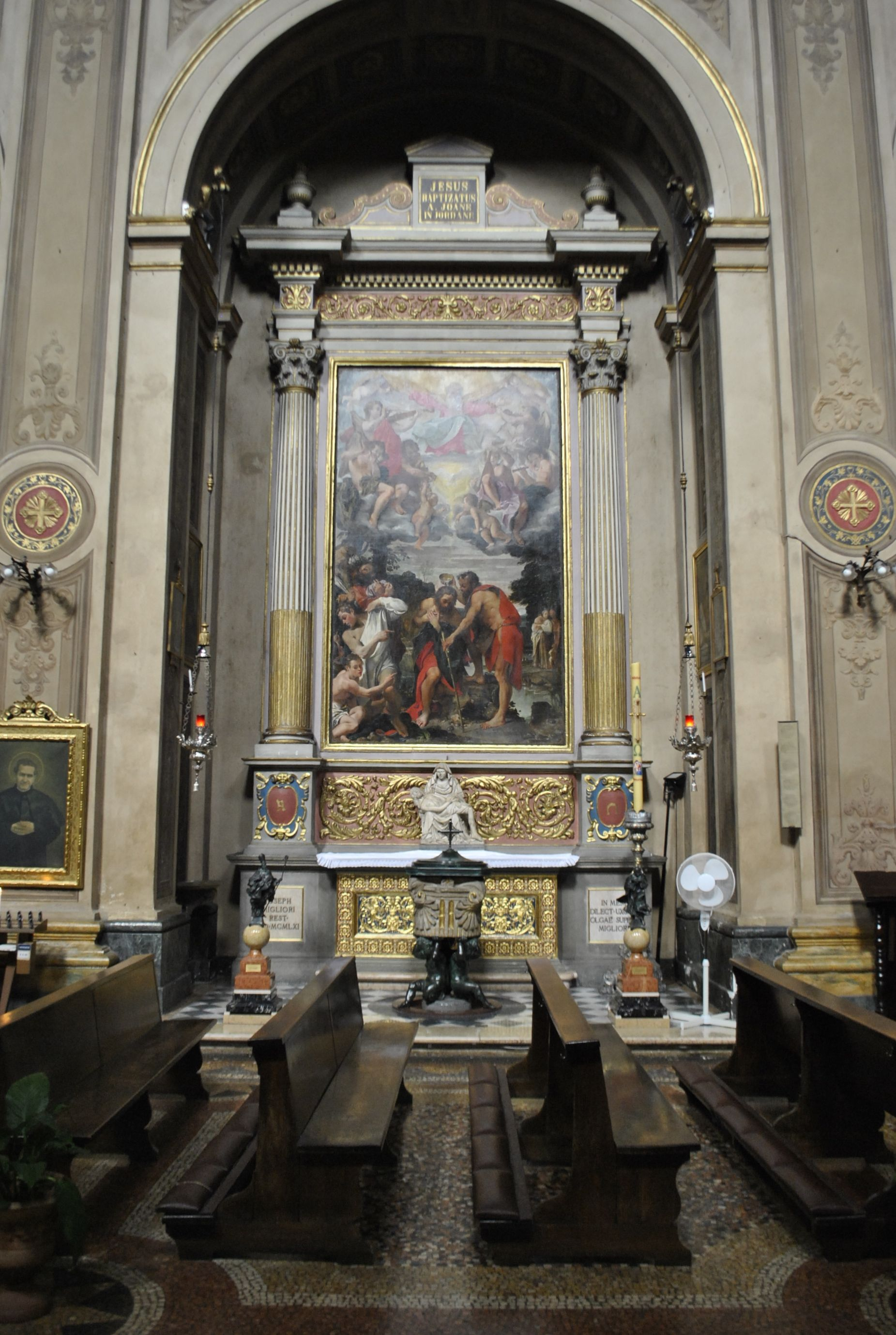
The Baptism in the church of Santi Gregorio e Siro in Bologna
