= Mystic Marriage of Saint Catherine (Veronese, c. 1547–1550) =

Painting by Paolo Veronese

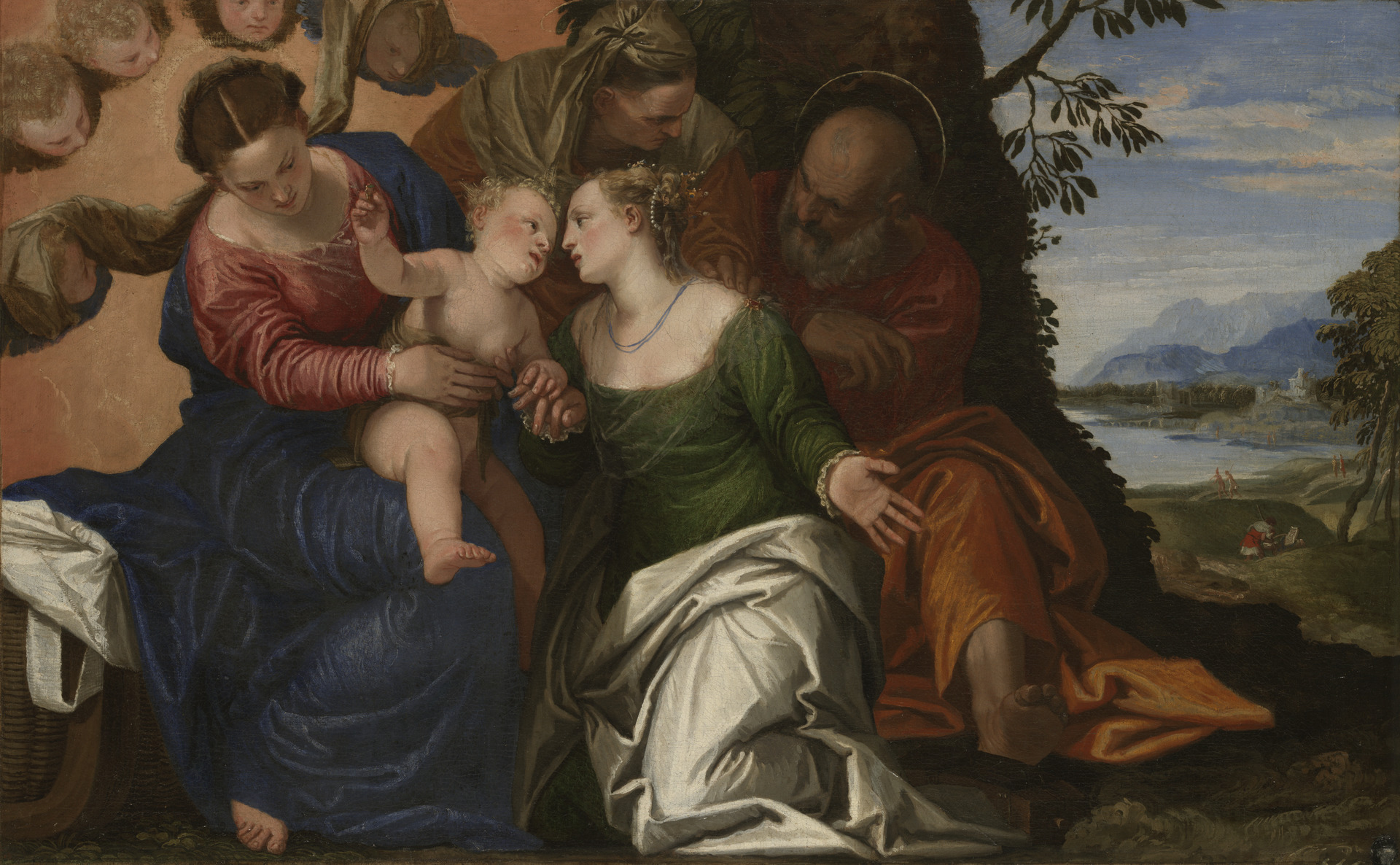
Mystic Marriage of Saint Catherine (c. 1547–1550) by Paolo Veronese

Mystic Marriage of Saint Catherine is an oil painting on canvas of c. 1547–1550 by the Italian Renaissance painter Paolo Veronese. It was in the Liechtenstein Collection by 1767 and was acquired in 1926 by Catherine Barker Spaulding Hickox, who in 1970 bequeathed it to its present owner, the Barker Welfare Foundation. It is currently on long-term loan from the Foundation to the Yale University Art Gallery.
