= Luigi Samoggia =

Italian painter

Luigi Samoggia (1811–1904) was an Italian painter and restorer of paintings, active mainly in Bologna.

He mainly painted fresco decoration for palaces, churches, and theaters. He worked in the Palazzo Malvezzi-Medici, Santi Gregorio e Siro, Santa Maria della Carità, San Salvatore, Corpus Domini, San Giuliano, and the Palazzo Legnani. He painted in the theaters of Viterbo, Macerata, Fabriano, and Pesaro.
