= Cesare Mauro Trebbi =

Italian painter

- Born: 1847; Bologna, Italy
- Died: 1931 (aged 83–84); Bologna, Italy
- Known for: Painting, especially in churches; lithographs

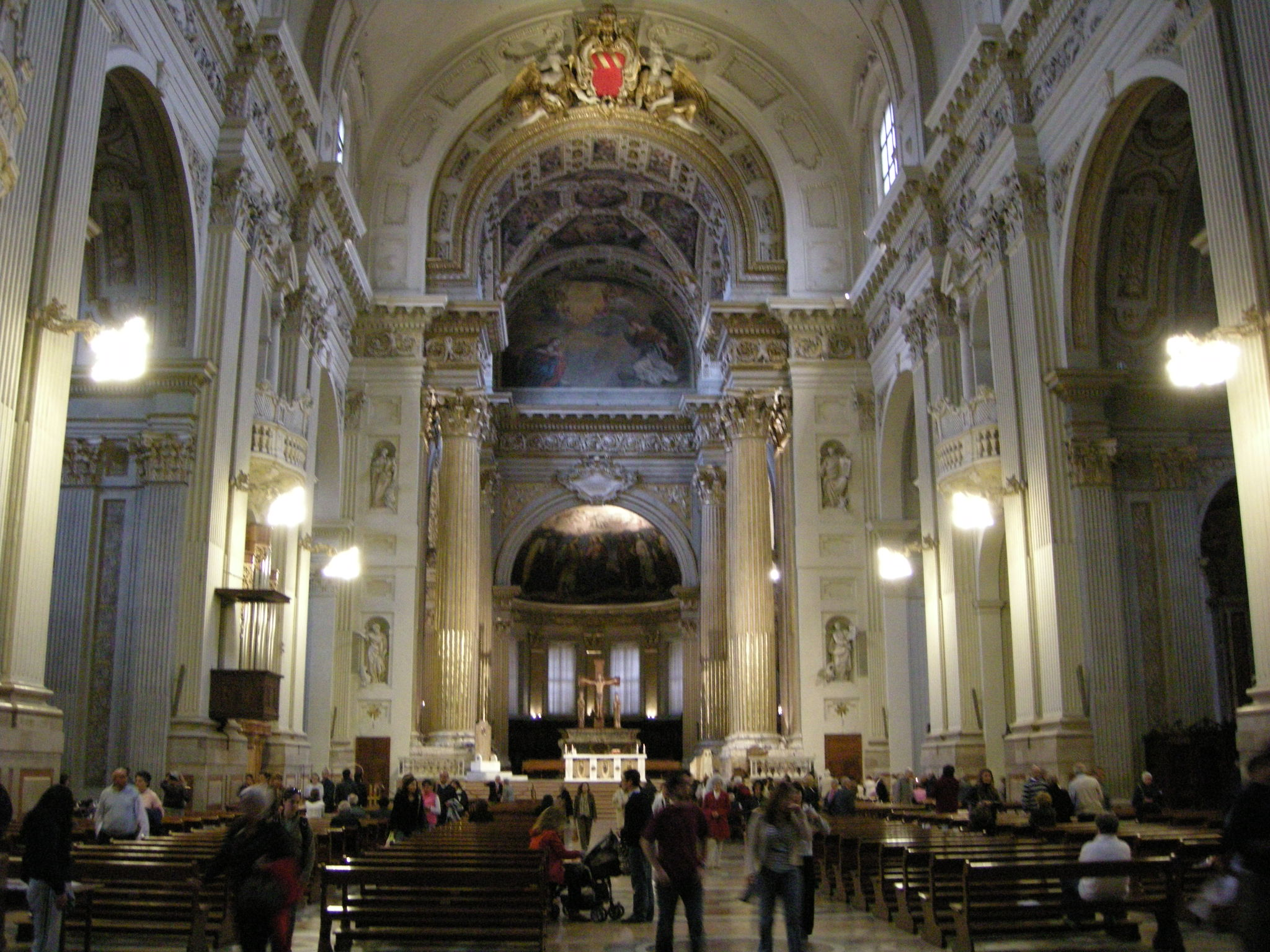
View into the apse of Bologna Cathedral showing in the cupola Trebbi's frescoes of Saint Anne in Glory

Cesare Mauro Trebbi (1847–1931), also known as Mauro Cesare Trebbi, was an Italian painter and lithographer best known for his historico-religious set pieces and especially valued for his figure painting. He worked principally on large-scale public compositions for religious buildings. His frescoes are to be found in many churches in Emilia-Romagna. He was born and died in Bologna.

== Selected works ==
- Bologna Cathedral: paintings inside the cupola of Saint Anne in Glory
- Church of Saints Simon and Jude in Rubizzano, a frazione of San Pietro in Casale, has canvases by Trebbi and by Alessandro Guardassoni
- Church of San Pietro in Castello d'Argile: figures inside the cupola, in collaboration with the painter Antonio Mosca and the decorator Francesco Fabbri
- Church of Santa Maria del Carmine, Galliera: the decorations of the nave are by Trebbi in collaboration with the church decorator Pompeo Fortini
