= San Sebastiano Madonna =

Painting by Antonio da Correggio

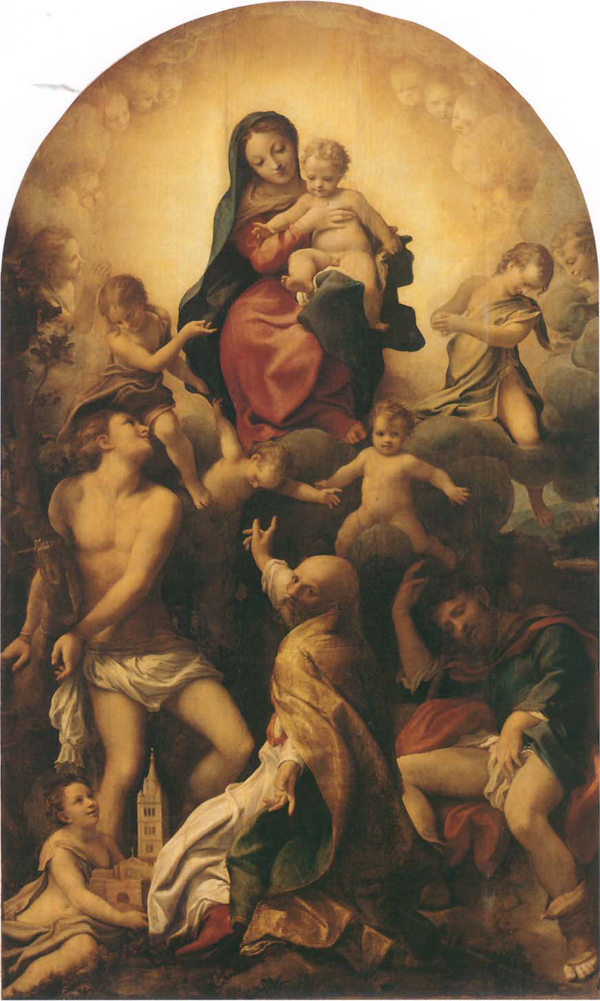
The San Sebastiano Madonna

The San Sebastiano Madonna is an oil-on-canvas painting by the Italian Renaissance master Correggio, dating to around 1524 and now in the Gemäldegalerie Alte Meister in Dresden. It measures 265 by 161 cm.

It was commissioned by the confraternity of Saint Sebastian (San Sebastiano) in Modena, probably via sodalist Francesco Grillenzoni, who Vasari recorded as "a very close friend of Correggio" and owner of The Mystic Marriage of Saint Catherine. Saint Roch's presence on the right suggests the commission was linked to a plague, probably that in Modena in 1523, leading to a painting date in 1524. Vasari briefly mentions it in its original site. In the 17th century Francesco I d'Este took it for his own gallery, where it was admired by Francesco Scannelli. Like most of the d'Este collection it was bought in August 1746 by Augustus III of Saxony, who took it to Dresden.

It became famous early on, as shown by copies in print by Carlo Bertelli and in paint by Federico Zuccari.
