= Alessandro Guardassoni =

Italian painter

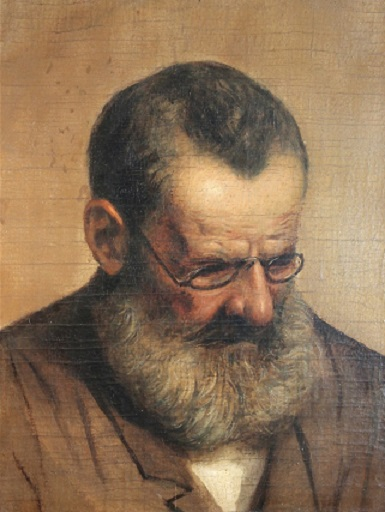
Alessandro Guardassoni self portrait

Alessandro Guardassoni (13 December 1819 in Bologna – 1 March 1888 in Bologna) was an Italian painter. He mainly painted religious themes. He trained in the Accademia Pontificia di Belle Arti of Bologna, under Clemente Alberi. He collaborated with Cesare Mauro Trebbi. He painted some of the frescoes in the church of San Giuliano, Bologna and Sant'Andrea Apostolo di Quarto Superiore. He was named to a professorship of the Accademia Felsinea.

== Sources ==
- Information from entry in Italian Wikipedia
- Discorsi letti nella grand' aula della Pontificia accademia di belle arti in Bologna, (1841).
- Media related to Alessandro Guardassoni at Wikimedia Commons
