= History of Terni =

History of the municipality of Terni, Italy

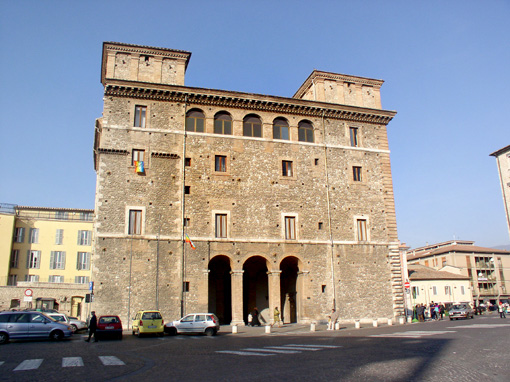
Palazzo Spada

The city of Terni is now the main population center of the basin of the same name and one of the most important and populous cities in Central Italy and the Apennine area. It is developed on a plain to the right of the Nera River, in an area at the confluence of the Velino and Valnerina valleys, where the valley floors intersect the important Apennine natural corridors such as the Naia valley, the middle Tiber and the Clitunno valleys, historically crossed by the main communication routes of central Italy.

The earliest archaeological finds, testifying to a stable human presence in the area, emerged from some peripheral excavations and date from the Copper and Iron Ages. After the first half of the 3rd century B.C., the Romans founded a colony in Nequinate territory, near Narni, under the name of Interamna. The colony was later included in the Augustan age in Regio VI. Interamna became the seat of a Christian diocese from the second century and, after suffering the ravages of barbarian invasions, it saw in the Middle Ages the domination of the Lombards of Spoleto at first, then freedom as a free municipality rebelling against the Papal State, with the Ghibelline party of the city always at its head, until the final annexation to the Papal State, which took place under Pope Pius IV in 1563.

Throughout the ancient age Terni was a thriving medium-sized city in the Umbrian countryside until, in the 19th century, industrial and railroad development at first, and the establishment of the province of the same name later, brought the city, in a relatively short period of time, to a radical change in its economy and social balance.

== Prehistory ==
The city, located in an alluvial plain between the Nera River and the Serra stream, saw its territory settled not before the Copper Age, to which date a hut floor and ceramic material with the typological characteristics of the Conelle-Ortucchio culture, discovered below some burials of the later necropolis of the steelworks. Even during the Middle Bronze Age human groups, bearers of the so-called Apennine Civilization inhabited this area, although the most significant archaeological evidence has been found around Lake Piediluco, not far from Terni.

=== Phase "Terni I" ===
The most significant human presence, however, is dated to the 10th century B.C., that is, the beginning of the Iron Age: in 1884, during construction work on the steel mill, a vast necropolis was found, used until the 6th century B.C., belonging to the so-called Culture of Terni. Based on the type of grave goods, it is possible to distinguish three phases: Terni I, Terni II and Terni III. (Note: While it can be questioned, the classification remains the one formulated by Hermann Müller-Karpe, Beiträge zur Chronologie der Urnenfelderzeit nördlich und südlich der Alpen, Berlin 1959. For a more recent review of the material see Valentina Leonelli, La necropoli delle Acciaierie, in Valentina Leonelli, Paolo Renzi, Claudia Andreani, Cristina Ranucci, Interamna Nahartium, Materiali per il Museo Archeologico di Terni, edited by Vincenzo Pirro, Edizioni Thyrus, Arrone (TR) 1997, pp. 17-58)

To the first phase, the earliest, belong the incineration tombs, formed by a mostly cylindrical shaft, inside which an olla and a set of fibulae and rings in female burials, bronze razors in male burials were deposited; in some tombs the cinerary urn was covered with one or two slabs of capuchin stone, and the whole shaft was filled with earth and pebbles, then bounded by a circle of stones. There are cultural similarities with the Lazio area, especially Rome-Alban Hills and Allumiere. The settlement corresponding to the necropolis of this period was probably located on Pentima Hill, along the eastern edge of the Terni basin, above the alluvial deposit between the Nera and Serra rivers, in which the necropolis was founded.

=== Phase "Terni II" ===
The second phase, datable to the 9th century BCE, is characterized by the replacement of the funerary rite of incineration with that of inhumation, although the former still appears to have been practiced in a small minority of the depositions. Inhumation burials consisted of rectangular pits filled with earth and stones above ground level, sometimes bounded on the surface by a circle of stones. At the foot of the inhumed person were placed ollae and jars, locally produced, with partially purified impasto and little decoration.

In this period, male graves are dominated by the presence of weapons, generally made of bronze, including short swords with blade and hilt fused together, spearheads, some made of iron, placed on the sides of the head, triangular in shape. There are also numerous razors, usually half-moon shaped, with geometric engravings. Female burials are characterized by the presence of Bronze Age armillae, earrings, necklaces and spirals ornamented with amber, glass paste or bone. There are numerous fibulae of various shapes. At the time of discovery they were found to have been laid almost everywhere: from the simplest position at breast height to a long series reaching from the sternum to the feet along the left flank.

Cultural evidence from this phase reconnects the Terni necropolis to the Umbrian, Sabine, and Picenian areas, but with contributions from the Lazio phase of Rome-Alban Hills II, especially in pottery. The groups that founded the necropolis seem to be organized according to a possibly warrior hierarchy, capable of producing food surpluses from agricultural and breeding activities and in a minority of cases able to accumulate wealth, exchanging artifacts even over long distances, from Fratta Polesine, in the midst of the Veneto culture to northern and southern Etruria.

=== Phase "Terni III" ===
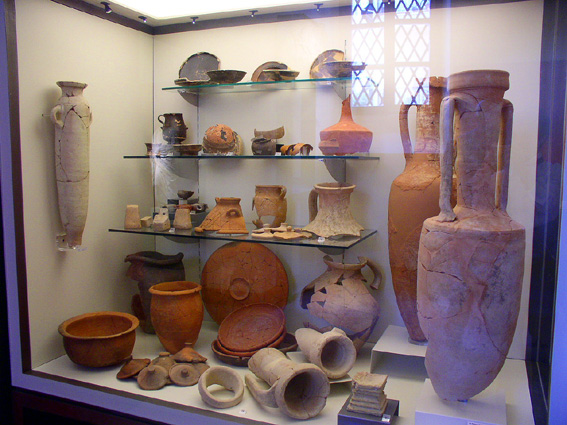
Some artifacts from the Archaeological Museum

To the third phase, datable between the 8th and 6th centuries B.C., belong the tombs of S. Pietro in Campo, just west of the Steelworks necropolis. The burials are all inhumation burials, and are particularly rich: the men's with iron weapons, including leaf spears, javelins, swords and daggers; the women's with lebetes, basins, drawing cups, amphorae, as well as fibulae. The ceramic material, which is much finer and more finely worked than that of the previous phase, is usually represented by a large vase, and one or more small vessels and other objects, such as cups and ollae, all laid in a single tomb. The metal and ceramic objects are both of foreign origin, especially Phoenician, Etruscan, Faliscan, and Picenian, as well as local, but always with typically orientalizing references in those dated to the seventh and sixth centuries BCE.

The social group that used this necropolis seems marked by a greater differentiation of its members, some of whom dominated by wealth and military ability to control the territory; agro-food production went far beyond a simple subsistence economy, with the accumulation of even prestigious derricks; finally, the cultural environment was more inclined to accept new patterns. The settlement no longer seems to be located on the Pentima hill but on the small rise, corresponding to the present Clai square, where the Roman city and the Terni of later centuries would rise, as the result of an urbanization effort that saw the depopulation of some of the heights surrounding the Terni basin and the concentration of the population around a cultic area, near a ford of the Nera, at the confluence with the Serra; this geographical feature would justify the Latin toponym.

The Eugubine Tables mention in the 3rd century B.C. the presence in the area of the people of the Naharti (Naharkum..Numen), either an Umbrian population or, if different from the Umbrians, a group belonging to an older Indo-European substratum. It is likely that the Naharti lived precisely along the course of the Nera River, whose hydronymic root Nahar- is in common with the appellation Naharkum. The Naharti bordered with other peoples such as the Picenes and Etruscans and were considered enemies of the Umbrian arch of Gubbio, on a par with the Etruscans and Jabuscians. Overall they were a mixed-strain population, given the diverse amount of burials found in Terni. The Umbrian identity of the Naharti remained strong and conservative even after annexation to Rome, they managed to gain influence and become a Roman province. Naharki warriors composed an essential element of Umbro-Roman military garrisons. They founded the city in 672 B.C., as shown by a Tiberian-era Latin inscription. The name Interamna Nahars suggested that the Nera and Serra rivers and their tributaries surrounded the city, forming a natural defense. In fact: Inter (between) Amne (streams, rivers) and Nahars (Naharti-ki, inhabitants of the Nera River, in Latin Nar or Nahar).

Some of the summits surrounding the Terni plain continued to be inhabited, such as the southern foothills of the Martani Mountains, scattered with small settlements, located between 700 and 1,000 meters above sea level, not all of them for habitation purposes. The most important of these is the fortified site of S. Erasmo di Cesi, datable to at least the fifth century B.C., provided with two small necropolises dating from the ninth to sixth centuries B.C., which was built a little lower than the cultic complex of Torre Maggiore, dating from the sixth century B.C, but probably frequented from much earlier, in which a number of votive offerings have been found, mostly of a warrior nature; this indicates the military nature of the preeminent groups located on these heights. The unproven report that above Rocca San Zenone was the Umbrian oppidum of Vindena probably refers to the remembrance of these highland settlements.

== The Roman conquest ==
The classical sources do not mention when Terni became part of Roman administrative structures. Shortly before the outbreak of the Third Samnite War Rome embarked on a campaign of war against the Nequinati, the inhabitants of what is now Narni, where, after the taking of Nequino, they established a Latin colony, giving it the name Narnia. In 290 B.C., or shortly thereafter, M. Curius Dentatus promoted both the construction of the Via Curia, connecting Terni to Rieti, (Note: Dionysius of Halicarnassus, Ρωμαιχή Ἁρχαιολόγια, I, 14.4. In this passage Dionysius reports the existence, according to Varro, of the road that joined Reate to the pagus of Septem Acquae, which modern criticism has identified as a settlement that arose near some bodies of water, a remnant of the ancient Lacus Velinus, behind the Marmore ridge. It is not certain, therefore, that the Via Curia reached, originally, precisely at Interamna.) and, in 271 B.C, the cutting of the Marmore ridge, to facilitate the outflow of the waters of the Velino into the Nera; it is therefore probable that, after the first half of the third century B.C., the inhabited nucleus, which arose at the confluence of the Serra in the Nera, had been Romanized into a Latin colony with the name of Interamna. It is not known whether the foundation of the colony took place at the same time as that of Narnia, but, similar to other colonial foundations, it is presumable that this is what happened. (Note: Alternatively, one might think of the initial founding of either a conciliabulum or a praefectura and subsequent transformation into a Latin colony) Incidentally, the walls that surrounded the perimeter of the Roman settlement seem to date back to this era.

During the Second Punic War, in 214 BC, Interamna, together with eleven other Latin colonies, was not in a position to provide its contingent of armed men to form the two urban legions that the consuls of that year, Quintus Fabius Maximus Verrucosus and Marcus Claudius Marcellus, intended to enlist; this action, judged by the Senate of Rome as treason, was severely punished a few years later by the enactment of a special law, which in the jurisdiction of the Latin colonies was called ius XII coloniarum. To this period date the walls that surrounded the perimeter of the Roman settlement.

The refusal to hand over the armies was judged by the Roman Senate to be an act of treason, so that, after other episodes of noncompliance occurred for another six years, in 208 B.C. punishment was triggered, which entered Roman jurisdiction under the name of jus XII coloniarum: the twelve colonies, in addition to providing a fixed number of armed men to be sent out of Italy, were forced to draw up annual census lists and deliver them to the Roman magistrates in charge, so that enlistment was done directly by them, subject to a tax of one per thousand on the declared assets.

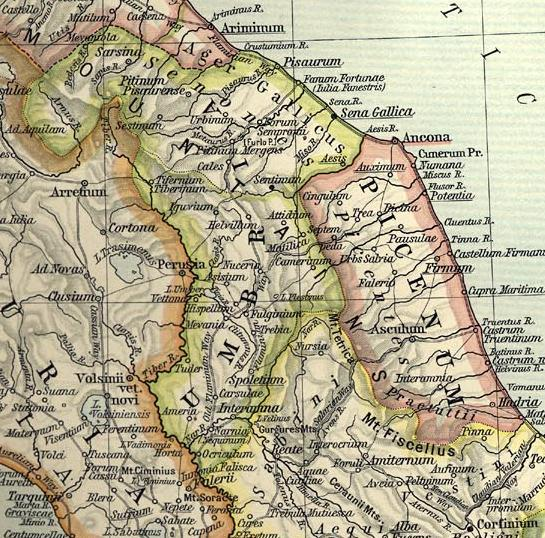
Map of regio VI.

At the end of the second century B.C. are datable some works of rearrangement of the eastern branch of the Via Flaminia, which connected -and connects- Narni to Spoleto, to reconnect to the original route of the consular at the height of Forum Flaminii, just north of Foligno. It is not known when this road branch was built, but it is clear that with it a stronger presence of Rome was achieved between the very loyal Otricoli and the equally loyal Spoleto, especially after the defection of the Interamnates during the Second Punic War. As for Interamna, the Flaminia, which entered the city from the southwest, formed the cardo, while the hypothetical route of the Via Curia, or the road that connected with it, within the walls formed the decumanus.

After the social war Interamna became municipium, it is not known whether with the characteristics of full citizenship or as civitas sine suffragio. (Note: This issue is highly controversial. For example, in Michelle Humbert, Municipium et civitas sine suffragio. L'organisation de la conquete jusqu'à la guerre sociale, Collection de l'École française de Rome, no. 36, Paris-Rome 1978, pp. 224-226, it is argued that the rank of civitas sine suffragio was achieved as early as the third century BCE.) Following the defeat of M. Antony in the war of Perusia against C. G. Caesar Octavian, Interamna was saved from the confiscation of private property, although it had to suffer viritane allocations in favor of military members of Octavian's army.

== The Roman Empire ==
With the administrative arrangement of Italy, Interamna was enrolled in the tribe Clustumina and included in the Regio VI Umbria. The period between the end of the first century B.C. and the first half of the first century A.D. marks the final structuring of Roman Terni. In this period the temples, theater, two baths and amphitheater are built. The wide availability of water and the fertility of the soil allowed a flourishing development of agriculture and communication routes of trade; the hills around the settlement became populated with rustic villas. The canonical municipal magistracies such as the Quattuorviri jure dicundo, the two aediles curules, the quaestores a decurionibus, the decuriones and the imperial cultists, the seviri augustales, are attested; religious figures included the pontifex and praetor sacrorum. (Note: All of this information can be deduced from the body of inscriptions in CIL, Volume XI and other unedited inscriptions; for a critical evaluation, Claudia Andreani, Il municipio romano, in Valentina Leonelli, Paolo Renzi, Claudia Andreani, Cristina Ranucci, op. cit., pp. 139-168)

In 69 Interamna was the site of a skirmish between four hundred horsemen of Vitellius' last cohorts, attested at Narni, and the legions of T. Flavius Vespasian, encamped at Carsulae. This would have been the only act of war in the final surrender between the two contenders, which occurred due to treachery on the part of Vitellius' armies.

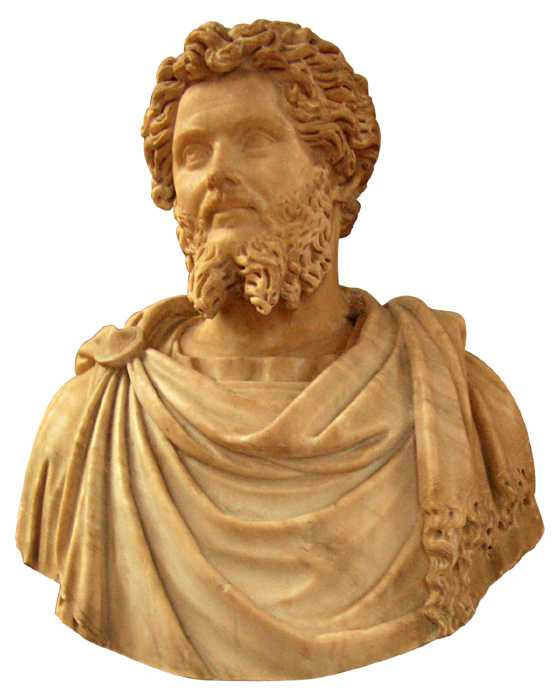
Lucius Septimius Severus

Per eos cognitum est Interamnam proximis campis praesidio quadringentorum equitum teneri. Missus extemplo Varus cum expedita manu paucos repugnantium interfecit, plures abiectis armis veniam petivere.
Through them it was learned that Interamna, located in the nearby countryside, was held by four hundred horsemen. Varus, who was immediately dispatched with lightly armed soldiers, killed those few who resisted, while most, having thrown down their weapons, demanded to be spared.

— Publius Cornelius Tacitus, Historiae, Liber III, LXI

It dates back to the beginning of the third century A.D. that the Tabula Peutingeriana testified that the reference route of the Via Flaminia was no longer the western one, from Narnia to Mevania, but the eastern one passing through Terni, contrary to the itinerarium Gaditanum of two centuries earlier, which indicates the former as the preferred route. In 193 L. Septimius Severus, as emperor, appointed by the legions of Illyria, met the senatorial delegation at Interamna who came to pay homage to him for his office and to ask his pardon.

In 253, near Interamna, Emperor V. Trebonianus Gallus and his son G. Vibius Volusianus, who were preparing to fight against the legions of the usurper M. Aemilius Aemilianus, who had been acclaimed Emperor by the troops of Moesia, found death at the hands of his own soldiers.

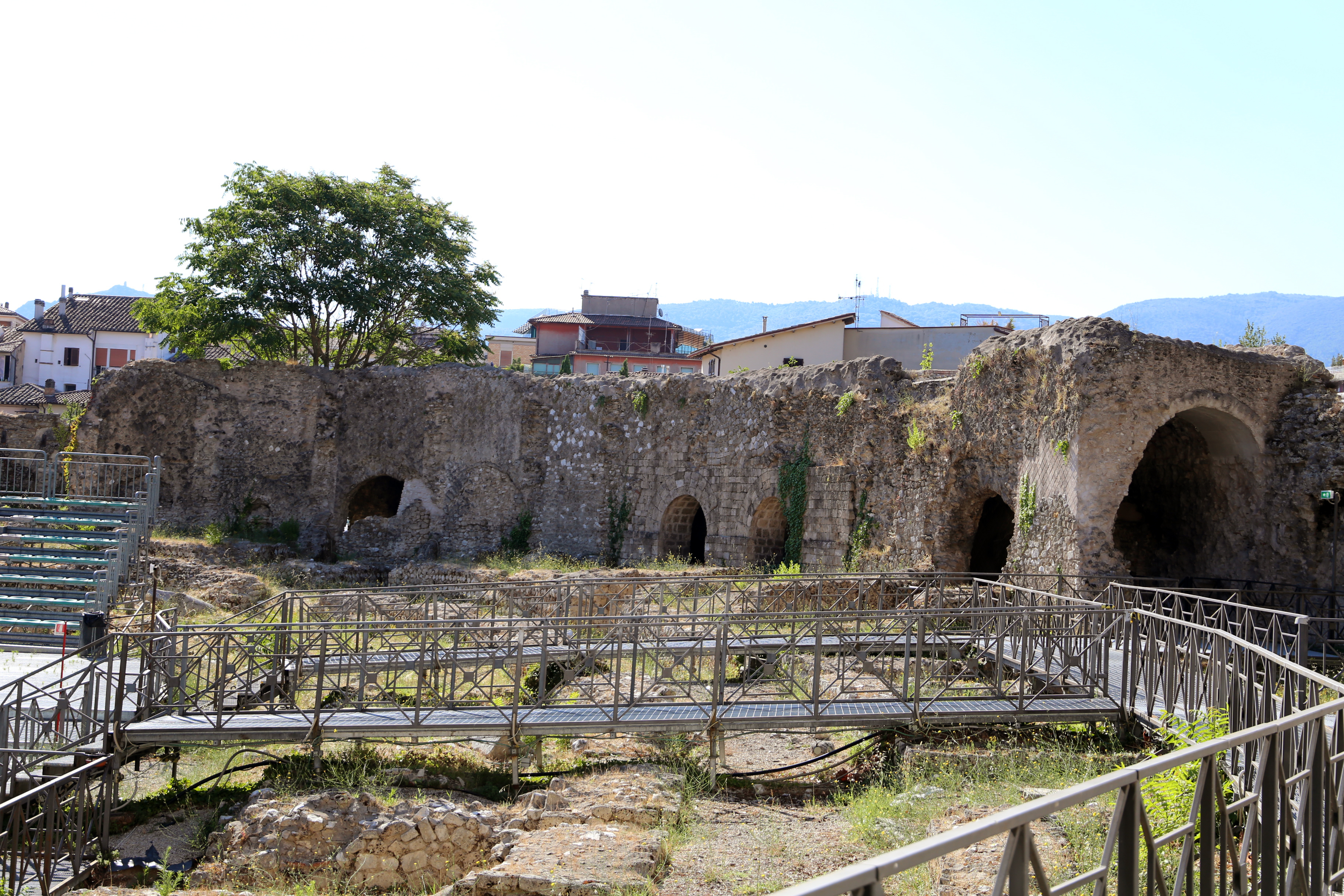
Remains of the Roman amphitheater

In 306 Galenus, Caesar of Illyria, who had descended to Italy with his legions to force Maxentius to relinquish the title of Emperor, conferred on him only by the Praetorians, and jurisdiction over Italy and Africa, set up his camps near Interamna and from there attempted to persuade Maxentius before attacking Rome; the treachery of many of his soldiers, however, induced him to return to Illyria.

It dates from the beginning of the third century the testimony of the Tabula Peutingeriana that the reference route of the Via Flaminia is no longer the western one, from Narnia to Mevania, but the eastern one, passing through Terni, contrary to the Itinerarium Gaditanum, of two centuries earlier, which indicates the former as the preferred route. (Note: This finding seems to support the passage of Publius Cornelius Tacitus, Historiae, II, 64, in which it is reported that Vitellius, in an effort to have Dolabella assassinated at Terni, invited him to take the branch of the Flaminia that passes through Interamna, because the western one was too beaten.) It is probable that between the first and third centuries a branch of the Via Flaminia, called the Via Interamnana, was built on a much older route, linking Interamna to Eretum, today's Monterotondo, and allowing people to reach Rome via the Via Salaria or Via Nomentana, without passing through the Via Flaminia. (Note: On the extra-urban Roman road system, see Paul Fontaine, Citès et enceintes de l'Ombrie antique, Institut Historique Belge de Rome, Bruxelles-Rome 1990, pp. 111-114)

With the reform of the Empire, desired by Diocletian, Interamna was included in the province of Tuscia et Umbria.

The spread of Christianity is attested by the cemetery area, datable to the fourth century, built on a pagan necropolis at the top of a hill just south of the city, along the Via Interamnana. The bishops who have been attested with certainty are Praetextatus in 465 and Felix between 501 and 502. The main place of worship was probably built within the city walls, close to the Faustian amphitheater, on the site where the cathedral now stands and initially dedicated to St. Mary of the Assumption and St. Anastasius.

== The Early Middle Ages ==
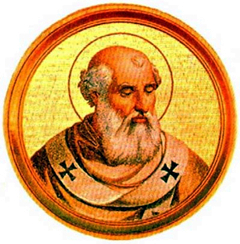
Pope Zachary.

Given its central location and its communication routes, Interamna saw continuous movements of armies through it from north to south and vice versa, throughout the late Empire and during the barbarian invasions, although, in this regard, precise documentation is lacking.

In 537, during the Gothic War, Vitiges, having given up the siege of Narni, held by the Byzantines of Bessa, led his army to Rome, through Sabina, probably traveling along the Via Interamnana. Whether Terni remained in the hands of Belisarius is unknown; assuming it was, Totila, in 544, recaptured it, together with the Byzantine stronghold of Spoleto, proceeding to systematically regain dominion over the Via Flaminia, an obligatory route for Byzantine aid to Rome, via Ravenna or the Julian Alps. A similar route was taken in 551 by Narses, who retook Tuscia between Perugia, Spoleto and Narni, including Terni. (Note: For the movements of the Gothic and Byzantine armies in present-day southern Umbria see Procopius of Caesarea, Ὑπὲρ τὼν πολεμὼν, V, 16; VI, 11; VII, 12; VIII, 23)

=== The Lombard period ===
The most significant conquest was the Lombard one, which took place at the hands of the Dukes of Spoleto at the end of the 6th century and was accomplished as early as the time of Authari. Terni became a frontier city, being located a short distance from Byzantine Narni, which was placed to guard the Via Flaminia. Although the exact boundary between the two enemy areas is very difficult to identify, it is believed that it lay between the consular Flaminia, in its earliest route, in the hands of the Byzantines, and the Via Interamnana, in the hands of the Lombards, who used it for the occupation of western Sabina, as far as Farfa. For these reasons, the existence of a gastaldate since the first half of the 7th century could be justifiable.

Due to its position as a frontier city, Terni saw in 742 the solemn meeting of Liutprand with Pope Zachary, following which the Lombard king made an act of renunciation of the possession of the castles occupied in that year, including Narni, and defined a new territorial arrangement of his kingdom in central Italy. (Note: On the historical importance of the content of the meeting, one can see an essay such as Oreste Bertolini's Il problema delle origini del potere temporale dei papi nei suoi presupposti teoretici iniziali: il concetto di 'restitutio' nelle prime cessioni territoriali alla chiesa di Roma in Scritti scelti di storia medievale, vol II, 'Il Telegrafo', Livorno 1968, pp. 487-550)

Veniens itaque ad civitatem Interamnis, ubi tunc dictus rex cum suis exercitibus erat, cum rex audiret eius adventum, omnes duces exercituum suorum maiores usque ad octo miliaria misit obviam illi. Sed et ipse rex usque ad medium miliare processit obvia Zachariae summo pontifice, illumque cum gaudio magno et summa reverentia intra civitatem suscepit. Cumque in ecclesia beati valentini ambo consedissent.....huius autem sanctis persuasionibus compunctus rex langobardus, ad mandatum pontificis civitates, quas Romanis abstulerat, restituit.
While, thus, he was coming [Pope Zachary] to the city of Interamna, where the king had already stationed himself with his whole army, the king, who had learned of his arrival, sent all his highest-ranking commanders as far as the eighth mile to welcome him. But the king himself proceeded to meet the high pontiff Zachary and accompanied him inside the city with great joy and utmost respect. After they both sat down in the church of Blessed Valentine.....impressed by the holy persuasive words of him [Pope Zachary] the Lombard king returned to the pontiff the cities he had taken from the Romans.

— Pauli Continuationes, III, 9-18

During the first phase of Lombard rule the Terni diocese was suppressed by Gregory the Great, perhaps more due to lack of believers than to population reduction, and was absorbed by that of Narni.

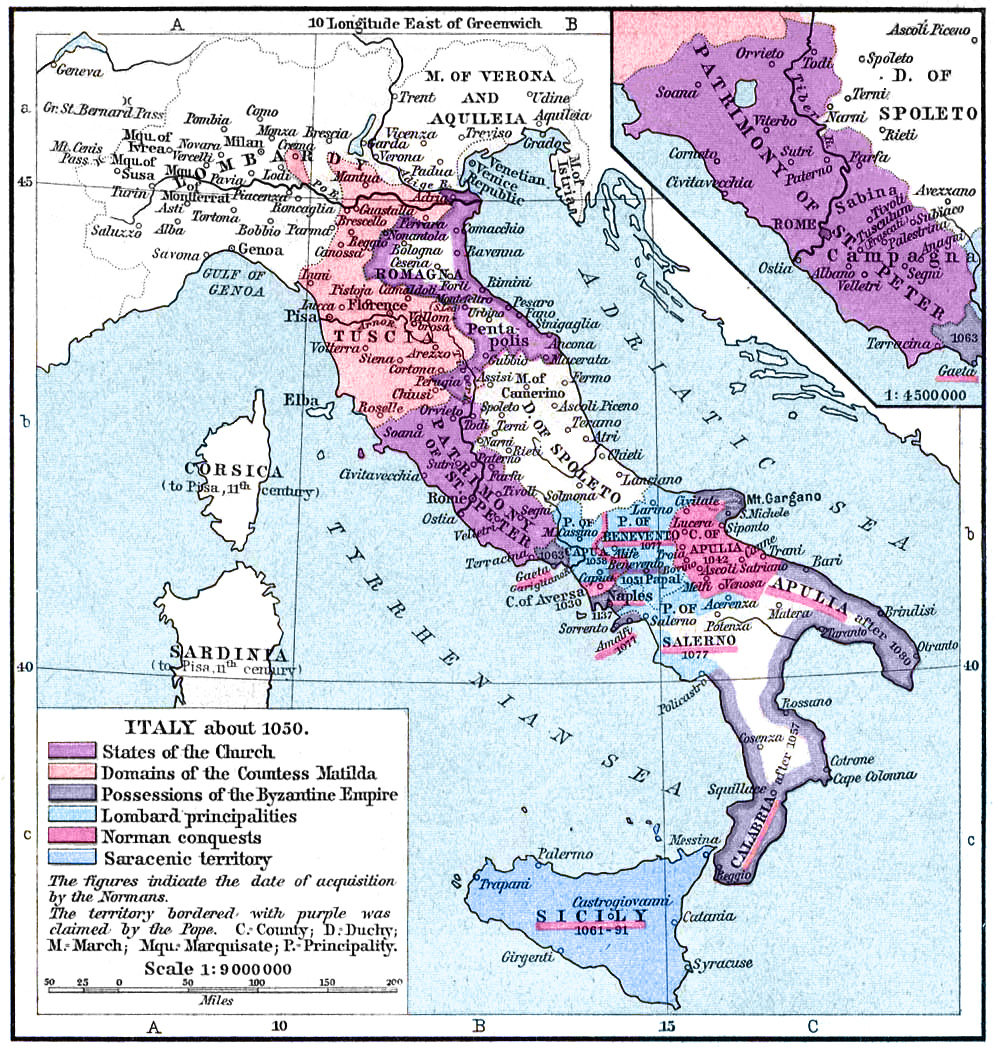
Italy in 1050.

The transition to the Franks did not radically change the situation, as Terni continued to depend on the Duchy of Spoleto. The diocese at the end of the 8th century was annexed to that of Spoleto, thus re-establishing, though in favor of the Kingdom, an institutional anomaly. It was precisely for this reason that the Papacy and the Narnese diocese never ceased to claim sovereignty over Terni, making strong claims to the Promissio Carisiaca and subsequent diplomas affirming the Empire's willingness to return Narni to the Pope. (Note: Despite well-founded doubts of authenticity and misunderstanding about the object of restitution to the Papacy after the wars of the Lombard king Desiderius, documentation can be found in the various published Imperial Diplomas in Monumenta Germaniae Historica (vedi))

The issue seemed to clear up in February 962 when Otto I of Saxony within a well-known privilegium of his, among numerous provisions, granted the Pope, John XIII, of the Crescenzi Family, true feudal lords of Narni, possession of Teramne with all its appurtenances. This, however, was not followed up, perhaps because of the resistance of the dukes and bishops of Spoleto.

== The Late Middle Ages ==
Terni was one of the first cities to adopt the consular and arengo system of the people. In 1159, at the beginning of the conflict between Frederick Barbarossa and Alexander III, the city's development had to come to a halt due to the feudal investiture in favor of the brothers of Cardinal Ottaviano Monticelli (of noble lineage, his household being that of the Cesi family of Narni), imposed by the emperor, who elevated the cardinal to the role of antipope. To further the antipope's kinship, Frederick I endowed the two brothers of Cardinal Octavian with the feudality of Terni. The people of Terni managed, with the help of the legitimate pope, to "shake them off." A few years later, although the city managed to free itself and return to normality, its early years as a medieval municipality were shaken by a second shock in March or April 1174, when Terni - accused of not paying the taxes due - was destroyed by the army of the imperial legate Archbishop Christian of Mainz, Frederick Barbarossa's most ruthless collaborator in subduing pro-papal cities. (Note: Die Chronic des Popstes Burchard von Ursberg in Monumenta Germaniae Historica, Scriptores rerum germanicarum in usum scholarum separatim editi, p. 52. However, an imperial document seems to justify the Germans' action as a reaction to the fact that the people of Terni were not paying taxes as due to the Narni tax collectors (Johan Friederich Bohmer, Regesta Imperii IV. Lothar III und åltere Staufer 1125-1197. 2 Abt.: Die Regesten des Kaiserreiches unter Friederich I 1152(1122)-1190. Lief 1168-1180, Wien 2001, IV, 2,3, n.2070) Only the decisive annexation of the entire Duchy of Spoleto by Pope Innocent III in 1198 succeeded in making Terni a piece of the Patrimony of St. Peter in Tuscia. In 1218, Honorius III reconstituted the Cathedral Chapter in the church of St. Mary of the Assumption, but endowed it with very little territorial jurisdiction, exposed to the claims, on the one hand of Narni, on the other of Spoleto, which was supported by the Roman families, especially the Crescenzi, who at that time set upon Narni for their incursions or claims in Umbria, especially in the basin that had always been Terni's domain.

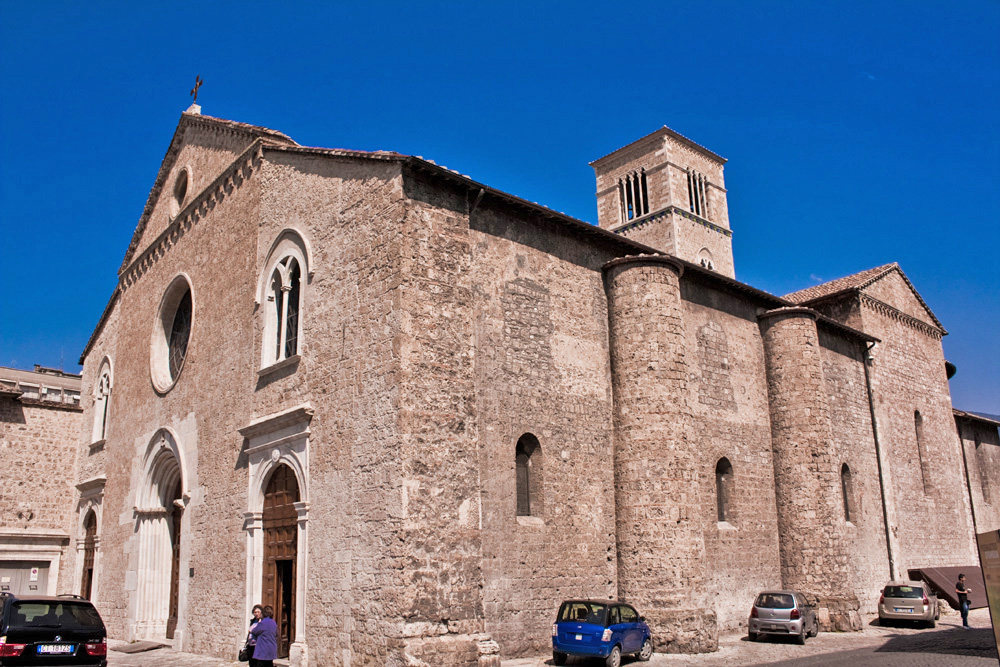
Church of St. Francis (Terni, second half of the 13th century)

When Terni became part of the temporal power of the Church it was already a municipality, with the magistracy of two consuls and a parliament. At the time the diocese was returned to it, Terni also had a podestà and a Capitano del Popolo. In 1218, Honorius III reconstituted the Chapter of the Cathedral in the church of Santa Maria Assunta, but endowed it with very little territorial jurisdiction, exposed to the claims of Spoleto, which was supported by the capricious Roman families, especially the Crescenzi, who at that time set upon Narni as a terrace and support for their incursions or alleged claims in Umbria, most fiercely in the fertile basin. The thirteenth century, the era of the institutional definition of the municipality, a period dominated by struggles over the determination of the territory's boundaries and the assertion of the city over the earldom, had been characterized by public initiative that took the form of the opening of the great construction sites of the municipal palaces and that of the episcopal and cathedral complexes, the construction of the new city gates, and the contribution to the establishment of the mendicant order. With Francis of Assisi's first sermon in Vulgar Latin in 1218, a period of intense religious and social activity began for Terni. In those years, the territory saw the birth first of some Franciscan hermitages and temporary settlements (the Eremo Arnulphorum or of Cesi, the cave of S. Urbano di Vasciano) and Augustinian (S. Bartholomew of Rusciano near Rocca San Zenone, the latter was a castle or fortified village in the countryside of Terni, which still exists, placed in defense of the city), then of churches and real convents especially in urban areas, as also happened in the neighboring fiefs (or autonomous small fortified villages) of Stroncone, Piediluco, Sangemini and Acquasparta for the Minorites, in the nearby rival city of Narni for Friars Minor, Augustinians and Dominicans.

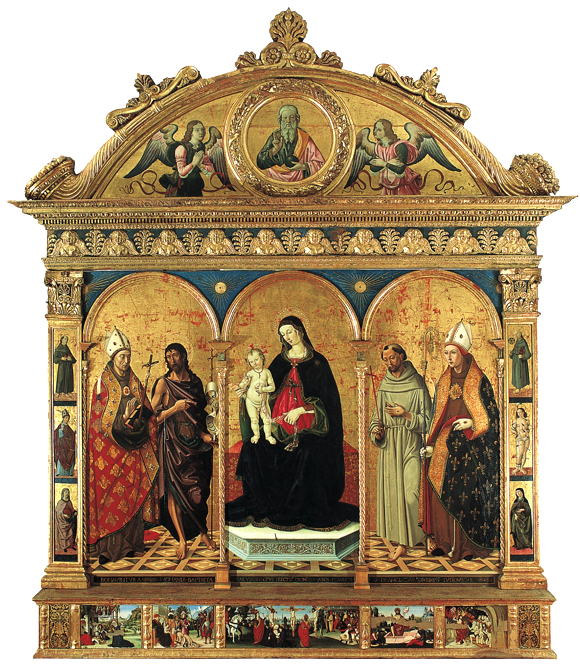
Franciscan altarpiece (Piermatteo d'Amelia, Terni, Church of San Francesco, Sept. 29, 1483)

In June 1241, the nobility of Germanic origin of Terni, with all its citizens, spontaneously submitted to Frederick II, who singled it out as the basis of his presence in Central Italy during the conflict that opposed him, in 1244, to Pope Innocent IV. The emperor stayed in the vicinity of Terni between the summer of 1244 and March 1245; he waited in vain for Innocent IV, who had in the meantime fled, first to Genoa, then to Lyon, but he conducted with Cardinal Ottone di Porto, halted in Narni, who remained faithful to the pope, negotiations on the arrangement of mutual spheres of influence in Lombardy. Also in Terni he received Albert, Patriarch of the Antiochian church, who attempted mediation between Frederick and Cardinal Deacon Ranieri, of S. Maria in Cosmedin, who was leading, especially in Tuscia, an incessant guerrilla warfare against the Emperor's Arab troops.

He returned to Terni in 1247 and apparently convened in the city the diet that would designate his son Henry to succeed him. However, with the death of the sovereign Terni reverted to a kind of papal semi-subjugation, although it continued not without rebellion and warfare to fight against the political and jurisdictional centralization of Rome, becoming a papal city very late, in 1564, later than Perugia.

In 1294 the municipality endowed itself with a new office, the 'quattro di credenza' or defenders of the People, and in 1307 of the Priors. The establishment of these two magistracies were prompted by the growing influence that members of the arts and trades, such as, for example, wool workers, blacksmiths, dyers, and merchants, had acquired within a community dominated by landowners and milites.

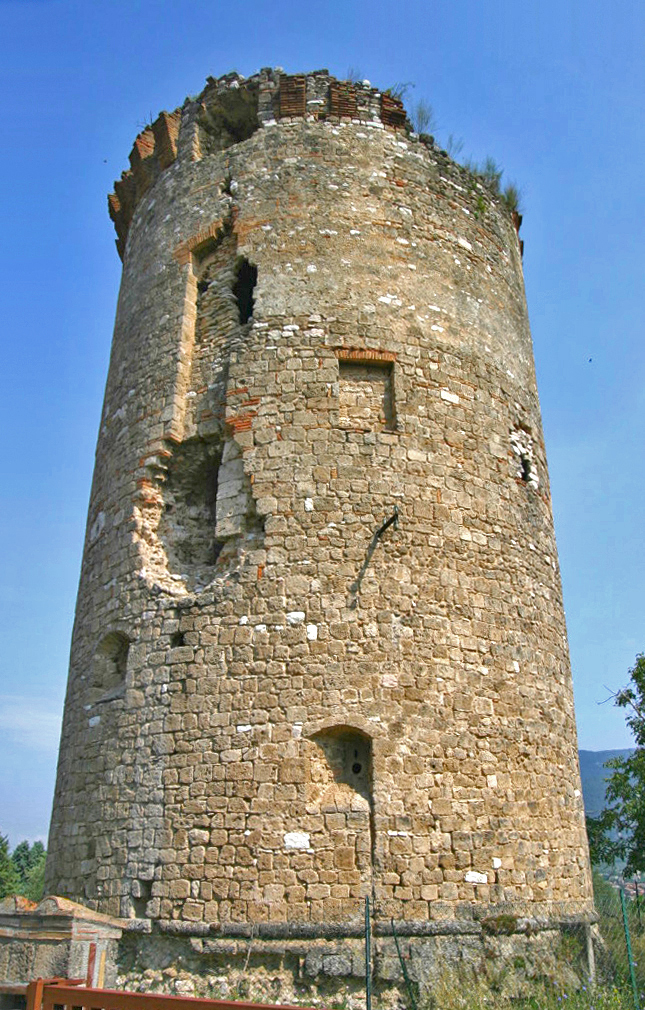
Fortress of Colleluna (14th-15th century)

During the Avignon Papacy it continued its resistance to papal power and, squeezed between two allied municipalities such as Spoleto and Narni, was forced to ally with Todi, which appointed between 1338 and 1354 seven out of ten Podestas. In 1340 the battle near the hill known as Colleluna, (Note: So called by the people of Terni because of its moon-slice shape. On the top of said locus in the late 1300s and early 1400s rose the city's most powerful defensive fortress: the Colleluna Tower.) saw Terni's army clash with its ally Amelia against the papal army to defend its economic independence. In 1354 the city submitted itself to the papal legate, Cardinal Egidio Albornoz, upon payment of five hundred florins annually for ten years, a very mild condition compared to those reserved for other municipalities of the Patrimony.

At the beginning of the 15th century, it fell under the seigniory of Andrea Tomacelli, one of the brothers of Pope Boniface IX, who, as podestà of Terni, vainly attempted to make it a stronghold of resistance against the expansionist aims of the Visconti. Between 1408 and 1415 it hosted the allied troops of Ladislaus I of Naples, who supported it in its operations against rival Spoleto. In 1417 it was subject to the lordship of Braccio da Montone, but in 1421 mercenaries in the pay of Pope Martin V brought it back under papal power. The occupation in 1434 by Francesco Sforza's troops was only a sporadic episode in the context of the war for supremacy between Florence and Milan.

Terni then had between six and seven thousand inhabitants and was a very developed and wealthy city, prosperous because due to the capitalism that was springing up on the back of flourishing trade and a growing manufacturing activity it had reached splendors that were in no way inferior to other cities. All this was favored by the presence alongside the Nera and Serra, of a series of minor waterways, the so-called forme, which activated: mills (a large number of about five hundred active), branch mills and paper mills (and which all the more justified the name of Interamna). Much of the activity of the city government was reserved for matters of a hydrological nature (Marmore, rivers and city canals). At the same time the city was enriched by an increasingly affluent and highly industrious merchant bourgeoisie that equaled in pomp and wealth the nobles. A very important aspect related to building in Terni between the late Middle Ages and the early modern age is the activity of workers coming from Lombardy: the long series of contracts stipulated with masters of Como or of Mediolanum, who, in addition to the rare public contracts, worked on private commissions, testifies to a practice established during the 15th century and still widespread in the 16th century.

At the head of the Terni municipal apparatus stood six priors (in monthly office), with broad political and administrative powers. The legislative and advisory bodies were: the Council of Credenza (or of Cerna), composed, in addition to the Priors, of the Twenty-four of the people (as many per borough, or district, which were six: Fabri, Castello, Rigoni, Aultrini, Disotto, Amingoni), each of whom carrying a flag were called Banderari (hence the origin of the name of this social class); and twenty-four Boni viri.

Between 1444 and 1448, first Eugenius IV, then Nicholas V modified the municipal statutes and attempted to introduce in Terni, as in other parts of the Patrimony, the Governorship, thus trying to give a centralizing imprint to the papal administration. However, such subservience did not come about. (Note: On the historical figure of papal governors in this period see Niccolò Del Re, Monsignor Governatore di Roma, Roma, Istituto di Studi Romani, 1972, pp. 11 e sgg. e Lodovico Silvestri, op. cit., p. 109) In 1446 some clarifications about the powers and duties of the city priors were deliberated, and directives for the preservation of documents were issued, including the "brief" of Pope Benedict III.

Serious riots broke out in Terni in July 1477, due to the insipience of the papal governor of Terni and Rieti, the bishop of Cervia Achille Mariscotti, resident in Rieti, and his weak vicar in Terni, the young and inexperienced Francesco Colozzi. The latter, insulted by some young men from Terni, asked for help from his superior, who showed up in the city fully armed and followed by a gang of thugs, with whom he started a series of clashes in the streets of the city, from which resulted eight dead and many wounded, on both sides; the governor was forced into a less than honorable escape, risking being lynched together with his vicar by the enraged population. At the same time the Lordship of Todi had armed clashes with Terni, which, with a provision of 3,000 florins a month, hired Captain Corrado d'Alviano (uncle of the well-known condottiere Bartolomeo d'Alviano). The strife ended in 1449, when the Chiaravalle of Todi placed their castles of Canale and Laguscello under the jurisdiction of the Municipality of Terni, obligating themselves to recognize its military dominion with the annual offering of a pallium worth eight gold ducats.

=== Andrea di Gioannuccio Castelli ===
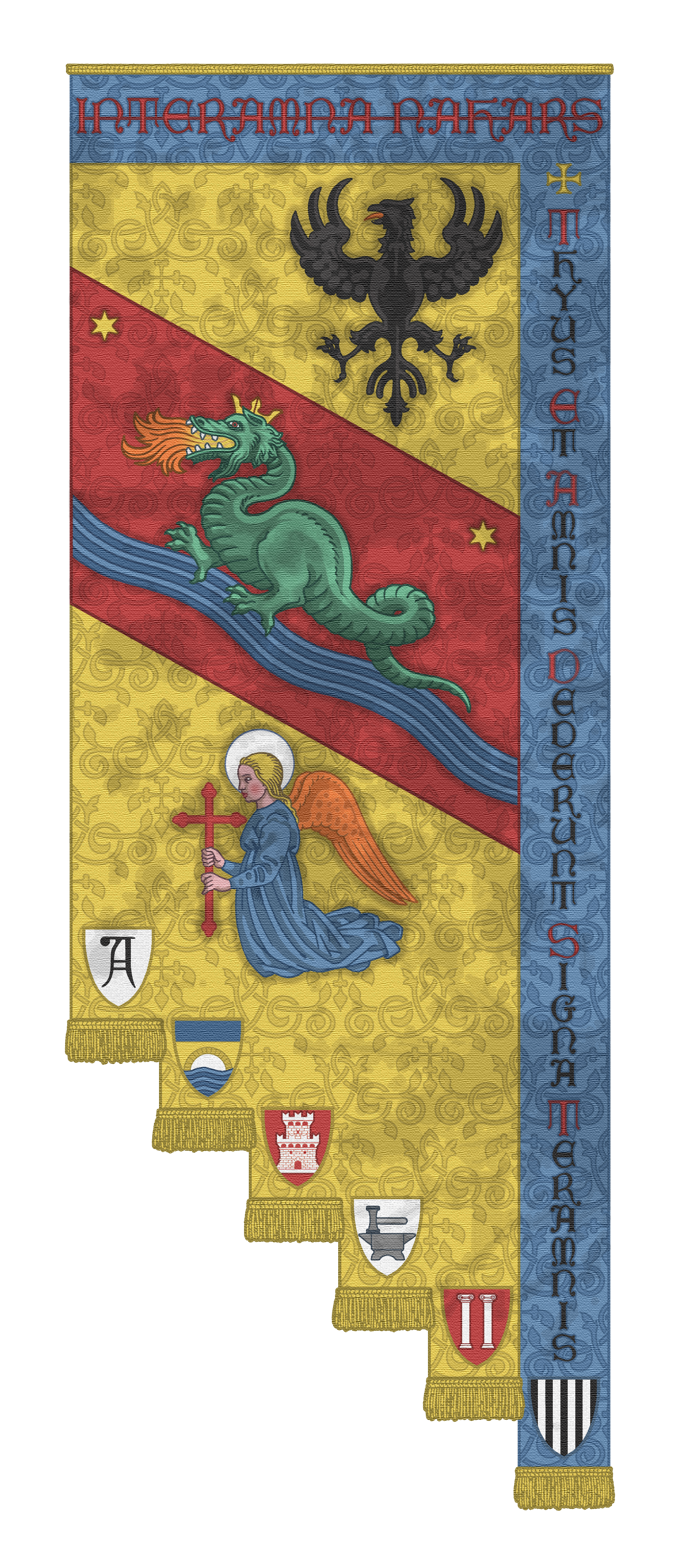
Reproduction of the banner of municipal Terni in the late 1300s, early 1400s

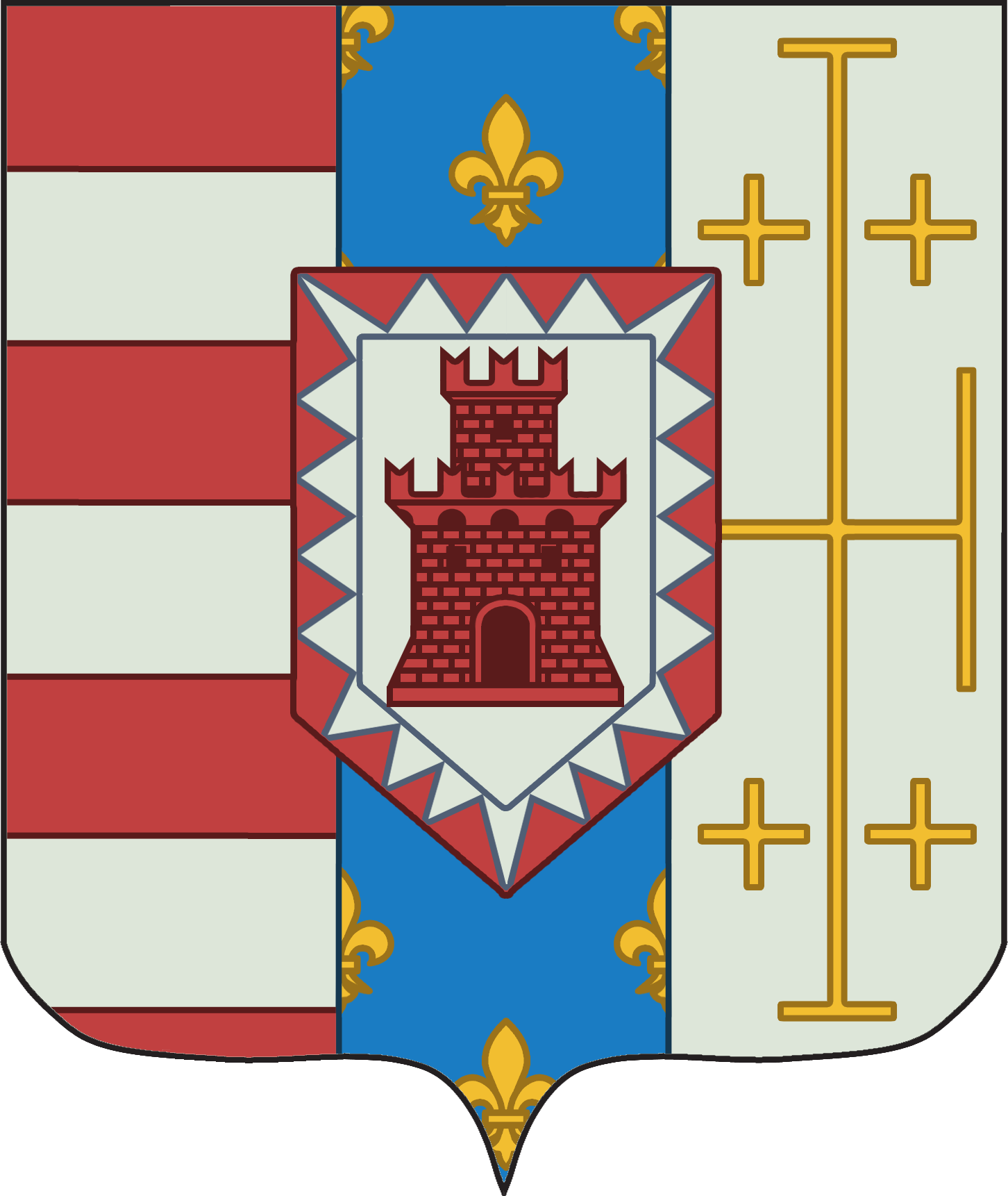
Coat of arms of Andrea di Gioannuccio Castelli

In the late 1300s and early 1400s, Andrea di Joannuccio (or Gioannuccio), leader and lord of the Ghibellines of Terni and a prominent member of the Castelli, gained power and prestige in the city. He was a high-profile figure throughout central Italy, following his podestà positions held in Fermo and Siena, where he was honored with the title of Magnificus Miles de Interamna. By Pope Boniface IX he was appointed "Magnifico et potenti viro Andrea Jannutij de Castellis," podestà of Perugia. Having finished his post in this city, where among other things he was offered an extension in the podestà office, but which he declined, he returned to Terni, to look after the rich patrimony and numerous family possessions. Andrea also placed himself at the center of several episodes of Terni political life, such as the election of the podestà, the exile of the Guelphs, and the recovery of some abandoned fortresses in the countryside.

It was in this context that Braccio da Montone, in the service of the antipope Alexander V, besieged the Ghibelline Terni on September 14, 1410, which at first resisted "heroically" (according to chroniclers), except for surrendering at the next untenable siege in June, due in part to the scarcity of external support and above all to the divergences that suddenly came about between the two allied Ghibelline families that divided power in the city, namely the Castelli, precisely, and the Camporeali.

Braccio, who at that time had also taken possession of Rome, demanded to take possession of the suburban fortresses of Terni, and in the context of this conflict had Andrea Castelli and his sons, who militarily and politically dominated the city with the blessing and support of Ladislaus king of Naples, his adversary, assassinated after misleading them. Several years later, in 1424, Andrea's nephew Andreasso, the only male survivor of the family massacre, allegedly caused the death of Braccio, who had already been wounded after the War of L'Aquila, thus avenging his relatives, according to an oral tradition.

== The early 1500s ==
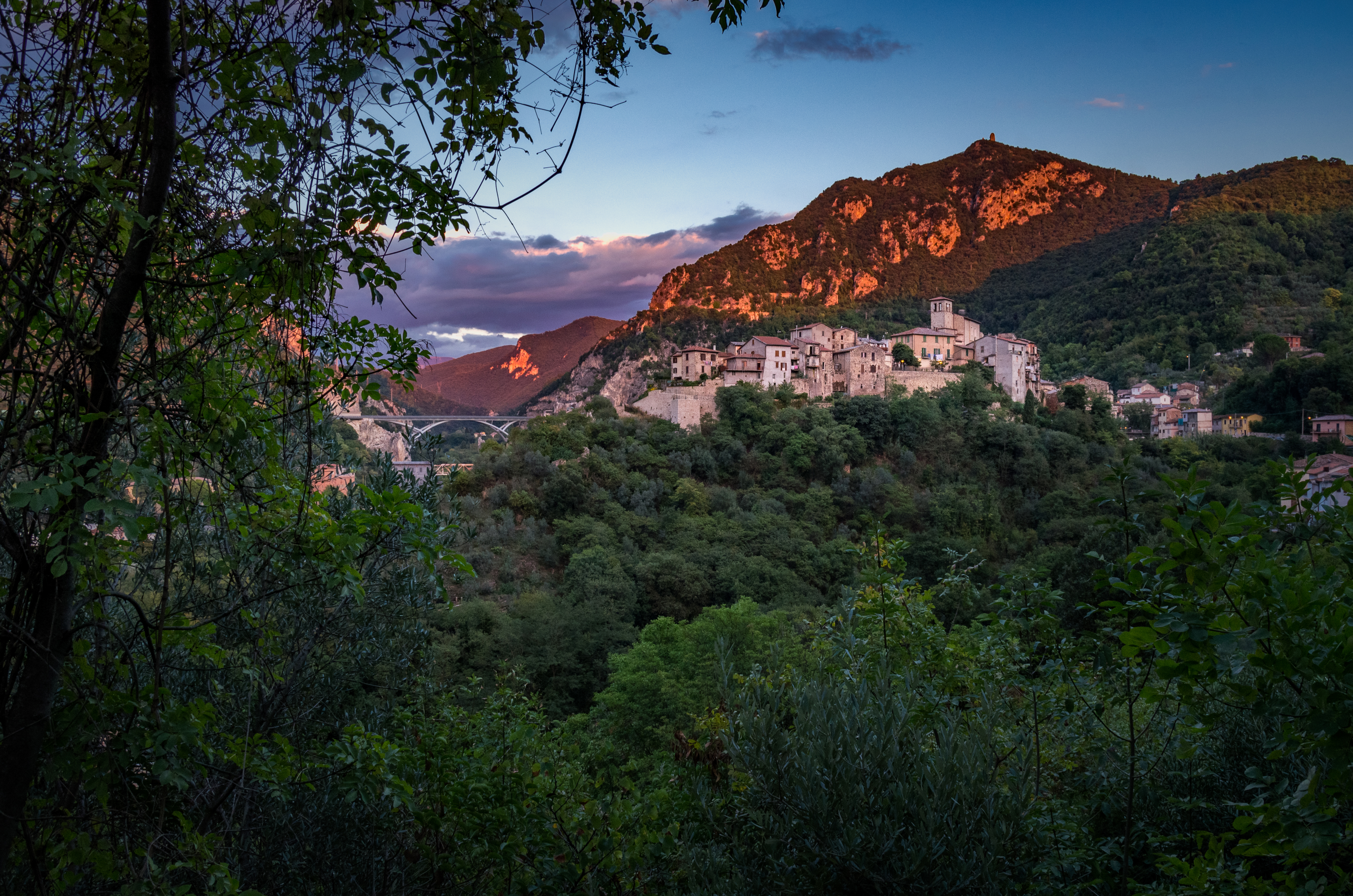
Papigno Castle (in the background, Mount Sgurgola, where the ruined Fortress of Monte San'Angelo is visible)

The siege carried out by the mercenary Braccio da Montone, coauthored and instigated by Spoleto and Narni, against Terni, would only sour relations, increasing the atavistic resentment on the part of the Ternians against the two allied rival cities. One fruit of this warlike action taken by the two Guelph municipalities against Terni would be the famous and terrible retaliation of the Sack of Narni, a century later, on July 17, 1527, in which the Ternians and Landsknechts, led by Sciarra Colonna, killed, razed and devastated the town of Narnia, reducing it to a pitiful state, from which the Narnians did not recover in the following centuries.

In fact, in that July of 1527 the Landsknechts, returning from the sack of Rome, took the field in Terni, which had sided with the Imperials and the Colonnas, and which wanted to take advantage of the situation to move war operations against Spoleto and Todi, where among other things the troops of the League of Cognac were camped.

The support for the Colonna policy and the benevolent reception given to the imperial army stemmed from an old intolerance of the city to the domineering aims of the Papacy, which, not only had stopped, often harshly, municipal expansionism, but had also altered the ancient municipal orders. In fact, to the vibrant protests and riots, in the second half of the fifteenth century, against the figure of the Governor and against the symbols of papal power, the papal authority had responded, in 1501 with the declaration of a "rebellious city," and in 1515 it retrenched in the policy of a downsizing of the Podestà's powers in favor of those of the Governor.

== Brave mercenaries and adventurers, the Banderari revolt and papal rule ==
Italy in the 15th and 16th centuries

The event that led to the final demise of the municipality was the revolt of the Banderari, which broke out on August 25, 1564, over old personal grudges and the inability of the Banderari to gain access to the Priory and the Council of Cerna. The killing of some nobles by members of the Banderari faction triggered the repression of Pope Pius IV, who sent, as Governor and Commissioner for Terni, Cardinal Monte dei Valenti, with broad inquisitorial and persecutory powers. In addition to the death sentences by beheading of the culprits, Monte dei Valenti also acknowledged precise responsibilities to the municipality, which was charged with all the expenses of its mission, of the new use of the areas owned by the convicts and of the refitting of the papal palaces. Thus it was that the municipality, unable to meet the debts incurred, decided to give up its centuries-old autonomy.

The two valiant condottieri brothers from Terni, Alessandro and Lucantonio Tomassoni, were famous for great military feats at the time. In the sixteenth century, the literary-adventurer Orazio Nucula was, starting in 1546, in the service of Juan De Vega, viceroy of Sicily in the empire of Charles V, and assisted him in important negotiations, accompanying him in the war in the Mediterranean against the Ottoman privateer Dragut; then he wrote the Commentaries on the War of Aphrodisia (Note: (Present-day Mahdia in Tunisia).) in Latin, dedicated to Pope Julius III.

== The 17th and 18th centuries ==
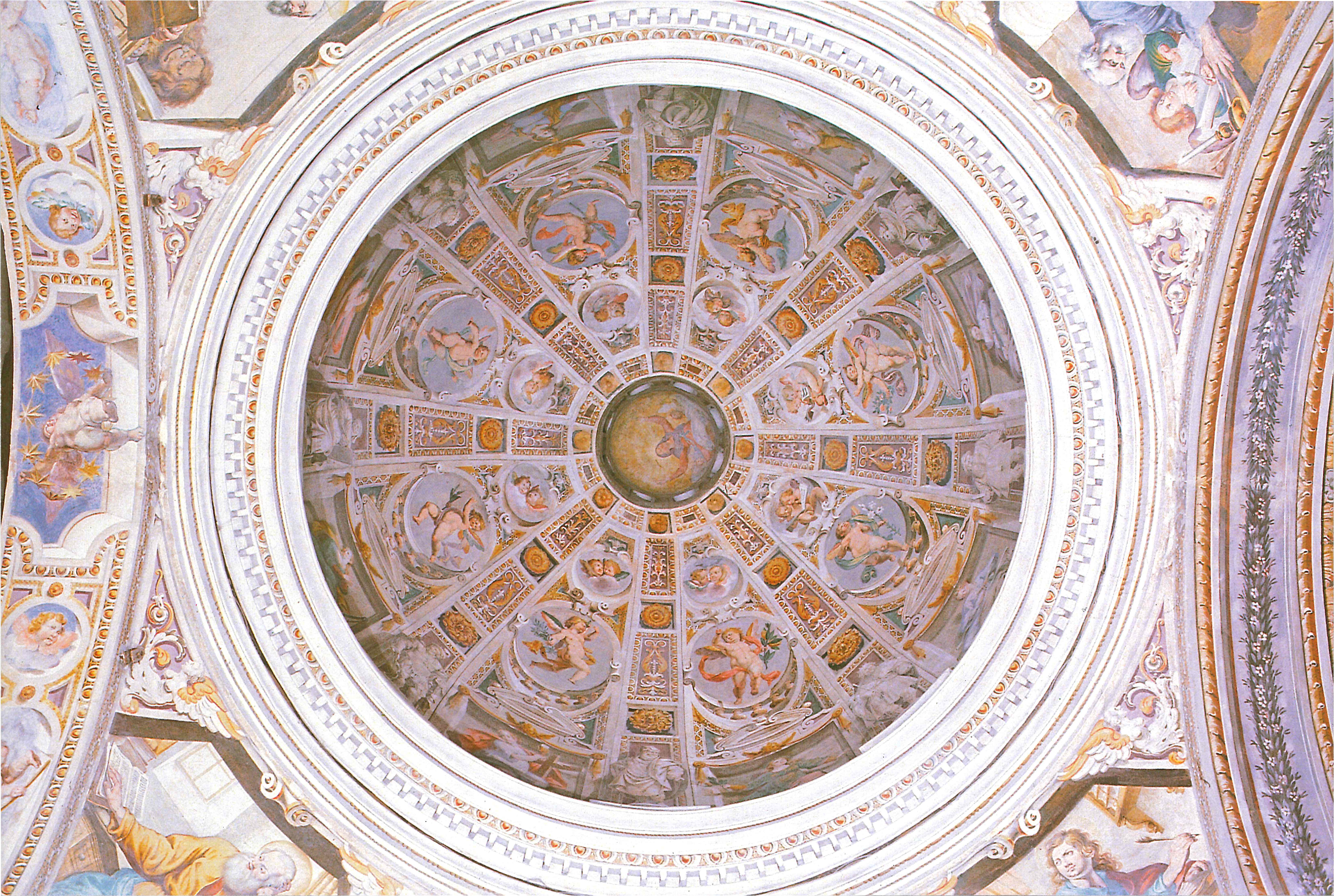
The Glory of the Virgin (Ludovico Carosi, 1636, Santa Maria del Carmine, Terni)

After the Council of Trent there began a period of about two centuries in which Terni, having lost its precise identity, found in Rome a secure point of reference. The Aldobrandini and Barberini families were patrons of the city for many years during the 17th century; Francesco Angeloni, a native of Terni, was secretary to Cardinal Ippolito Aldobrandini; Francesco Angelo Rapaccioli, also a native of Terni, was very close to Cardinal Maffeo Barberini, the future Pope Urban VIII; even the new patron saint, St. Valentine, was decided in Rome. Thus, important figures in art and culture landed, from Rome, in Terni: Antonio da Sangallo the Younger to direct the work of the Pauline quarry at the Marmore Falls and it was in Terni that he died; Jacopo Barozzi da Vignola and Carlo Fontana for the rebuilding of the Roman Bridge; Carlo Maderno for the Clementine quarry; and Girolamo Troppa as decorator of city villas and palaces.

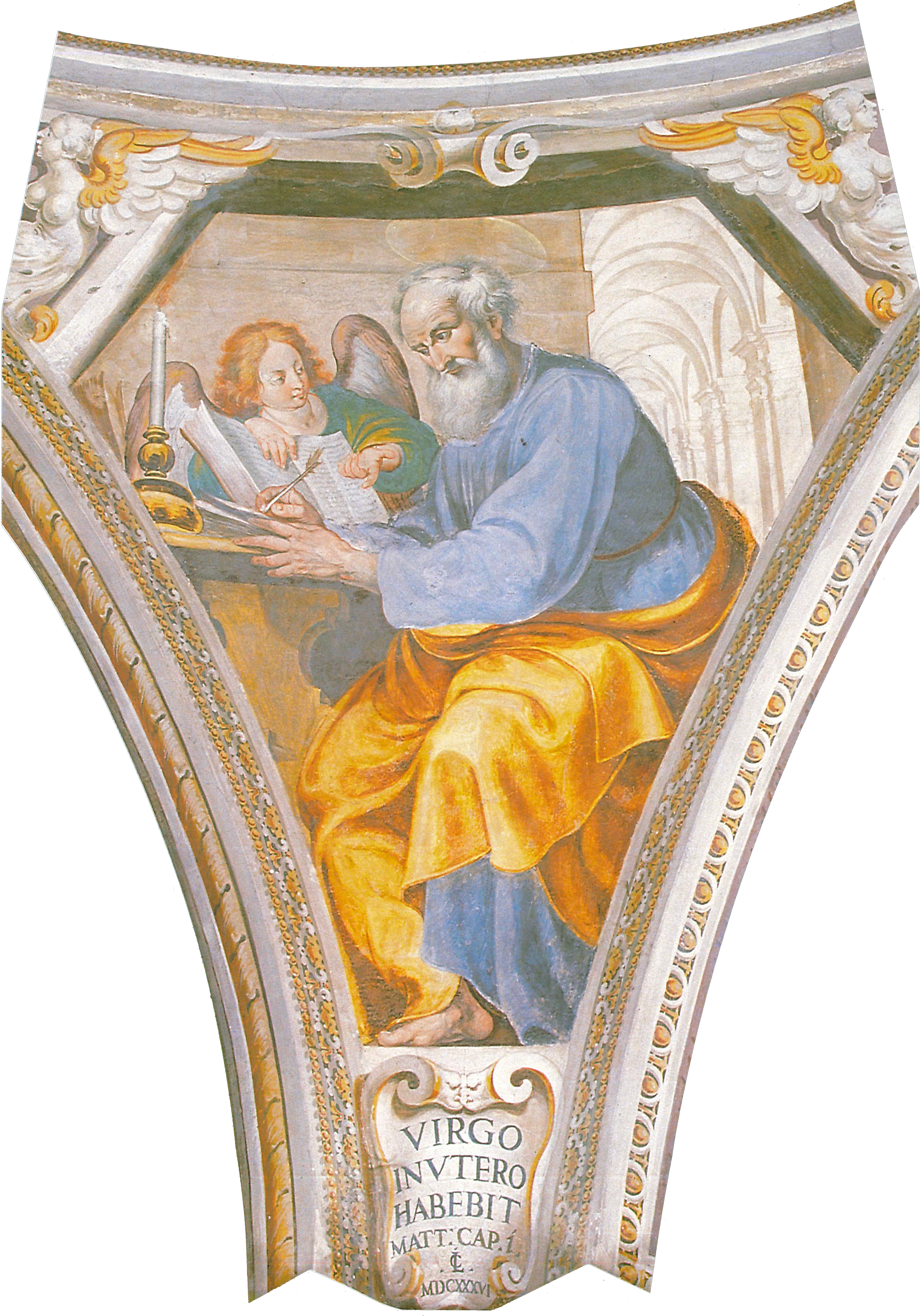
Detail of a dome spandrel with St. Matthew (Ludovico Carosi, 1636, Santa Maria del Carmine, Terni)

In 1657, for six months between May and December, the plague raged, coming from the Kingdom of Naples, where it had claimed many victims the previous summer. Despite public health measures and pleas to the city's patron saints, there were several deaths, so much so that the municipality was forced to set up a special cemetery area southwest of the city walls.

The other scourge, which affected this small community, were the numerous passages of foreign troops during the War of the Spanish Succession, the War of the Polish Succession, and, above all, the War of the Austrian Succession, which involved the continuous presence of armed men between 1742 and 1748. In addition to episodes of desertion, intolerance, and violence against the local population, there were also systematic plundering of the countryside, draining of municipal coffers, and famines.

On the eve of the Napoleonic period, Terni was part of the Spoleto Delegation, counted just over 8,000 souls, of which 40 percent were distributed in the countryside and the rest in the city. The diocese had 17 parishes with 80 churches and 10 religious houses. The clergy represented a substantial portion of the social fabric, was in charge of the schools, all marked by the spirit of the Counter-Reformation, and owned most of the public utilities. Donations and taxes were almost all distributed to religious foundations, which used them to support themselves and to maintain pious works. Agriculture, managed under metayage contracts, was based mainly on arboreal crops, particularly olives. Industries, which took advantage of the town's many waterways, included a hydraulic sawmill, open since 1715, a dobby opened in 1730, and the ironworks, whose concession to the Gazzoli Family was issued in 1794.

== From Napoleon to the Unification of Italy ==
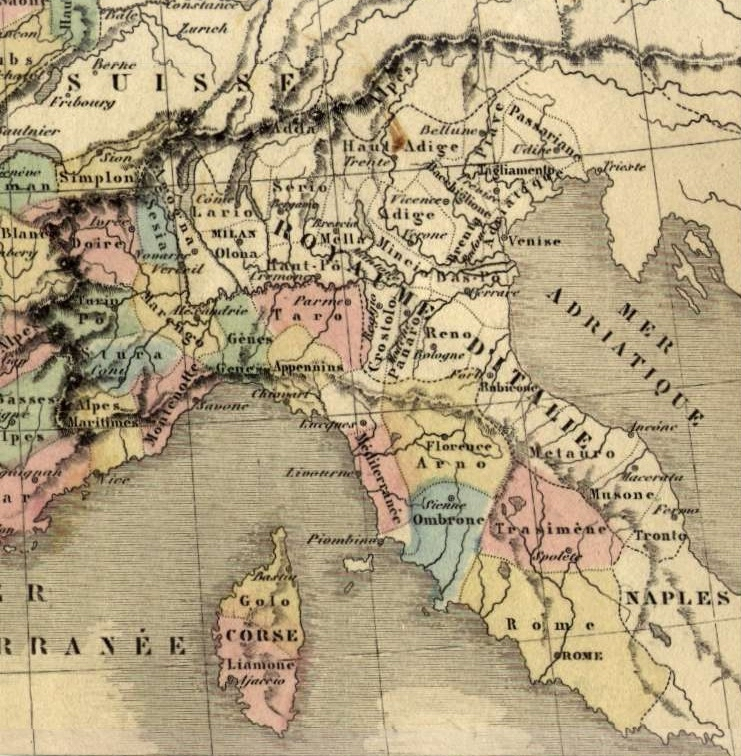
French departments in Italy during the Napoleonic occupation

The sleep of the small community was abruptly interrupted on February 16, 1798, when General Louis Alexandre Berthier from Spoleto dictated the conditions of surrender to the French vanguards. In March of the same year Terni was declared an urban cantonal municipality belonging to the Department of Clitunno, with Spoleto as its capital, which turned out, before the proclamation of the Roman Republic, to be the center of an autonomous republic.

Citizens, the undefeated generous French Nation removed from your eyes the blindfold, loosened your hands, finally broke those shackles that for so many years oppressed you. You are free. You are equal.

— Proclama al Popolo Ternano, dì 19 marzo 1798, anno 1º della Repubblica Romana una e indivisibile in Giorgio Brighi, Terni giacobina, in 'Memoria Storica', 16, 2000, p. 49

Geographically it was a short distance from the border between the territory of the Roman Republic, the term by which the old Papal State was renamed, in the hands of the French, and the Kingdom of the Two Sicilies, in the hands of the Bourbons of Naples. The French occupation was neither easy nor painless: the secularization of schools and public life, as well as the good intentions of scientific and technical development, were accompanied by compulsory conscription, annonary taxation, forced expropriations, gratuitous violence by the French armies, encamped in the western part of the city, and the robberies of brigands, ambushed in the south and east. To all this was added the presence of about six thousand armies, from the Kingdom of Naples, encamped between Piediluco and Marmore.

A popular uprising against the occupiers and a vain attempt to suppress it preceded by only a few weeks the arrival, on August 14, 1799, of the Austro-Russian troops of General Gerlanitz, which effectively ended the brief Jacobin period.

...Therefore, concur, people of Terni, to render new services to the Homeland, in order to secure more and more the Worship of our Holy Religion, your possessions, and the tranquility of your families, and to demonstrate with an outpouring of heart your commitment, and your gratitude to the invading Austro-Russian Armies, which broke the yoke of an infamous freedom, and a dreamed equality.

— Proclama del Generale Antonio Gerlanitz, in Vincenzo Pirro, Il Comune Repubblicano, in Storia illustrata delle città dell'Umbria, op. cit., p. 251

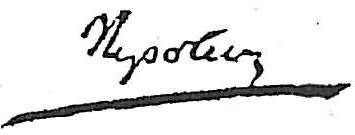
Autograph signature of Napoleon Bonaparte

The years of the Napoleonic Empire again saw Terni crossed and occupied by French armies destined for Rome and Naples. First, in the context of the war against Ferdinand IV of Naples, in early 1801, in compliance with the conditions of the Peace of Foligno, a French expeditionary force, commanded by Joachim Murat, took possession of the city and its surroundings. Then, in 1807 and 1808, during the war that followed the Third Coalition, other armies passed through and other duties were imposed, in goods and products, until in July 1809 Terni, as part of the District of Spoleto, became part of the Department of Trasimeno, not incorporated into the Kingdom of Italy, but, together with the Department of the Tiber, dependent directly on the imperial crown.

However, in May 1814 Pius VII, on his return from France, where he had been led by Napoleon, and on his way to Rome, passed through Terni: this was the formal act of the city's return under papal power.

Despite the enthusiasm for the event and a substantial loyalty to the Church, there remained a strong need to scale back the pervasiveness of the clergy in civic affairs, although this attitude was still very resigned. In February 1831 Terni welcomed, but not in all its social components, the vanguards of General Sercognani's army, coming down from the Legations and the Marca, determined to head for Rome; on that occasion it became part of the territory of the United Provinces, with Bologna as its capital, formally distinct from the rest of the Papal State. For about a month, the insurgents' regimented troops used Terni as a rear-guard for war efforts against Rieti and Civita Castellana; however, Papal resistance, the failure of France to help, and the reaction of Austria, which had in the meantime retaken the Legations, induced Sercognani to abandon the enterprise.

Terni's new submission back to the pope was immediate. The clericization of institutions and the excessive papal centralism were accompanied by years of discreet prosperity: the city, in which new industrial initiatives sprang up, such as a cotton mill in 1846, a woolen mill, and in which the modernization of the ironworks was carried out, did not depopulate the countryside, which continued to be productive thanks to mixed farming and sharecropping. In 1846 the railroad that connected Terni to Rome was introduced.

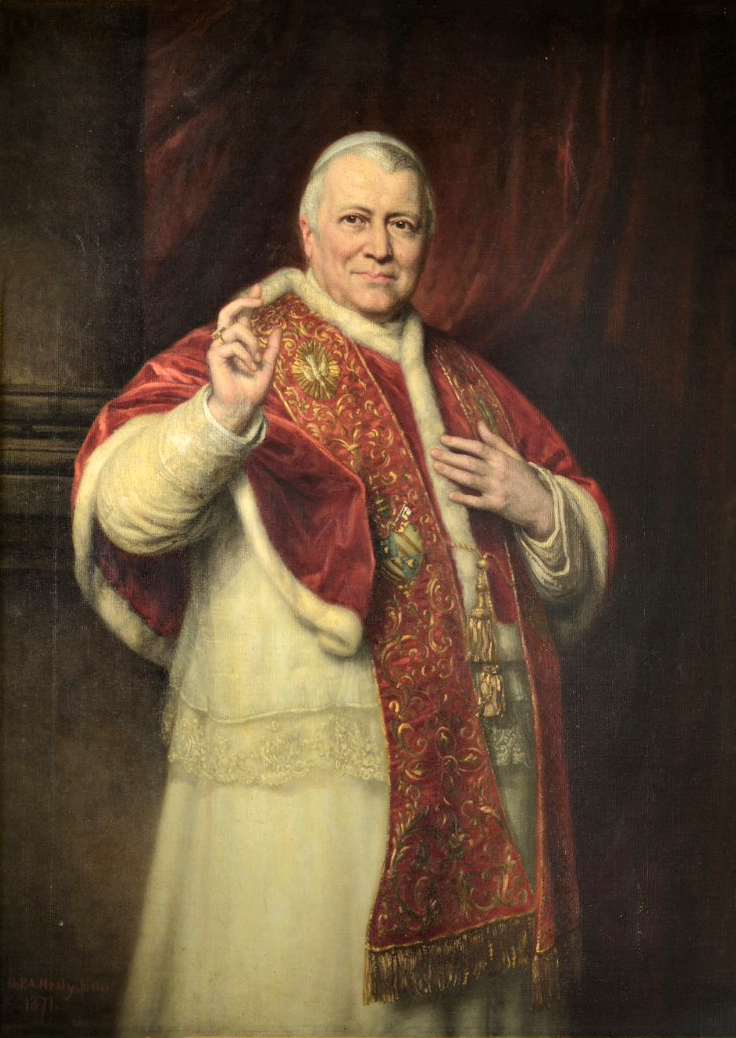
Pope Pius IX.

During the pontificate of Pius IX the flurry of neo-Guelphism and Italic patriotism that infected the whole Papal States was also felt in Terni, where Ciceruacchio, a well-known agitator of the people, at that time in favor of Pius IX's policies, was hosted with the highest honors.

In April 1848 a few dozen volunteers from Terni took part in the First War of Independence, under the command of General Ferrari, distinguishing themselves in the Venetian theater of war; however, the defeat of the papal forces and the withdrawal of the troops, decreed by Pius IX, brought about a change in patriotic sentiments in Terni as well, which turned no longer toward neo-Guelphism but toward the democratic republicanism of Giuseppe Mazzini.

The experience of the Roman Republic of 1849 marked the beginning of this political turn: popular support was quite substantial, so much so that Terni became the headquarters of the Apennine Observation Corps. In July of that year, however, even this brief phase of liberation from the yoke of the papal monarchy came to an end. Some Ternians followed Giuseppe Garibaldi as he fled to Romagna; one of them, Giovanni Froscianti, would become one of his most trusted collaborators.

== Annexation to the Kingdom of Italy ==
The return of Pius IX provoked both the flight of those who had supported the Roman Republic period by the sword, and the detachment between those who conducted public affairs, aligned on at least apolitical positions, and those who had participated wholeheartedly in the 1848 uprisings. However, Terni, led by revolutionary Mazzinian exponents, grudgingly accepted the directives of the Perugia Committee, which, aligned in favor of Cavour's policies, played a role of absolute pre-eminence over the rest of the other Umbrian communities. Popular sentiments of clear dissatisfaction with papal power resulted in demonstrations against the millstone tax in 1850 and against the taxation of artistic and artisan activities in 1852. Between July and August 1860, while Garibaldi was attempting to penetrate papal territory, a contingent of zouaves commanded by Colonel De Pimodan quartered in the city. Recalled by the arrival of Piedmontese troops in Marche, the French left the city headed to support the battle of Castelfidardo. On September 20 of that year, General Filippo Brignone's Piedmontese bersaglieri entered Terni through the Spoletina Gate and remained there, until the following year, as Terni became the headquarters of the XV Division. The Plebiscite that followed and formalized the annexation to the Kingdom of Italy saw, out of 3672 voters, only 1 vote against 3461 votes in favor. The first post-unification mayor was elected on December 1, 1860.

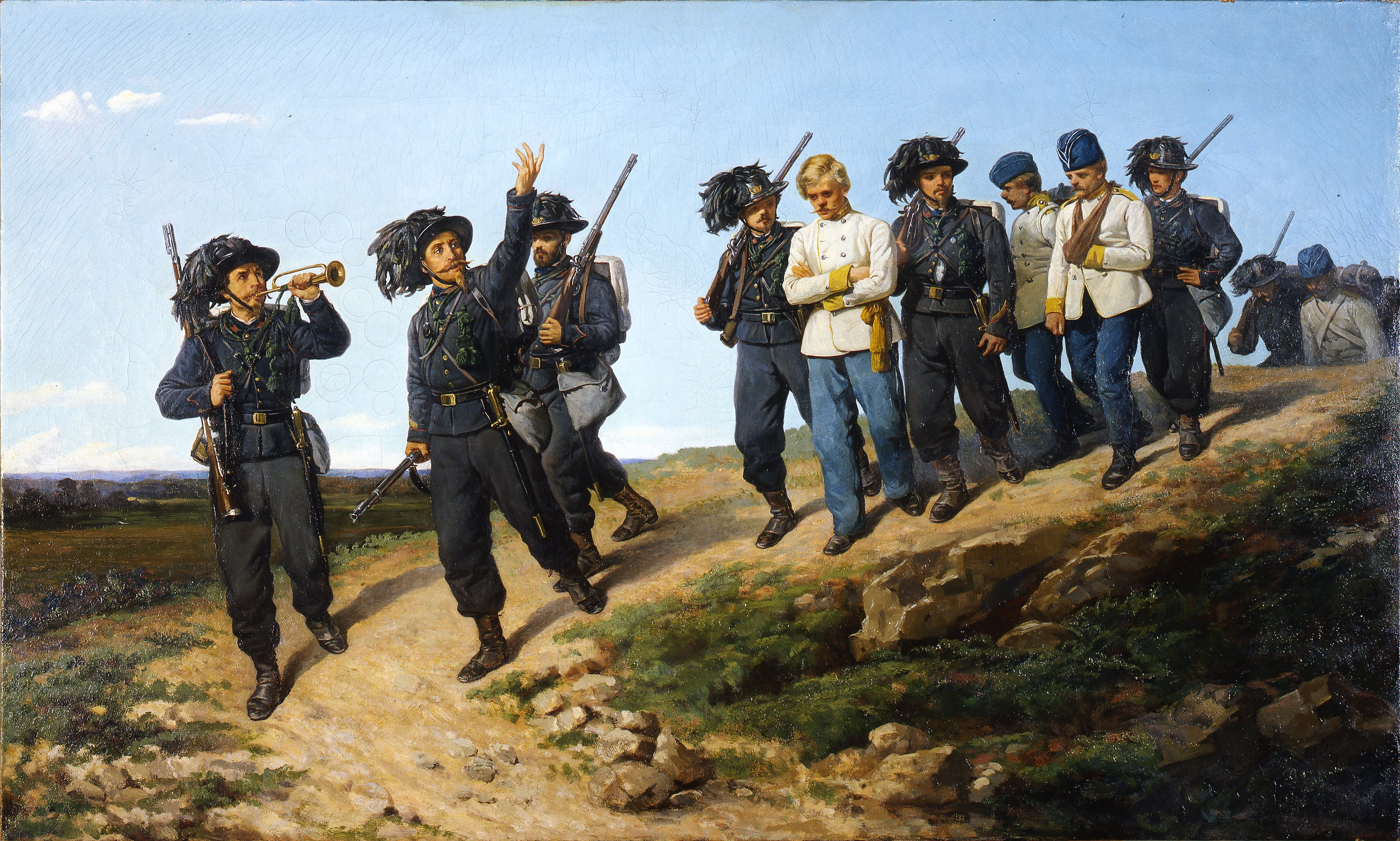
Bersaglieri in reconnaissance

Its position as a border town between the Kingdom and the Papal States soon made it the base of support for political and military initiatives aimed at the liberation of Rome. In June 1867 a hundred Terni patriots attempted to take on Rome, but were stopped by Italian troops. Shortly thereafter, Menotti Garibaldi left Terni and stationed himself at Nerola to await reinforcements, which arrived from the Umbrian city on October 13, when he attacked Montelibretti. In Terni, the Relief Committee for the Enfranchisement of Rome was organized to flank the National Committee, which, under the direction of Francesco Crispi and Giuseppe Guerzoni, had recently established itself in the city. However, it was Enrico and Giovanni Cairoli who broke the deadlock: leaving from Terni with just 75 volunteers, they crossed the border, but were stopped by the papists at Villa Glori, where Enrico died. Garibaldi, who had also escaped from Caprera thanks to the help of Froscianti, arrived on October 22 in Terni, which was already full of volunteers from all over Italy; he left soon after and joined his son and the other volunteers at Passo Corese, but the feat was thwarted by General De Failly's French guns at Mentana on November 3. What Garibaldi's and Mazzini's volunteers could not do, diplomacy and the troops of General Raffaele Cadorna did, who organized his headquarters in Terni on September 6, 1870, while the soldiers of the Piedmontese IV Army Corps took up positions on the borders; a military hospital was set up in the city and the necessary daily provisions for the troops were provided by rail. On September 11, 1870, Cadorna issued the Proclamation with which he began the war campaign; on September 20, exactly ten years after entering Terni, the Savoy bersaglieri crossed Porta Pia.

== Industrialization ==
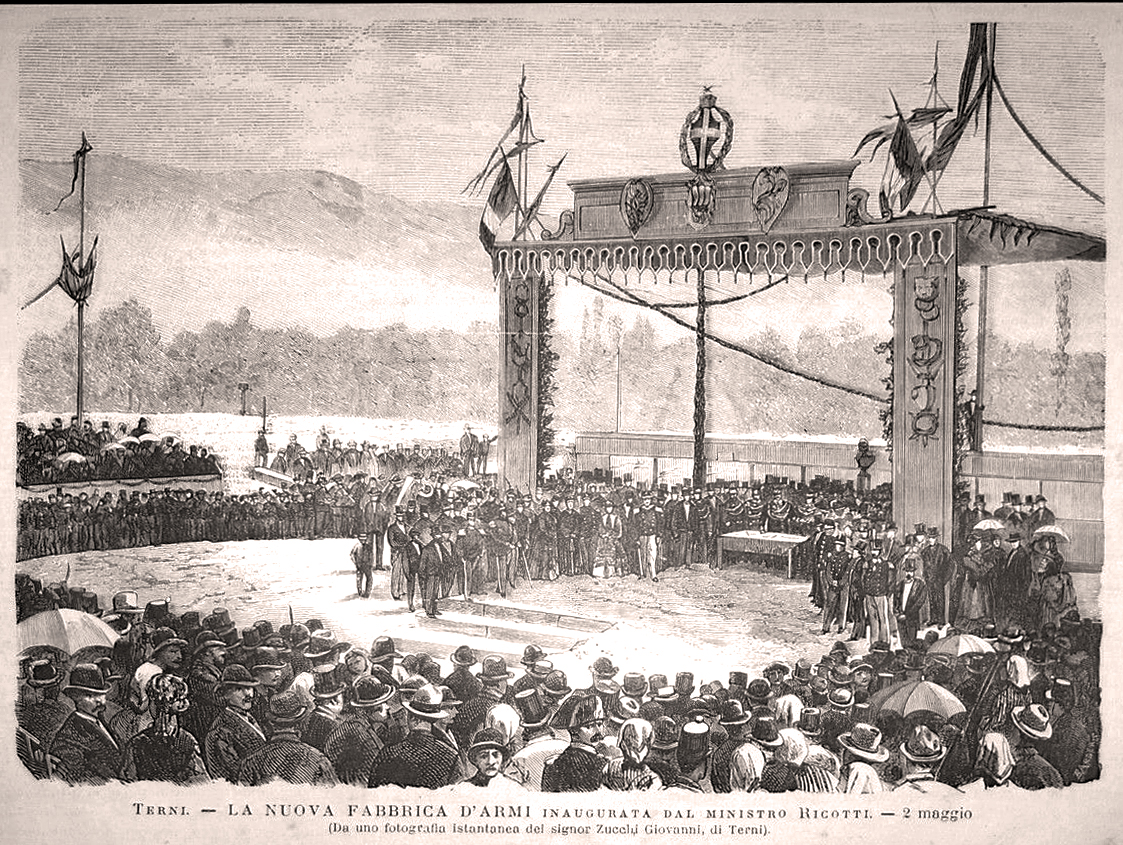
The new Arms Factory inaugurated by Minister Ricotti on May 2 (woodcut, 1875)

After the annexation to the Kingdom of Italy, industry, as the engine of the city's economy, was central to the wishes of the Commissioner for Umbria, Gioacchino Napoleone Pepoli, and to the choices of local administrators, who, despite serious financial difficulties, wanted to encourage manufacturing settlements, offering the potential exploitation of two hundred thousand horsepower, obtainable from the ample availability of water resources. By 1875, after the defeats suffered in the Third War of Independence, the General Staff was pressing for a national military industry. The spokesperson for this need was Captain Luigi Campofregoso, who had on his side, both the active work of the deputy and former Garibaldian Vincenzo Stefano Breda, who was convinced that Terni was the strategically ideal place for military plant engineering, and the press campaign of the Gazzetta d'Italia, which supported Breda's theses. Construction of the Arms Factory was begun in 1875 and the plant went into operation in 1881.

In 1879 Cassian Bon, a Belgian entrepreneur, bought the Giovanni Lucovich e C. foundry, which had been established a few years earlier by some Milanese and German industrialists. In 1881 Cassian Bon founded the 'Società degli Altiforni e Fonderia di Terni,' and in 1886, together with Vincenzo Stefano Breda, at that time president of the 'Società Veneta per le Imprese e le Costruzioni Pubbliché', a company that used state capital for building and plant works, he began to carry out the major project of a steel production plant. The purpose of the enterprise, formalized by a special commission appointed by Minister of the Navy Benedetto Brin, was to produce armor and cannons for warships.

In 1884 the ironworks was modernized and enlarged; in 1885 Alessandro Centurini of Genoa began construction of a woolen and jute mill; in 1890 Antonio Bosco of Turin built a factory for the production of agricultural implements; in 1896 the 'Italian Society of Calcium Carbide, Acetylene and Other Gases' was established, which operated not only factories for the production of calcium carbide but also hydroelectric power plants; in 1883 the Terni-Sulmona railway was inaugurated. Terni was the fourth Italian city, in order of time, to have public lighting by electricity.

At the beginning of the 20th century, Terni became one of Italy's first industrial cities. Within a few decades, industrialization quadrupled the labor force, mainly due to the arrival of immigrants, almost always of peasant background, from the rest of Umbria, but also from Lazio, Marche, Tuscany, Romagna and the rest of northern Italy. Industrialization also created logistical problems, however, due to the scarcity of housing and the inadequacy of public services, to which were added the prejudices of the local people against immigrants and the reluctance of landowners to grant the necessary areas and water rights for facilities and buildings. On the other hand, the industrial initiatives all came from outside, without the involvement of the local bourgeoisie.

With the industrialization process that began in the second half of the 19th century, it also became necessary to educate young people in technical and professional activities. To this end, following a special decree of the Extraordinary Commissioner for the Provinces of Umbria, in 1861, the Regio Istituto Tecnico (later the Istituto Industriale and Liceo Scientifico) was established, one of the first four in Italy, which towards the end of the nineteenth century, under the leadership of Prof. Luigi Corradi, became renowned attracting young people from all over Italy.

== Between the Two World Wars ==
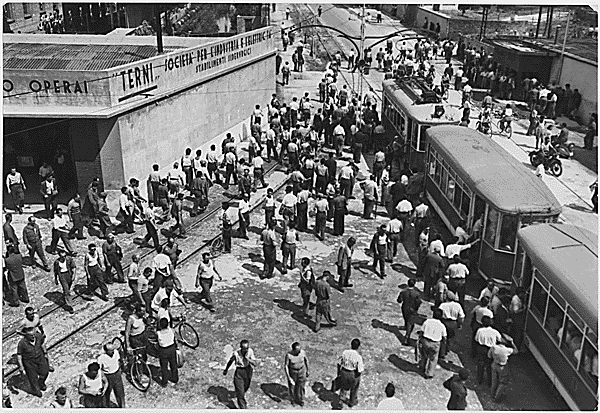
Workers at the Terni steel mills after World War II.

The new century began with a gradual consolidation of the 'Società degli Alti Forni e Fonderie di Terni' in the field of the war industry: it stimulated technical research into new forms of steel casting and rolling, divested the old converters and acquired the more modern Martin-Siemens, of which it patented a variant called 'Martin-Terni,' which spread throughout the world steel industry of the time. In the Terni factories the shells of the ships Ruggero di Lauria were built with the Schneider method, with nickel steel the shells of the ships Francesco Ferruccio, Benedetto Brin, Regina Margherita, and with a method devised by his steel engineers, moreover similar to the Krupp system, the shells of the ships Regina Elena, Andrea Doria, Roma, Conte di Cavour, Giulio Cesare and Vittorio Emanuele. In 1905 he founded, in La Spezia, with the English Vickers, a factory for the production of naval cannons. He began production not only of armor for battleships but also of cannon and shell components during World War I, at least until the opening of the Ansaldo factories in Genoa. In 1922, after acquiring the 'Italian Society for Calcium Carbide, Acetylene and Other Gases,' which also controlled STET, a company that operated the urban tramway service and that of the Terni-Ferentillo tramway, it expanded into the energy sector, with the acquisition of all existing hydroelectric power plants, and into the chemical sector, changing its name to 'Terni Society for Industry and Electricity'. The 'Arms Factory' produced weapons of various types, including the Carcano Mod. 91, which equipped the Italian army for many years: during World War I it churned out more than 2,000 rifles a day; among other things, one of these examples, produced in Terni in 1940 ended up in the hands of Lee Harvey Oswald and was used by him in the assassination of John Fitzgerald Kennedy on November 22, 1963. The 'Bosco' established itself in constructions for aircraft hangars and in 1924 began the production of metal products, such as hydroextractors, autoclaves, and kettles. By 1927 the 'Lanificio e Jutificio Centurini' was, in terms of employees and production, the second Italian factory in the sector; in the 1920s the 'Tipografico Alterocca' put 30% of the picture postcards that were printed in Italy on the market.

The presence of workers in the city's social fabric was enormous, considering that this category constituted 70 percent of the resident population at the beginning of the century. Between 1877 and 1900, the first Mutual Aid Societies were founded in Terni, which brought economic and medical assistance to working-class families, while in 1901 after the Pelloux laws, the Terni Chamber of Labor, the first in Umbria, which had already been founded in 1890, was reconstituted, while on December 26, 1904, the first Republican Youth Federation in the history of Italy was founded in Terni, which was associated together with the Italian Republican Party, which created the regional headquarters of Umbria in Terni in the same year. The issuance of harsh factory regulations by the steel mills' Corporate Management on Easter Eve 1907 provoked a reaction from the workers, under the leadership of the Chamber of Labor and not the unions. The resulting lockout of the gates by the company reduced four thousand families to starvation for three months, which were saved by emigration and the solidarity of workers from other local industries and some cities, including, above all, Genoa. By 1927 the Chamber of Labor had nearly three thousand members and five mutual aid societies, ran medical care and education for workers. Also notable was the women's labor movement, repeatedly promoting strikes against low wages and working conditions in the factories; Carlotta Orientale, a worker in the 'Jutificio Centurini', was national secretary of the Unione Sindacale Italiana, during World War I. In the 1919 general elections, the Socialists collected a 71 percent majority. Although some five hundred fascist squadrists operated there in 1921, Terni remained the only Umbrian municipality under socialist administration until October 17, 1922.

Under the political impetus of the National Fascist Party (PNF) the 'Terni,' as the Steelworks was more briefly called, financed the construction of workers' housing, up to whole neighborhoods, even two churches; in addition to the after-work activities it established company outlets, promoted associational clubs, and endowed the city with sports and recreational facilities. The concession of the exploitation of the entire Nera-Velino water system and significant military orders pushed 'Terni' to become one of Italy's largest industrial groups: (Note: For a comprehensive assessment of 'Terni's' activities, especially in the steel and electrical fields, see Terni - Società per l'Industria e l'Elettricità. Anonima. Sede in Roma, 1884-1934, Genova 1934) joining IRI in 1933, in addition to churning out steel, it produced in a year about a billion kilowatt hours of electricity from power plants in the Salto and Turano river system in Lazio, and the Vomano in Abruzzo; it produced ammonia exclusively at its chemical plants in Nera Montoro according to the Casale process, having founded in 1925 the SIRI, 'Società Italiana per le Ricerche Industriali,' which specialized in the elaboration of patents for the chemical industry, especially in the production of ammonia, methanol, and hydrocarbon chemistry calcium carbide and nitrogen compounds at its new plant in Papigno.

In 1927 the 'Società Umbra Prodotti chimici,' later changed to 'Viscosa Umbra,' began the production of carbon sulfide. In 1939 the 'Società Anonima Industria Gomma Sintetica' (SAIGS) plant was built at the initiative of IRI and Pirelli, for the synthesis of butadiene from calcium carbide.

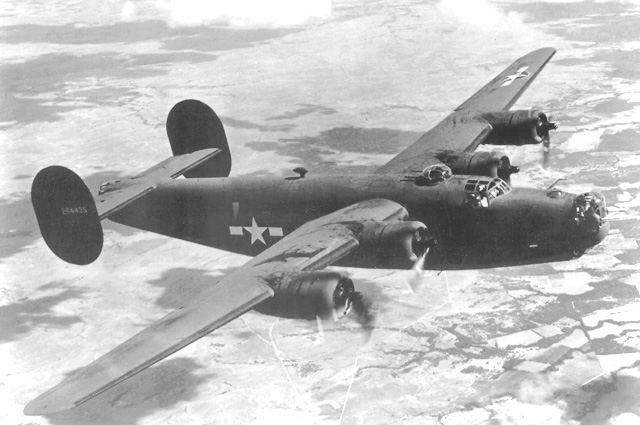
Consolidated B-24 Liberator Bomber

The prosperity of industry was accompanied, however, by administrative difficulties, as the PNF always oscillated between those who supported industry wholeheartedly and those who leaned, on the other hand, on the never-quenched anti-industrial spirit. The administration's immobility was partly overcome after 1930, when the adoption of a general land-use plan made it possible to implement the first substantial interventions to the infrastructure, although it was precisely from that period that large-scale industry began to be the real promoter of city life. The pro-industry part of the PNF, headed personally by Mussolini, decided in 1926 to establish the Province of Terni, and the municipal territory was expanded to include as many as seven previous municipalities.

In 1924 the clandestine propaganda of the Italian Communist Party began to proselytize within the steel mills; in 1931 about two hundred workers turned out to be members. Even in 1936 leaflets supporting Republican Spain were printed. The clandestinity was not enough to avoid charges of reconstituting the Communist Party and sentences of confinement, imposed on several dozen people. In 1943, with the contribution of many workers, the 'Antonio Gramsci' partisan brigade was formed, which operated during the Resistance in the Umbria-Marche Apennines.

=== The bombing of 1943 ===
A major industrial node, Terni was subjected to no less than one hundred and eight bombings by the Allies during their war campaign in Italy: on August 11, 1943, an aerial bombardment, without the UNPA being able to raise the alarm in time, caused 350 casualties, almost all civilians; at the end of the war just under two thousand deaths would be counted and only 17 percent of the buildings left unharmed. Thanks to the action of the workers, the retreating Germans were unsuccessful in their intent to sabotage or dismantle industrial plants, with the exception of power generation and the SAIGS plant. General Alexander's British entered the city on June 13, 1944. For the above reasons, Terni was awarded the War Cross for Military Valor.

== Reconstruction ==
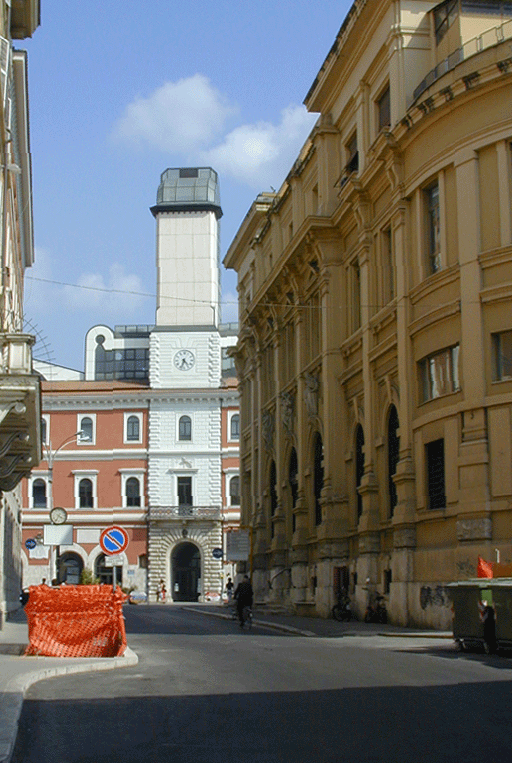
Via Plebiscito towards Republic Square

The wartime divestments turned out to be deleterious for Terni steel: between 1947 and 1948 more than two thousand workers were laid off, and after the elaboration of the Sinigaglia plan, which shifted strategic production to the sea, seven hundred were laid off in 1952 and another two thousand workers and employees the following year. However, the production capacity and skills of the workers who had survived the war made it possible to recover the entire hydroelectric system and to expand it with the construction of new power plants on the Nera and the Tiber; a direct line with Genoa was built to feed the new Ilva steel plant in Cornigliano.

However, in 1962, with the establishment of Enel, all of Terni's energy sources were nationalized. This was shortly followed by the spin-off of the other activities: the electrochemical plant at Nera Montoro was sold to Anic; in 1967 the Papigno plant passed to Eni; and the steel activities were incorporated into Finsider. The production of steel products itself remained in the background, as most of the emerging industrial initiatives, such as the electronuclear industry, were boycotted by IRI, which diverted production to other plants, despite the fact that Terni also excelled in steel research: suffice it to think of the discovery of the 'Terni effect,' that is, the paradox of the increase in temperature of large castings when subjected to cooling in water. The most important industrial initiative of this period was the construction of 'Terninoss,' a plant for the production of stainless flat-rolled products, thanks to a joint venture between Finsider and United States Steel; the demand for stainless steel fostered the development of the factory, which came to produce about one hundred and fifty thousand tons of rolled products annually.

The 1980s were particularly difficult for the Terni industry, with a significant contraction in employment and a major downsizing of production; a way out was identified in 1988, when top management and IRI decided to focus production on special steels. In 1994 the company was privatized, with the German multinational ThyssenKrupp purchasing the entire ownership a few years later.

Of the other production facilities, the Viscose plant was closed in the 1950s, the 'Lanificio e Jutificio Centurini' ceased operations in 1970, and SIRI closed its doors in June 1985, despite the great industrial successes of the 1950s. In 1949 SAIGS was sold to Montecatini, which reconverted the plants to produce synthetic polymers. In 1960 production of 'Meraklon' began, followed by 'Montivel'and 'Moplefan,' all materials designed and synthesized in the plant's research laboratories, where Giulio Natta also worked. In the early 1970s the plant was divided into various production subunits, hinging on polypropylene in granules, staple, film, and wire; in the 1980s and 1990s these productions, like those of the Nera Montoro plant, were acquired by various foreign multinationals. The 'Arms Factory,' while undergoing an inevitable downsizing after World War II, under the name of 'Stabilimento Militare Armamento Leggero,' continued to be one of the national sites for the maintenance of Italian Army and NATO weapons.

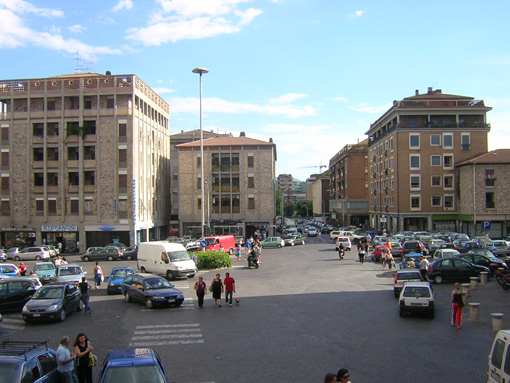
Mario Ridolfi Square

Other factories have been renovated and converted: that of Papigno into film studios, that of Officine Bosco into the Multimedia Center, and that of SIRI into facilities operating in the tertiary sector and the city's museum system.

Since the early 1990s, a radical change has been made to the city center, hinging on the "three historic centers" of the Clai district as the center of the Roman city, the Duomo district as the center of the medieval city, and the axis Piazza Europa, Piazza della Repubblica, Corso Tacito as the center of the modern city.

The city in the post-World War II period expanded far beyond the working-class villages of the early 20th century, developing on four axes radiating around the central core and posing to the new master plan by Mario Ridolfi, and its subsequent variants, the problem of the livability of the suburbs and their connection with the rest of the city. The road system had to overcome the old scheme of the single preferential axis of the Flaminia, contextualizing the projects in an interregional sphere, such as the Rieti-Terni-Civitavecchia route (SS675 and SS79 bis), the Strada statale 3 bis Tiberina and the logistics platform, still unrealized, all essential for the industries of the Terni area and its tertiary sector.

== See also ==
- Terni
- Province of Terni
- Umbria

== Bibliography ==
- Luigi Lanzi, Terni, la città e i dintorni. Edizioni Thyrus, Arrone (TR) 2002
- Elia Rossi Passavanti, Sommario della storia di Terni dalle origini all'Impero fascista. Damasso, Roma 1939, OCLC 162497495
- AAVV, Storia Illustrata delle città dell'Umbria, a cura di Raffaele Rossi, Terni, a cura di Michele Giorgini, 2 vv. Elio Sellino Editore, Milano 1994, ISBN 88-236-0049-9
- L'Umbria - Manuali per il territorio, Terni. Edindustria, Roma 1980
- Franco Bonelli, Lo sviluppo di una grande impresa in Italia. La Terni dal 1884 al 1962. Einaudi, Torino 1975, OCLC 3040531
- Valentina Leonelli, Paolo Renzi, Claudia Andreani, Cristina Ranucci, Interamna Nahartium - Materiali per il Museo Archeologico di Terni. A cura di Vincenzo Pirro - Collana Bibliotheca di Memoria Storica Edizioni Thyrus, Terni 1997
- Marcello Gaggiotti, Dorica Manconi, Liliana Mercando, Monika Verzàr, Guide Archeologiche Laterza, Umbria Marche. Laterza, Roma-Bari 1980
- Lodovico Silvestri, Collezione di memorie storiche tratte dai protocolli delle antiche riformanze della città di Terni dal 1387 al 1816. Edizioni Thyrus, Terni 1977, OCLC 29784924
- Francesco Angeloni, Historia di Terni. Roma 1666. III ed. Terni 1966, OCLC 51257254
- Renato Covino (a cura di), Le industrie di Terni: schede su aziende, infrastrutture e servizi. Giada, Narni (TR) 2002, ISBN 88-87288-16-X
- Giancarlo Tarzia, Gabriella Tomassini, Terni XVI-XX secolo: bibliografia. Vecchiarelli, Manziana 1996, ISBN 88-85316-65-4
- 'Rassegna Economica', periodico trimestrale della CCIAA di Terni, varie annate
- 'Memoria Storica', Rivista del Centro di Studi Storici di Terni, Edizioni Thyrus, Arrone (TR), varie annate, ISSN 1125-3886
- Aldo Tarquini, La città di Mario Ridolfi. Architettura, urbanistica, storia, arte, cinema, fotografia. De Luca editori d'Arte, Roma 2006, ISBN 88-8016-705-7
- Walter Mazzilli, "Da Piazza Maggiore alla rotonda dell'Obelisco. Le vie e le piazze di Terni". Fondazione Cassa di Risparmio di Terni e Narni, 2009
