= Sant'Alò, Terni =

Coordinates: 42.562240°N 12.644294°E

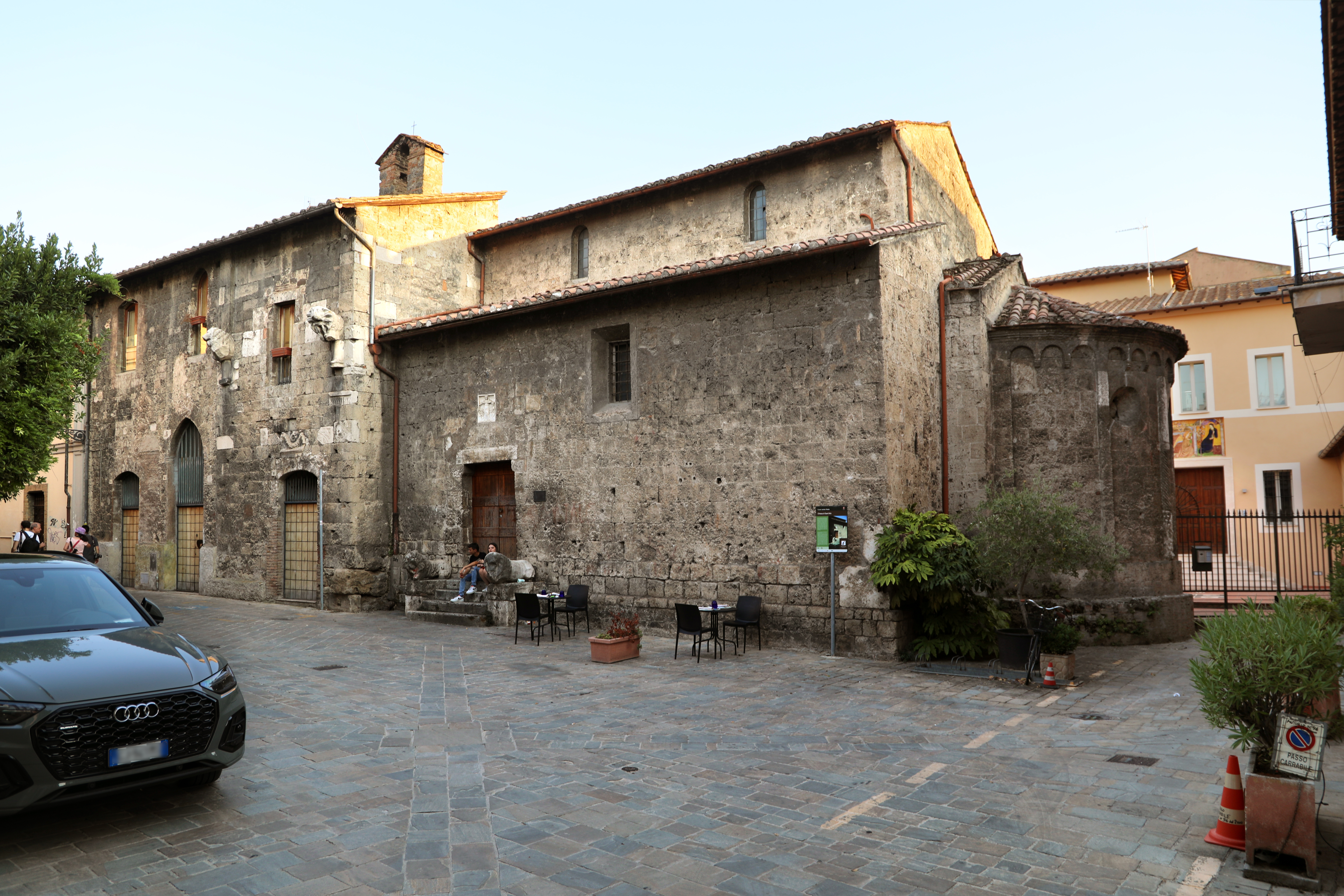
- Sant'Alò, Terni
- Country: Italy
- Denomination: Roman Catholic

The church of Sant'Alò is an early-medieval Roman Catholic church in Terni, Umbria, in Italy. It is dedicated to Saint Eligio (Aloysius), patron of the jewelers.

Putatively built atop the site of an Ancient Roman temple, this church was originally built in the 12th century, and granted by the bishop to an order of cloistered Augustinian monks, who built an adjacent monastery. The interior is heavily frescoed, including fragments of a 12th-century Crucifixion. The walls and facade incorporate spolia, including marble lion depictions, from Roman ruins.
