= Terni =

City in Umbria, Italy

- Comune
- Comune di Terni
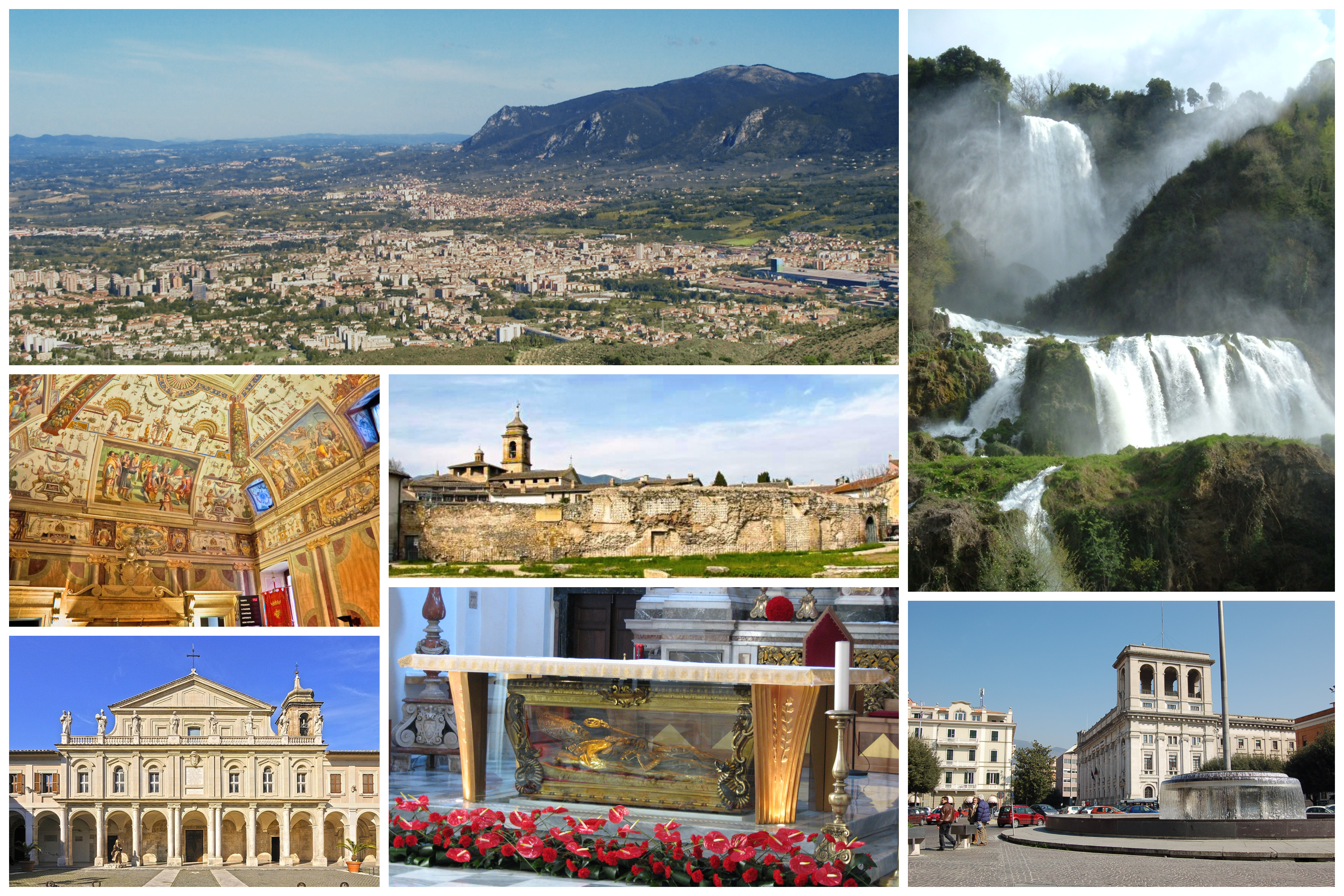
- From top left, anti-clockwise: view of Terni; City Council Hall; Terni Cathedral; Relics of Saint Valentine; Piazza Tacito; and Marmore Waterfalls. In the middle: Anfiteatro Fausto.

- Flag Coat of arms

- Location within Italy Location within Umbria
- Coordinates: 42°33′43″N 12°38′29″E
- Country: Italy
- Region: Umbria
- Province: Terni (TR)
- Frazioni: Acquapalombo, Appecano, Battiferro, Cecalocco, Cesi, Collegiacone, Collescipoli, Collestatte, Giuncano Alto, Giuncano Scalo, Marmore, Miranda, Papigno, Piediluco, Poggio Lavarino, Polenaco, Porzano, Pracchia, Rocca San Zenone, San Carlo, San Liberatore, Titurano, Torreorsina

Government
  - Mayor: Stefano Bandecchi

Area
  - Total: 212.43 km^{2} (82.02 sq mi)
- Elevation: 130 m (430 ft)

Population (2026)
  - Total: 106,272
  - Density: 500.27/km^{2} (1,295.7/sq mi)
- Demonym: Ternani
- Time zone: UTC+1 (CET)
  - Summer (DST): UTC+2 (CEST)
- Postal code: 05100
- Dialing code: 0744
- Patron saint: Saint Valentine
- Saint day: February 14
- Website: Official website

Terni (/ˈtɛərni/ TAIR-nee; Italian: [ˈtɛrni]; Latin: Interamna (Nahars)) is a city in the southern portion of the region of Umbria in central Italy. It is near the border with Lazio. The city is the capital of the province of Terni, located in the plain of the River Nera. It is 104 kilometres (65 miles) northeast of Rome and 81 kilometres (50 mi) south of the regional capital, Perugia. With a population of 106,272, it is the 42nd-largest city in Italy.

The Latin name means "between-two-rivers", in reference to its location on the confluence of the Nera river (Ancient Umbrian Nahar, Latin: Nār, Nahar) and the Serra stream. When disambiguation was needed, it was referred to as Interamna Nahars. Its inhabitants were known in Latin as Interamnātēs Na(ha)rtēs.

Interamna was founded as an Ancient Roman town, although there were earlier settlements in the Terni area. During the 19th century, steel mills were introduced and led the city to have a role in the Second Industrial Revolution in Italy. Because of its industrial importance, the city was heavily bombed during World War II by the Allies. It remains an industrial hub and has been nicknamed "The Steel City".

Terni is also known as the "City of Lovers", as its patron saint, Saint Valentine, was born and became a bishop here, and his remains are preserved in the basilica-sanctuary.

== History ==
The city was founded around the 7th century BC by the Umbrians Nahartes, in a territory inhabited (as testified by archaeological excavations) as early as the Bronze Age. The Iguvine Tablets describe these Nahartes as a strong, numerous people and as the most important enemy of the Umbrian people of Gubbio (Iguvium). In the 3rd century BC, Terni was conquered by the Romans and soon became an important municipium lying on the Via Flaminia and known under the name Interamna, meaning "between-two-rivers".

In 271 BC the Roman consul Manius Curius Dentatus ordered the construction of a canal (the Curiano Trench) to divert the water from the marshes in the Rieti Valley and from Lake Velino over the natural cliff at Marmore, creating the waterfall. This caused flooding in the valley around Terni below. For a long time this became the cause of interminable quarrels between the cities of Rieti and Terni. The issue was so contentious between the two cities that the Roman Senate was forced to address it in 54 BC. Aulus Pompeius represented Terni, and Cicero represented Rieti. The Senate did nothing about the problem, and the problem remained the same for centuries.

After the Lombard conquest in 755, Terni lost prominence when it was reduced to a secondary town in the Duchy of Spoleto. In 1174, it was sacked by Frederick Barbarossa's general, Archbishop Christian of Mainz. In the following century, Terni was one of the sites visited frequently by St. Francis to give sermons.

In the 14th century Terni issued its own constitution, and from 1353 the walls were enlarged, and new channels were opened. As with many of the Italian communes of the Late Middle Ages, it was beset by civil unrest between the partisans of the Guelphs and Ghibellines, and later between the Nobili and Banderari (Terni's bourgeoisie). It later joined the Papal States. In 1580, an ironwork, the Ferriera, was introduced to work the iron ore mined in Monteleone di Spoleto, starting the traditional industrial connotation of the city. In the 17th century, however, the population of Terni declined further due to plagues and famines.

In the 19th century, Terni took advantage of the Industrial Revolution and of plentiful water sources in the area. New industries included a steelworks, a foundry, as well as weapons, jute and wool factories. In 1927, Terni became capital of the province.

The presence of important industries made the city a favorite target for the Allied bombardments in World War II. On August 11, 1943, a raid by 44 USAAF bombers, which dropped 213 tons of bombs, devastated the city, killing 564 people. It was the first of the 57 airstrikes that destroyed or damaged 40% of Terni's buildings and killed 1,018 civilians. Despite this, industrial environment increased quickly after the war.

== Climate ==
Climate data for Terni (1981–2010)
Month	Jan	Feb	Mar	Apr	May	Jun	Jul	Aug	Sep	Oct	Nov	Dec	Year
Mean daily maximum °C (°F)	11.4 (52.5)	13.1 (55.6)	16.7 (62.1)	19.9 (67.8)	25.3 (77.5)	29.7 (85.5)	33.4 (92.1)	33.2 (91.8)	28.1 (82.6)	22.8 (73.0)	16.0 (60.8)	12.0 (53.6)	21.8 (71.2)
Daily mean °C (°F)	6.9 (44.4)	8.1 (46.6)	11.2 (52.2)	14.3 (57.7)	19.2 (66.6)	23.3 (73.9)	26.4 (79.5)	26.4 (79.5)	22.1 (71.8)	17.5 (63.5)	11.6 (52.9)	8.0 (46.4)	16.3 (61.2)
Mean daily minimum °C (°F)	2.5 (36.5)	3.1 (37.6)	5.8 (42.4)	8.8 (47.8)	13.1 (55.6)	16.8 (62.2)	19.5 (67.1)	19.5 (67.1)	16.1 (61.0)	12.3 (54.1)	7.2 (45.0)	4.0 (39.2)	10.7 (51.3)
Average precipitation mm (inches)	56 (2.2)	64 (2.5)	59 (2.3)	87 (3.4)	74 (2.9)	59 (2.3)	31 (1.2)	52 (2.0)	91 (3.6)	95 (3.7)	116 (4.6)	82 (3.2)	866 (33.9)
Source: Istituto Superiore per la Protezione e la Ricerca Ambientale (precipitation 1971–2000)

== Demographics ==
Historical population
Year	Pop.	±%
1861	20,956	—
1871	22,780	+8.7%
1881	23,976	+5.3%
1901	41,543	+73.3%
1911	45,941	+10.6%
1921	50,811	+10.6%
1931	57,356	+12.9%
1936	64,513	+12.5%
1951	84,403	+30.8%
1961	95,072	+12.6%
1971	106,927	+12.5%
1981	111,564	+4.3%
1991	108,248	−3.0%
2001	105,018	−3.0%
2011	109,193	+4.0%
2021	107,165	−1.9%
Source: ISTAT

As of 2026, the population is 106,272, of which 48.1% are male, and 51.9% are female. Minors make up 12.9% of the population, and seniors make up 28.2%.

=== Immigration ===
As of 2025, immigrants make up 15.3% of the population. The 5 largest foreign countries of birth are Romania, Albania, Ukraine, India, and the Philippines.

== Sights ==
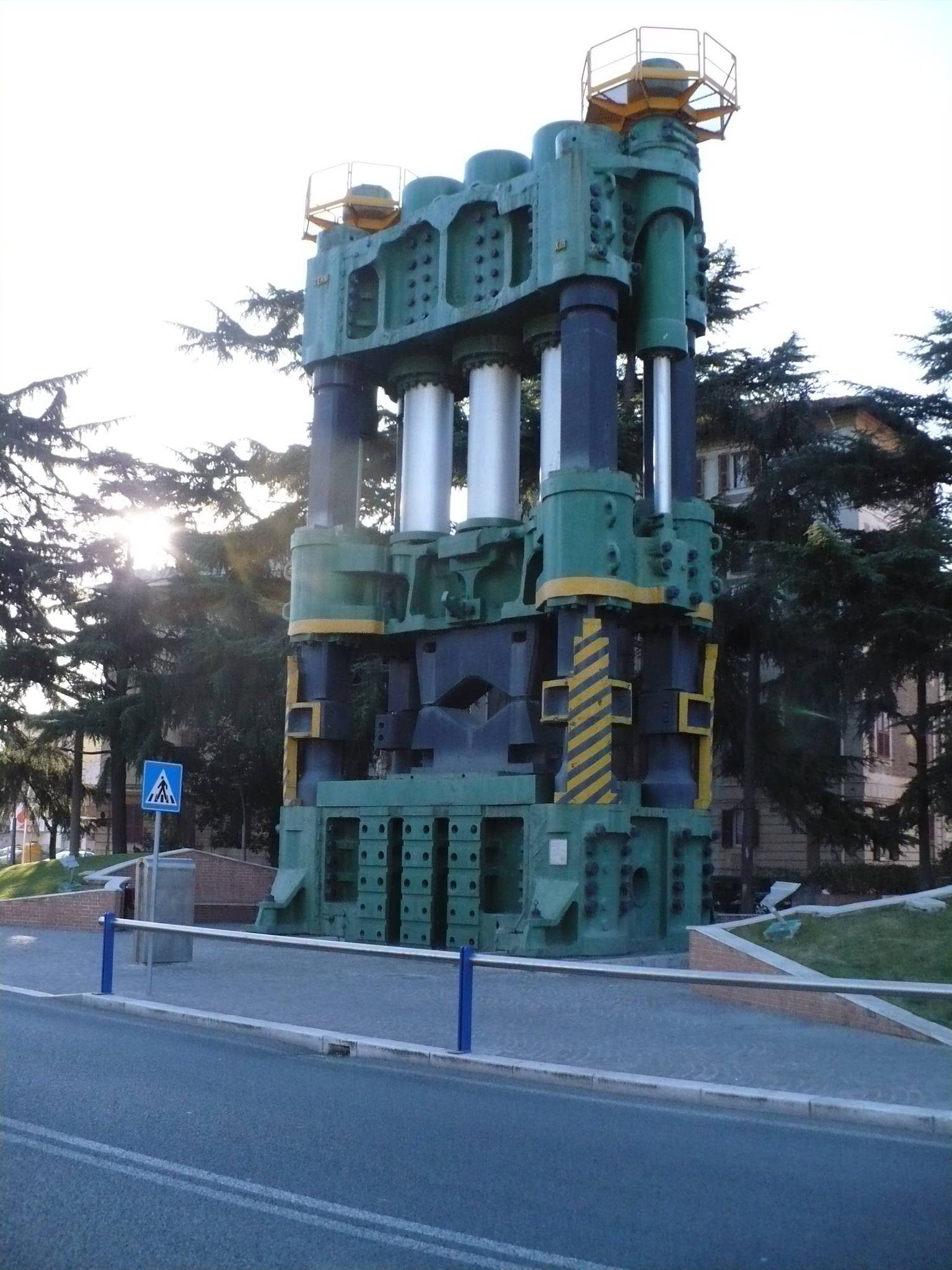
12,000 ton press

=== Religious architecture or sites ===
- Terni Cathedral (Duomo, Cattedrale di Santa Maria Assunta) (17th century). Built over one of the most ancient Christian edifices of the city, it has today Baroque lines. In the interior is one organ designed by Gian Lorenzo Bernini. The belfry is from the 18th century. The façade has two mediaeval gates: one of them has the profile of a sabot once used to measure the citizen's shoes in order to ensure that they did not exceed a fixed limit of decency.
- San Cristoforo: 12th-century church
- San Francesco: 13th-century church
- San Valentino: Basilica church
- Sant'Alò: (11th century) Romanesque church
- San Martino: Romanesque church
- San Salvatore: Romanesque church

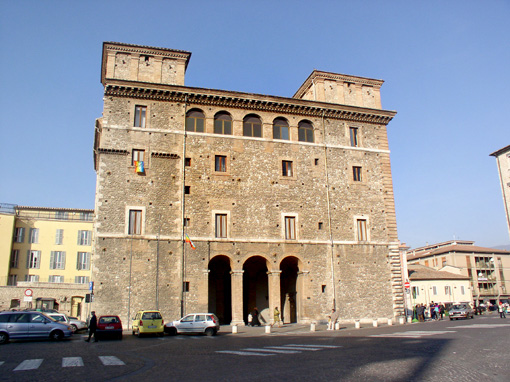
Palazzo Spada

=== Secular and civic architecture or sites ===
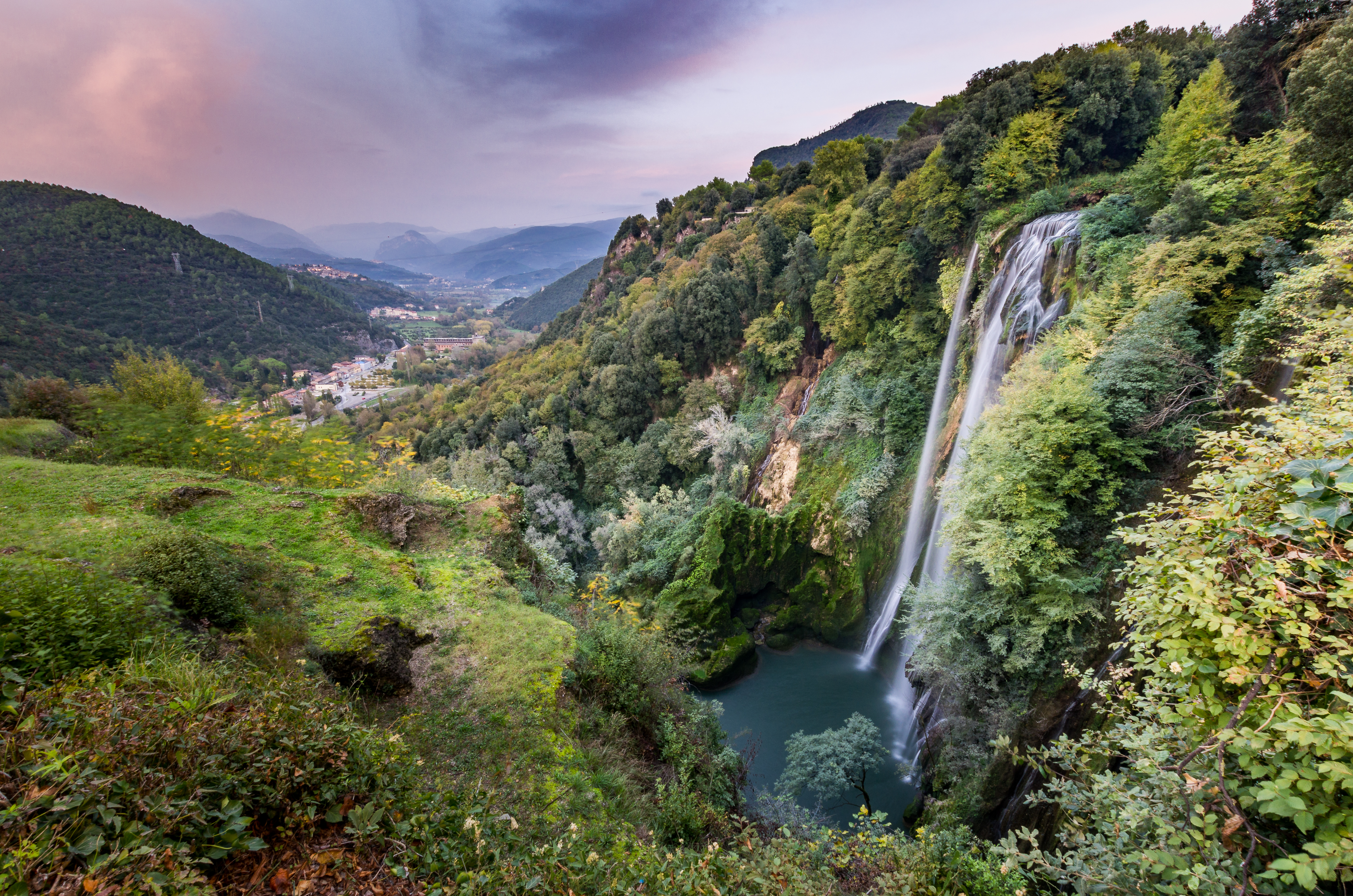
Cascata delle Marmore

- A Roman amphitheater, once capable of 10,000 spectators, built in 32 BC.
- Porta Sant'Angelo, one of the four Ancient Roman Gates to the city, much restored.
- Palazzo Mazzancolli is one of the few remains of the Middle Ages past of the city.
- Palazzo Gazzoli (18th century), housing the city's Gallery with works by Pierfrancesco d'Amelia, Benozzo Gozzoli, Girolamo Troppa and Orneore Metelli.
- Palazzo Spada (16th century), designed by Antonio da Sangallo the Younger. It is the current Town Hall.
- Santa Maria del Carmine, Terni: deconsecrated church
- Lancia di Luce ("Lance of Light"), by the sculptor Arnaldo Pomodoro.
- Cascata delle Marmore: a 165-metre-high (541-foot) Roman-era waterfall nearby, at the confluence of the Velino and Nera Rivers; it is the tallest man-made waterfall in the world.
- Nuovo Villaggio Matteotti, designed by Giancarlo De Carlo from 1969 to 1974. The housing complex follows the New Brutalism design and it is known for the collaborative nature of its conception.

== Economy ==
The city has three important industrial hubs: the first one is the Stainless Steel Area, called AST (part of the group ThyssenKrupp) and is a wide area located in the east part of Terni. West of the town, there is a second industrial hub, known as "Area Polymer", with four different chemical multinational industries. The third industrial hub is Italeaf, which controls TerniEnergia, a company listed on STAR segment of Borsa Italiana, that is active in the renewable energy sector, and promotes and develops technological start-ups in the cleantech sector.

In the 1940s, heavy industry dominated. The Società Terni operated major steel works with eight open hearth and two electric furnaces and an annual capacity of 90,000 tons of special armament steels. The plant included presses, forges, rolling mills, and tube works. At the arsenal, the same concern produced machine guns, anti tank rifles, rifles, 75 mm and 149 mm field guns, naval guns up to 28 cm, and shells. The Royal Small Arms factory also produced small arms, and both concerns maintained shell filling plants.

The Società Terni also operated a calcium carbide plant at Papigno with an estimated annual capacity of 180,000 tons, although shortages of coal and power reduced output below capacity. Cyanamide production occurred with an annual capacity of 22,000 tons nitrogen. Liqueurs, spirits, and mineral waters were also produced. Two large textile mills operated, including the SA Jutificio di Terni with 600 workers and Il Fabbricone with 500 workers. Timber processing was significant, with many sawmills.

== Transport ==
Terni is connected with the A1 motorway, the European route E45 and National Road Flaminia by the RATO, a motorway junction.

Terni railway station is part of the Ancona–Orte railway, and is also a junction station for two secondary lines, the Terni–Sulmona railway (which links Terni with L'Aquila) and the Terni–Sansepolcro railway (FCU) (which serves Perugia). One of the most important national freight stations is located nearby. The local urban and suburban transport service, ATC, runs 90 bus lines. In the north of the city (Colleluna zone), there are works in progress on the line from Perugia to enable it to be used as a Light rail line.

Terni does not its own airport, the nearest airport to the city is Perugia San Francesco d'Assisi – Umbria International Airport which provides flights to other parts of Italy, the UK and Europe. The airport is located 84 km (52 mi) north of the city. However, residents in the city would normally use Rome Fiumicino Airport as it provides most domestic and international flights. The airport is located 134 km (83 mi) south west of Terni.

== Sport ==
Ternana Calcio is the main football club in the city. The club has twice played in Italy's first division Serie A (seasons 1972–1973 and 1974–1975). Ternana is currently playing in Serie C (season 2025–2026). The club plays at the 22,000-seat Stadio Libero Liberati, named after Italian motorcycle racer Libero Liberati, who was born in Terni, won the 500cc World Championship in 1957, and died while he was training with his Gilera Saturno along the Valnerina road near Terni.

== Notable people ==
=== Historical ===
- House of Castelli: first important family native of Terni of Germanic lineage. In the Middle Ages, Renaissance, Baroque and 18th century was an active family both in their city than in others.
- House of Spada: Central Italy's very important family, native of Terni. In middle age, Renaissance, Baroque and 18th century was an active family both in their city than in others.
- House of Camporeali: Terni's very important family. In the Middle Ages and Renaissance was an active family both in their city than in others.
- House of Cittadini: Central Italy's very important family, native of Terni, of Germanic lineage. In the Middle Ages and Renaissance was an active family both in their city than in others.
- House of Manassei: Central Italy's very important family, native of Terni, of Germanic lineage. In the Middle Ages and Renaissance was an active family both in their city than in others.
- House of Mazzancolli: Terni's very important family. In the Renaissance, Baroque and 18th century was an active family both in their city than in others.
- House of Tomassoni: Terni's very important family. In the Renaissance, Baroque and 18th century was an active family both in their city than in others.
- House of Ciancherotti: Terni's very important family. In the Renaissance, Baroque and 18th century was an active family both in their city than in others.
- House of Nicoletti: Terni's very important family. In the Middle Ages, Renaissance, Baroque and 18th century was an active family both in their city than in others.
- Andrea Castelli da Terni (14th-15th century): condottiere and hero of the city-state of Terni. He was also a podestà and a politician.
- Alessandro and Lucantonio Tomassoni da Terni (16th century): condottiere brothers
- Anastasio and Stefano Ciancherotti da Terni (16th-17th century): condottiere brothers
- Blessed brother Barnaba Manassei (15th century): his greater fame's title is to have set up the order of Monti di Pietà to remedy the disastrous wear that impoverished families and city-states.
- Aminale Lodovico: a militar and adventurer who fought with other twelve Italian knights in the Challenge of Barletta (1503) against the French
- Sir Cittadini (the Dragon Slayer): legendary hero of the city of Terni. He is the one who will free his city from the slavery of a dragon of the swamps.
- Saint Valentine, bishop and martyred saint
- Saints Berardo, Ottone, Pietro, Accursio and Adiuto, 13th century Franciscan protomartyrs

=== Notable ===
- Francesco Angeloni (1559–1652), historian, art collector and writer of Historia di Terni
- Baconin Borzacchini (1898–1933), Grand Prix motor racing driver
- Giulio Briccialdi (1818–1881), composer and flautist
- Alessandro Casagrande (1922–1964), composer and pianist
- Aurelio De Felice, sculptor
- Alessio Foconi, fencer
- Alvaro Leonardi (1895–1955), military aviator, highly decorated with the Silver Medal of Military Valor and with a War Merit Cross. Ace fighter, is credited with eight knockdowns during the First World War.
- Libero Liberati, 500 cc motorcycle racer, nicknamed "The Steel Knight" (Il Cavaliere d'Acciaio), 1957 500 cc Grand Prix World Champion
- Fabio Lucioni (born 1987), football player
- Alessandro Manni, retired football player
- Stefano Micheli, musician (My Mine)
- Elia Rossi Passavanti political and military, then mayor of the city of Terni, and local historian, one of only two Italians to be decorated with the Medal of Military Valor in both the First and Second World Wars
- Ettore Patrizi, publisher, L'Italia
- Danilo Petrucci, Moto GP racer
- Claudio Petruccioli, politician and journalist
- Oreste Scalzone, political activist, founder of Potere Operaio
- Davide Scaramuzza, professor
- Gaius Cornelius Tacitus, Roman historian
- Marcus Claudius Tacitus, Roman emperor
- Paolo Tagliavento, international football referee
- Sara Tommasi, actress
- Riccardo Zampagna, football player
- Lorela Cubaj, WNBA player

== International relations ==
=== Twin towns – sister cities ===
Terni is twinned with:

- Cartagena, Spain
- Dunaújváros, Hungary
- Saint-Ouen-sur-Seine, France

== See also ==
- History of Terni, Umbria
