= San Cristoforo, Terni =

San Cristoforo
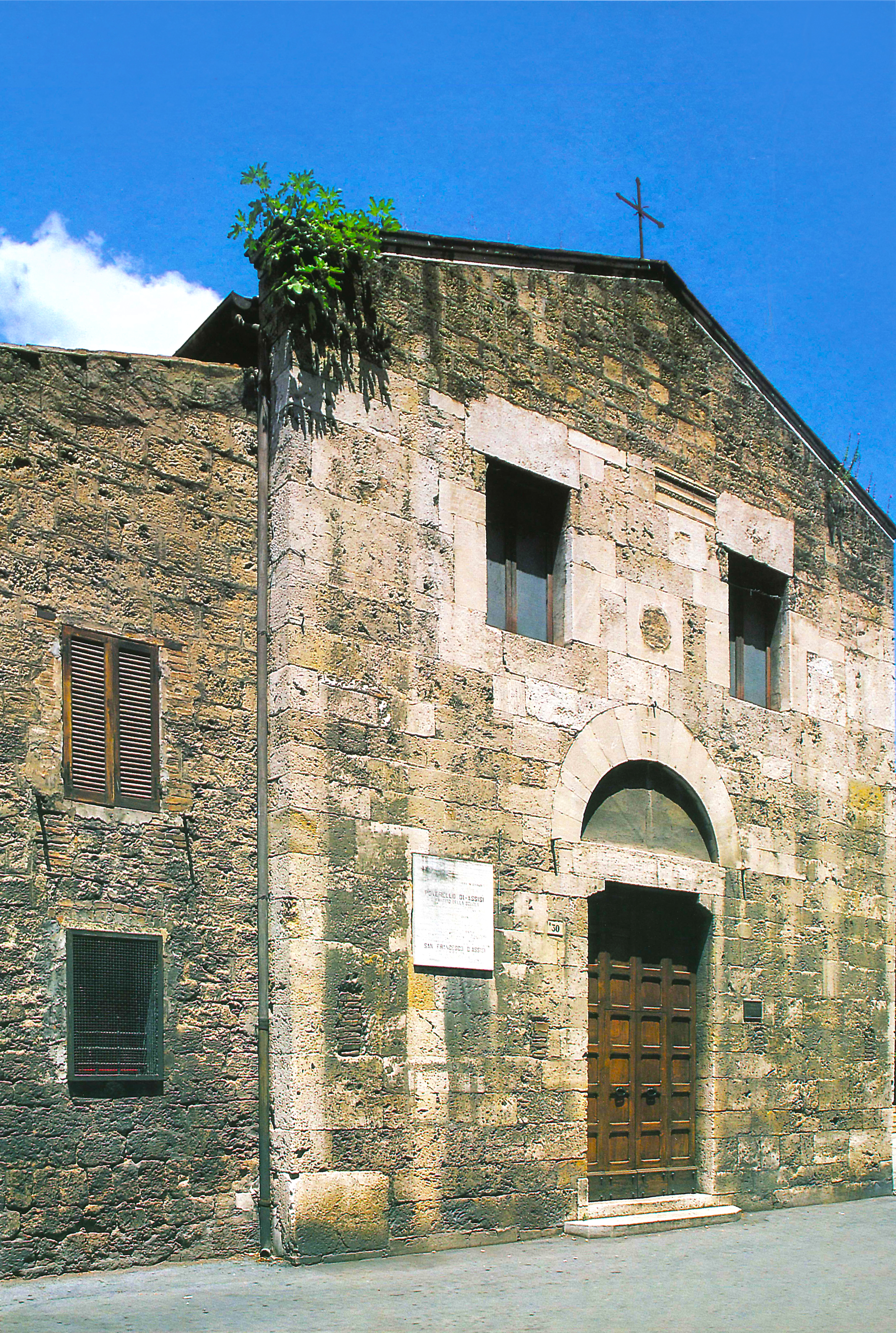

- 42.565062°N 12.649313°E
- Location: Terni, Province of Terni, Umbria
- Address: Via Francesco Angeloni, 24
- Country: Italy
- Denomination: Roman Catholic

History
- Founded: 12th century
- Dedication: Saint Christopher

Specifications
- Materials: stone bricks

Administration
- Diocese: Terni-Narni-Amelia

San Cristoforo is a 12th-century Roman Catholic church in Terni, region of Umbria, in Italy. Francis of Assisi is putatively said to have preached from atop a stone at the right flank of the church, now housing a bronze sculpture of the saint. It is in the Diocese of Terni-Narni-Amelia.

== History ==
The small simple church is made from stone bricks, likely spolia, and has a single nave with fragments remaining of 14th and 15th century frescoes. There is also a triptych with St Christopher, while a 17th-century canvas depicting the church's patron in housed in the adjacent modern church building.
