= Palazzo Spada (Terni) =

Coordinates: 42.560574°N 12.647091°E

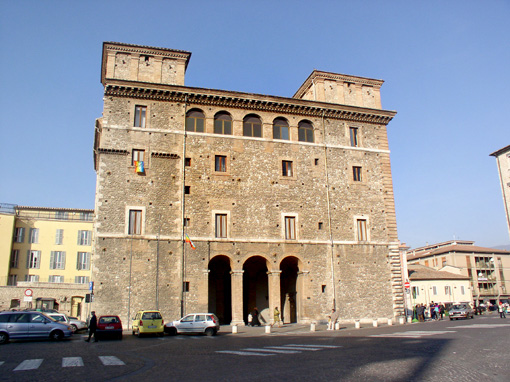
Palazzo Spada

Palazzo Spada is a palace in Terni, Umbria, central Italy, built on behest of Count Michelangelo Spada in the mid-16th century and designed by Antonio da Sangallo the Younger. It currently serves as the town hall for the city. Alexandre de Rogissart wrote about the palace in the eighteenth century, remarking the beauty of its structure.

The inner lounges are decorated with cinquecento frescoes, which were supplemented with newer decorations in the 18th century. The palace passed to the Massarucci family in the 19th century and subsequently was given to the Sisters of the Infant Jesus. After being handed over to the municipal administration of Terni, it was restored to render it fit for its new role as the city's town hall.

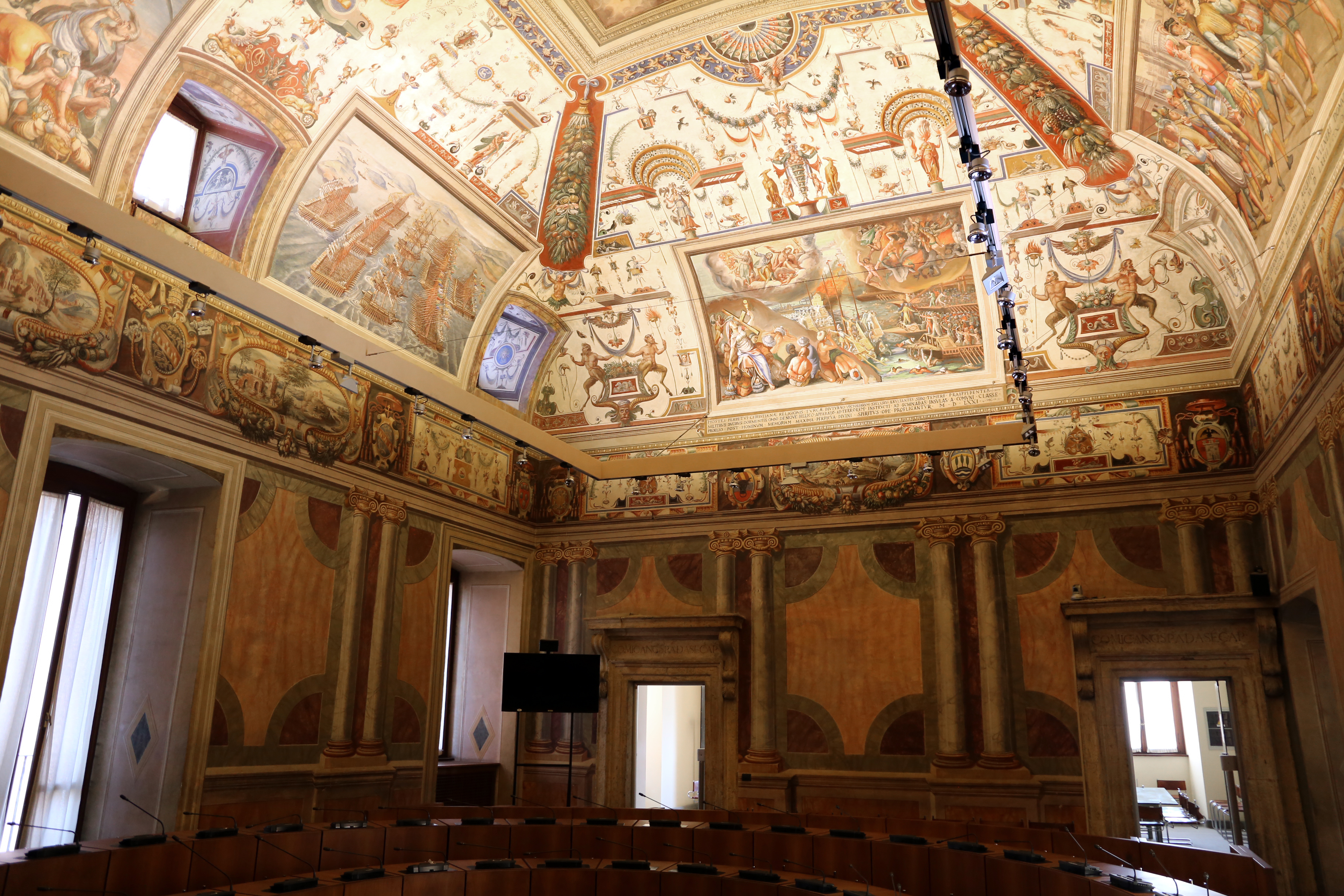
The Sala di Fetonte, with scenes of the Fall of Phaethon, Battle of Lepanto, and St. Bartholomew's Massacre, by Karel van Mander and others, 1574-77

The main floor rooms are decorated with frescoes dating from the second half of the sixteenth to the nineteenth centuries. Central to the ceiling of the main hall, which is currently used as the seat of the city council, is a representation of Phaëton punished by Jupiter; at the sides are depicted, in six panels, scenes from the Battle of Lepanto and the Massacre of the Huguenots. The frescoes in the main lounge, which are painted in a late-Mannerist style, are traditionally attributed to Karel van Mander.

Beneath the vault are landscapes, alternating with coats of arms of popes and bishops, prominent among them the one of Pope Julius III, who made Michelangelo Spada a count.
