= Saint Susanna (Duquesnoy) =

Sculpture by François Duquesnoy

Coordinates: 41°53′46″N 12°29′03″E

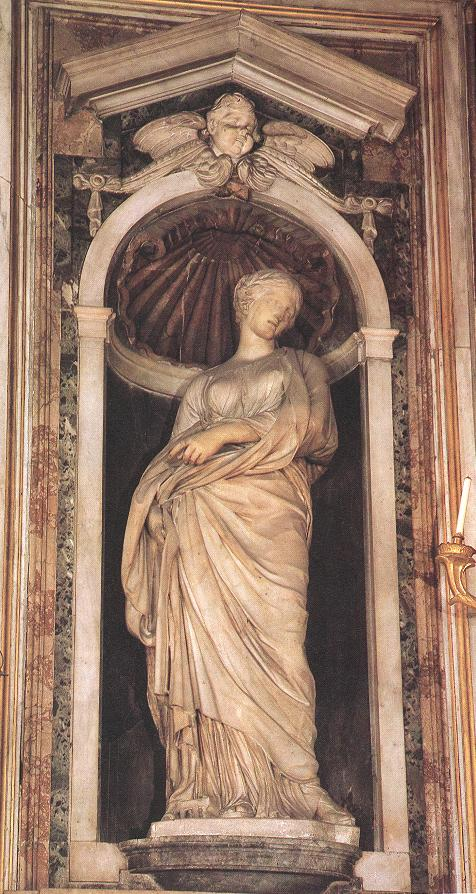
- Artist: François Duquesnoy
- Year: 1629–1633
- Type: Sculpture
- Medium: Marble
- Subject: Saint Susanna
- Location: Santa Maria di Loreto; Rome

The Saint Susanna is a marble sculpture by François Duquesnoy. The work is one of four sculptures of Roman virgin martyrs commissioned by the Bakers' Guild to decorate the church of Santa Maria di Loreto in Rome. It was completed in the course of four years from 1629 to 1633. Giovanni Pietro Bellori, comparing Duquesnoy's achievement with the Saint Susanna to that of Polyclitus with his Doryphoros and its Kanon, commented [Duquesnoy has] left to modern sculptors the example for statues of clothed figures, making him more than the equal of the best ancient sculptor. The statue is considered by modern scholars an exemplification of Duquesnoy's 'Greek ideal,' which included an approach to drapery unpopular at the time, established through the study of antique models selected by Duquesnoy.

Duquesnoy's maniera greca would later influence Johann Joachim Winckelmann, and through him the Neoclassicism movement. Jacob Burckhardt regarded the sculpture as "the best statue of the 17th century." With its clinging drapery juxtaposed to her modest gaze and clothing, Duquesnoy's Santa Susanna was considered by contemporaries an "admixture of eroticism and modesty." The figure follows the concept whereby "the drapery should not be so thick as to make it appear like stone, but must be arranged around the body in folds, so that the nude underneath is sometimes discernible but sometimes artfully concealed without any hardness which can obscure the members of the figure." Such approach was at odds with the spectrum of contemporary sculpture, specifically Bernini's expressive use of heavy, billowing drapery. Duquesnoy's St. Susanna doesn't look upwards to heaven, but down at humanity, with her hand pointing down to the altar. This, too, was at odds with Bernini's exuberance and mystification of naturalness and humanity.

The Santa Susanna made a powerful impression on contemporary artists and critics, provoking "admiration as well as critical debate over its style and relation to the antique." However, the sculpture did not become widely recognized outside Rome until 18th century. In the early 18th century, Domenico de Rossi's engraving of the statue helped to initially increase its celebrity, which was consolidated internationally when a copy by Coustou was completed and sent to the Paris' academy at the Louvre in 1739.

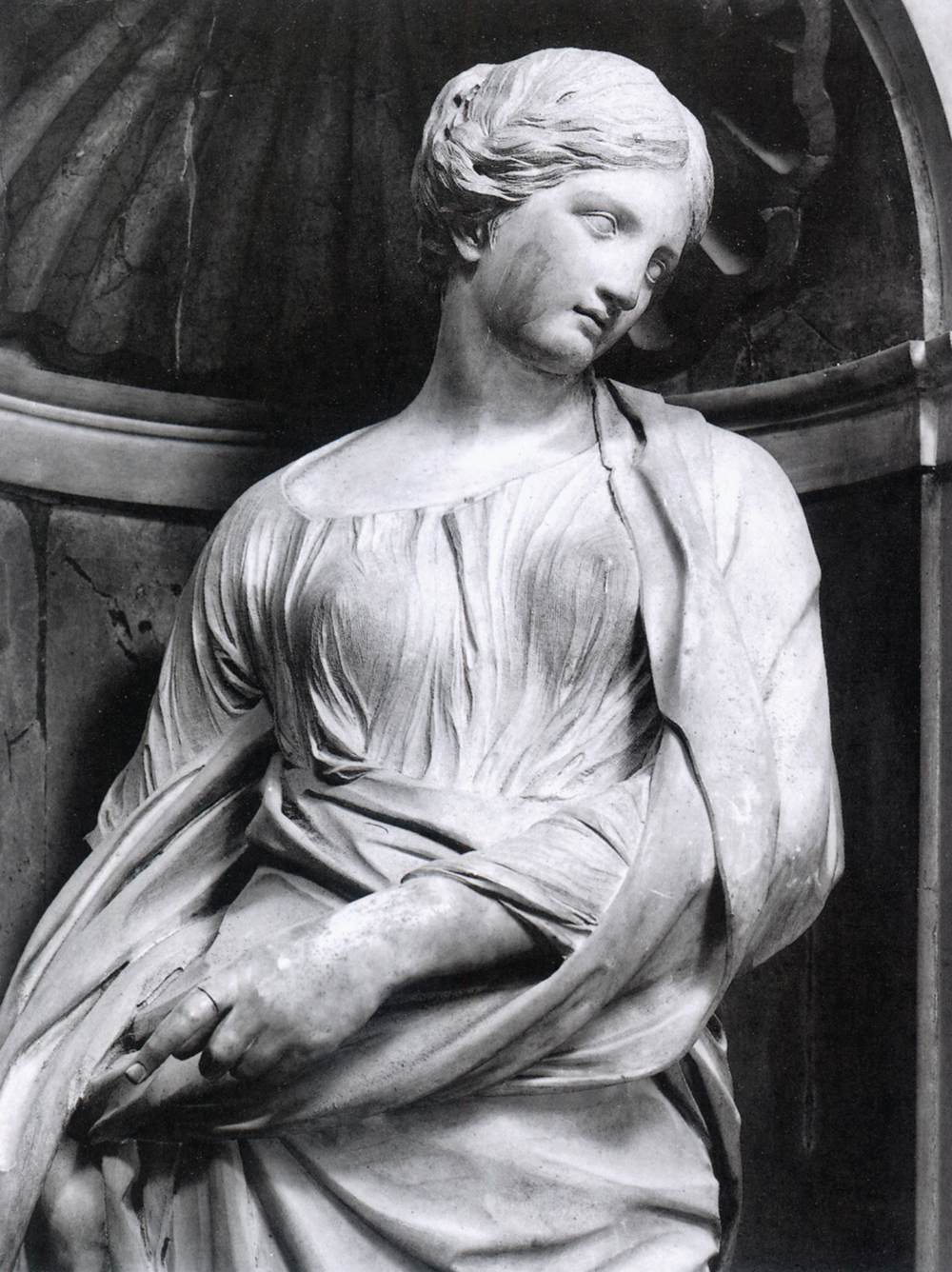
Detail of the sculpture

== Background ==
The Saint Susanna was commissioned together with four other sculptures of Roman virgins by the confraternity of the Roman Baker's Guild, to decorate the newly extended choir of their church of Santa Maria di Loreto, located close by the Forum of Trajan. While the disposition of the four statues within the church has been altered in the years, the choir was conserved virtually intact. In 1628, four artists were engaged to carry out the church's planned decoration, but neither was Duquesnoy engaged at this time, nor was Saint Susanna thought to be among the Roman virgins' statues to be produced and installed in the church's choir. After Maderno and de Rossi (two of the four original sculptors engaged by the Bakers) quickly carried out the first of the two statues they were initially supposed to produce for the Bakers, instead of commissioning a second statue from them, as implied in their contract, Duquesnoy and Giuliano Finelli, two of the most promising young sculptors in Rome, were engaged. The sculptors were to be paid 150 scudi each.

The Roman Saint Susanna, like the other saints in San Maria di Loreto a symbol of Christian chastity and beauty, was probably chosen as an emblem of faith and virtue through which inspire the young unmarried Roman women assisted by the confraternity, whose work of charity included the annual provision of dowries to enable daughters of poor bakers to marry or to enter convent.

== Production ==
There is debate over whether Duquesnoy secured the St. Susanna's commission as a result of the critical success of his St. Andrew or the other way around. In the 17th century, it was generally believed that the success of the former (St. Susanna) secured Duquesnoy his commission for the St. Andrew. The opinion of the early biographers has given rise to a continuing discussion over the sculptures' chronology. Mariette Fransolet, like the early biographers, believed that Pope Urban VIII himself sought a design from Duquesnoy, later approving the Fleming's model at the Congregazione della Fabbrica of Saint Peter's meeting in May 1628. She placed the completion and exhibition of a definitive model of the St. Susanna at sometime in early 1627. However, there is no documented involvement of the sculptor with the St. Susanna prior to the end of 1629.

Although early biographers and other 20th century scholars such as Mariette Fransolet believed that the critical success of the St. Susanna preceded that of the St. Andrew, modern scholars tend to discredit this assertion. Based on documentary record, Duquesnoy received the commission for the St. Susanna in mid-December 1629, months after he had received his first payment for his work on the St. Andrews. The cardinal protector of the confraternity of the Baker's guild was Cardinal Biscia, a bibliophile and patron of the arts who served also in the Congregazione della Fabbrica of St. Peter, which commissioned Duquesnoy's St. Andrew and the other three colossuses in St. Peter. It is possible that Biscia recommended Duquesnoy to the Bakers after assisting at the unveiling of the St. Andrew's model in St. Peter on December 10, 1629.

Duquesnoy took delivery of the marble for the St. Susanna on January 31, 1630. Like Finelli, he took more time to execute his statue than Ferrucci, Moderno and de Rossi. It was as late as March 6, 1631 that Duquesnoy received his first fifty scudi for his work on the Santa Susanna. Duquesnoy received his second payment the following August, and the statue was installed in the choir over a year and a half later, on March 29, 1633. The final payment of fifty scudi to Duquesnoy was issued in May 1633. However, the last payment order was subsequently cancelled, and Duquesnoy's final payment for the St. Susanna was not reissued until January 11, 1635. Meanwhile, Duquesnoy petitioned the confraternity for reimbursement for additional expenses, and was indeed reimbursed by August 1633. The reason for the confraternity's delay in paying Duquesnoy his final fifty scudi is unclear.

In the 1630s, Duquesnoy suffered of gout, attacks of vertigo and depression, which would debilitate him until his death in 1643. His poor health affected his productivity, which drastically decreased at that time. This may well account for the delays in both the completion of the St. Susanna and Duquesnoy's final payment, with the church withholding the latter until all details were set on the already installed statue. Bellori reports that while installing the St. Susanna's metal palm, Duquesnoy had an attack of vertigo, fell from the ladder and almost lost his life.

== Style and composition ==
Both Bellori and Passeri emphasized the sculpture's relation to the antique. According to Bellori and Passeri, the sculpture proposes a "calibrated tension between eroticism and modesty," which is "played out in the sculpture in the shifting relationship between the body and the drapery." Passeri commented:

The form of her dress is a religious imitation of the most beautiful ancient statues as far as the use of draperies, which, although covering, reveal openly the entire nude, but not in a free and licentious manner, and, while [the drapery] allows the form of the breasts to be distinguished, they remain covered in a way that indicates perfect modesty

The torso of Duquesnoy's St. Susanna is covered with continuous vertical marks made with the claw of the chisel, reproducing the loose waves of the fabric while also outlining the torso. The mantle plays a role in outlining the body as well; running in long diagonal folds across the body, and drawn close to the saint's side, it culminates in a "cascade parallel to the weight bearing leg," with its softly carved, horizontal lines delineating the volume of the relaxed leg. She minimally lifts her left hand from beneath her mantle, pointing to the altar. St. Susanna wears a thin tunic that clings to her chest in thin vertical folds, accentuating the figure's round breasts. The statue was sculpted in accordance with Duquesnoy's own conception of great ancient sculptures' characteristics; however, the statue is extremely naturalistic. This aspect was not present in many ancient Roman sculptures. Duquesnoy gave the figure its naturalistic aspect through painstaking carving. He did so according to his consideration of it as a fundamental aspect of his imaginary Greek ideal. Santa Susanna was portrayed with soft cheeks, a tender expression, and a retiring and averted gaze, which further underscores her modesty. The arrangement of her hair, with its "graceful waves parted and gathered at the back of the head without the adornment of escaping curls" is reminiscent of the typical ancient depiction of the virgin goddesses Diana and Artemis, which Duquesnoy used as prototypes for his virgin martyr. Although critics have seen the fullness of her cheeks as a departure from the antique and a 17th century's idiosyncrasy, this, too, was typical of Artemis' profile representation on Roman coins. In spite of the restrained coiffure of St. Susanna and her full cheeks, her face was modeled by Duquesnoy upon the features of Venus, the goddess of beauty and eroticism. This is evinced in her heart-shaped face, dimpled chin and slightly open mouth; the elongated nose and her wide-set, almond shaped eyes. The arrangement of her hair in a modest chignon produces "the same fateful tension embodied in the simultaneously modest and revealing drapery." Through her physiognomy, too, Duquesnoy was therefore able to create an original composition that successfully expressed the beauty, erotic appeal and chastity of the virgin martyr.

Duquesnoy, as expressed in his maniera greca theory, believed that the best ancient draped statues were those that "remained closest to the purity of the Greek nude through the use of thin, body-revealing drapery." As recorded by Duquesnoy's pupil Boselli, "[The ancients] did not have another aim, nor other end, or intention, than to dress the nude while showing it, to cover it by displaying it" and "one must drape with suitable and lovely folds... the antique made draped figures as if they were nude."

Although Duquesnoy drew inspiration from Greek sculpture, his was still an imaginative vision based on his own perception of the latter's characteristics. Although the opus has been tentatively compared to other sculptures present in Rome by contemporaries, he in fact produced a completely new and quite original aesthetic object, based on his own perception, wherein traits of both valuable Roman sculpture and ancient Greek ones were combined. Duquesnoy "went well beyond simple imitation to recombine and transform his sources in accordance with his understanding of the verisimilitude, emotive power, and material refinement of ancient Greek art."

== Critical reception and influence ==
Despite the St. Susanna's considerable impact on the art world in contemporary Rome, the statue was little known outside the eternal city. Rubens, in writing to Duquesnoy to thank him for the casts of the Van den Eynde's putti the Fiammingo had sent to him, did indeed compliment him for the beauty of the Eynde's putti, and he did refer to the fame of Duquesnoy's St. Andrew, but he did not mention the St. Susanna at all. It was not until the 18th century that the Saint Susanna was discovered by a broader international audience. In the 17th century, copies of the statue were very rare, even within Rome. In 1736, however, Nicolas Wleughels, excited by the statue's beauty and the prospect of sending a copy of it to France, where the statue was "certainly unknown", decided to ask the Baker's Guild to remove the statue from its niche, in order to make copies of it. A copy in marble by Guillaume Coustou was completed and sent to Paris in 1739, where it was installed in the Hall of Antiquities of the Royal Academy of Painting and Sculpture at the Louvre. This gave the statue first international recognition, precipitating a surge of interest for the latter, which over the next decades was included in the canon of exemplary sculptures in virtually all major art academies in Europe.

During a casting of the statue ordered by Venetian collector Filippo Farsetti, with the copy intended to be placed in his study museum in Venice (whose casts would be studied by young Antonio Canova), to the dismay of the confraternity, the forefinger of the saint's left hand was broken, and the face discolored. In the late 17th century, the statue continued to be much admired, with its popularity now probably at its apex. In 1763, Spanish sculptor Isidoro Carnicero made a reduced-scale copy of it, which is still preserved in the Real Academia de Bellas Artes de San Fernando. A few years later, Flemish sculptor Pierre-François Le Roy paid homage to the St. Susanna in his Saint Catherine, which he produced for the Royal Chateau of Laeken in Brussels.

Due to the growing popularity of the Saint Susanna and the damage it suffered during its unfortunate 1753 casting by Farsetti, the confraternity decided to move the statue to the altar of the Chapel of the Magi, where it was accessible to the public, who flocked there to venerate it. The church cited the statue's removal and the damage done by Farsetti as the reasons for their denial of further casting of the statue. In 1781, the church denied Francesco Righetti's request for the execution of a cast from the statue. Righetti had been commissioned by Boston-native art collector and banker Henry Hope to cast twelve lead-copies of the most prominent sculptures in Rome, which were to be installed in his Neoclassical Villa Welgelegen in Haarlem. He mostly selected famous antique sculptures, but he specifically required Duquesnoy's Saint Susanna. Being denied permission, Righetti was forced to settle for a cast of Saint Susanna's copy at the French Academy in Rome.

According to his scholar Estelle Lingo, this opus was the manifesto of Duquesnoy's gran maniera greca, an imaginative vision based on his own perception of ancient Greek sculpture, in which the latter was associated with slenderness, subtle contours, nudity or, among clothed statues, body-disclosing drapery. Winckelmann, writing under the influence of Duquesnoy's concepts a hundred years later, added: "and a noble simplicity and quiet grandeur, both in posture and expression." This is discernible in the St. Susanna's modestly averted gaze stemming from godlike features. Winckelmann, an admirer of Duquesnoy circle's maniera greca, drew his Neoclassical ideas from Sandrart, who was indeed a member of Duquesnoy's circle. Duquesnoy's ideas had therefore an indirect influence on the birth of the Neoclassicism movement; the Saint Susanna was "Duquesnoy's exemplification of his theory," and the sculpture was "clearly viewed as such by his contemporaries." Duquesnoy's Saint Susanna is today duly acknowledged as one of the most significant sculptures of 17th century's Rome, with frequent citations stressing it importance in the historical literature of art and sculpture.

== Sources ==
- Fransolet, Mariette (1942). Francois du Quesnoy, sculpteur d'Urbain VIII, 1597–1643. Bruxelles, Belgium: Academie Royale de Belgique.
- Lingo, Estelle (2002). "The Greek Manner and a Christian 'Canon': François Duquesnoy's 'Saint Susanna'". The Art Bulletin. 84 (1): 65–93. doi:10.2307/3177253. JSTOR 3177253.
- Lingo, Estelle Cecile (2007). François Duquesnoy and the Greek Ideal. New Haven, Connecticut: Yale University Press. ISBN 9780300124835.
- Boudon-Machuel, Marion (2005). François Du Quesnoy. Paris: Arthena.
- Bellori, Gian Pietro (1672). The Lives of the Artists. Moscardi, Rome.
- Passeri, Giovanni Battista (1772). Vite de pittori, scultori ed architetti che anno lavorato in Roma, morti dal 1641 fino al 1673. Settari, Rome.
- "St Susanna". Web Gallery of Art.
- Boselli, Orfeo (1978). Osservazioni della scoltura antica. Edizioni S.P.E.S.
- "St Susanna". Web Gallery of Art.
