= Christ Bound =

Ivory sculpture by François Duquesnoy

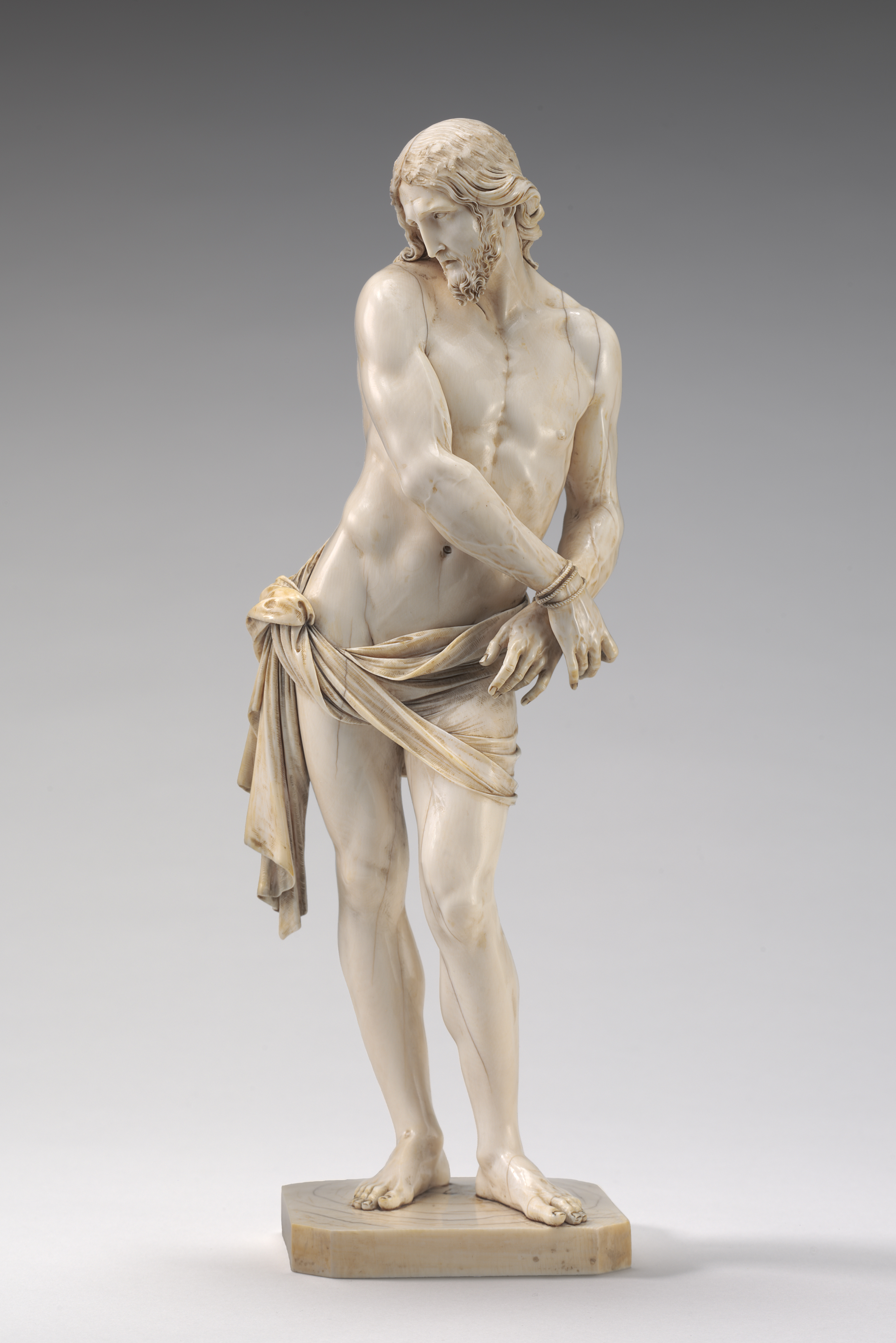
- Artist: François Duquesnoy
- Year: 1620s
- Type: Sculpture
- Medium: Ivory
- Subject: Christ
- Dimensions: 32.8 cm (12 7/8 in)
- Location: National Gallery of Art, Washington, D.C.; 38.89147°N 77.02001°W

Christ Bound is an ivory sculpture by Flemish sculptor François Duquesnoy, executed in the 1620s. It is now in the National Gallery of Art in Washington, D.C., which acquired it in June 2007.

== Background ==
The sculpture was produced in the early part of Duquesnoy's career in Rome. The Fiammingo was sent to study in Italy by his patron Archduke Albert. He settled in Rome in 1618.

After the death of his benefactor the archduke (1621), Duquesnoy was forced to carve works in ivory and wood to support himself.

In the 1620s, Duquesnoy produced an ivory crucifix as a gift to the pope.

It is likely that Duquesnoy produced the Christ Bound at this time.

== Sculpture ==
The sculpture depicts Christ with his eyes downcast and his body elegantly bent into a precarious and yet balanced pose. The curve of his body might be following the curve of the single piece of tusk from whence this figure was cut. This sculpture is early evidence of Duquesnoy's aesthetic vision, his maniera greca. Similarly to Duquesnoy's Saint Andrew and its Laocoön-like torso, the Christ is here depicted in a way which is reminiscent of ancient Greek sculpture. The Christ Bound's proportioned, slim and toned body is a fundamental aspect in Duquesnoy's own vision of valuable Ancient Roman and Greek sculpture.

The sculpture is in the National Gallery of Art in Washington, D.C., where it is located on the ground floor of the West Building, in Gallery 10.

== Gallery ==
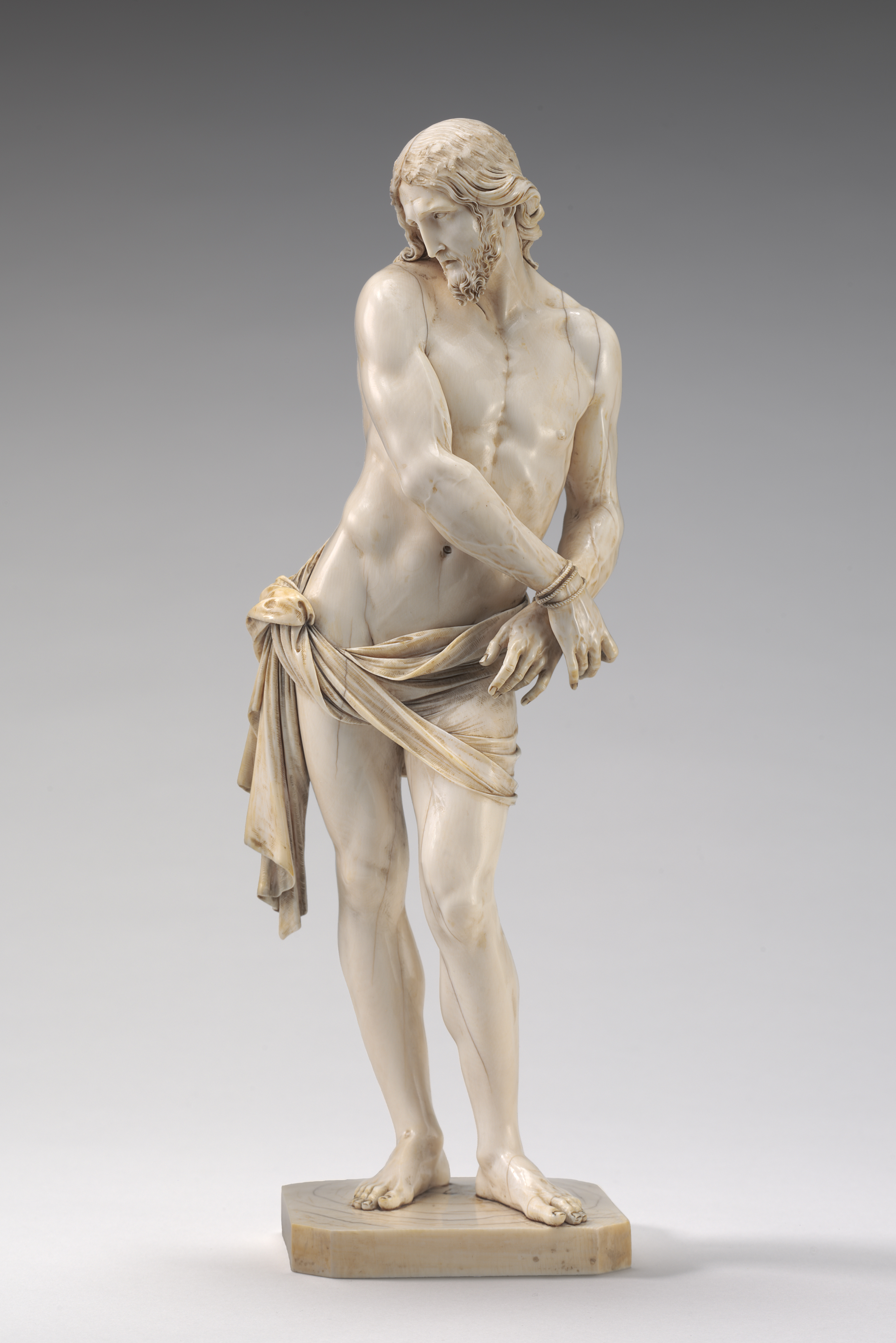

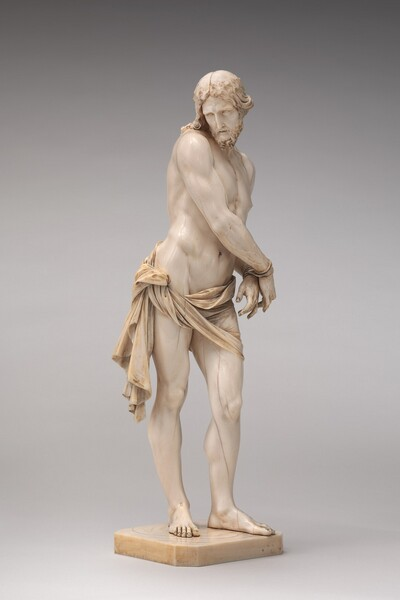

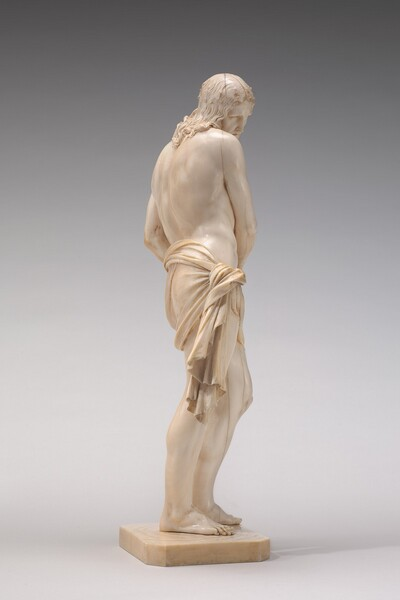

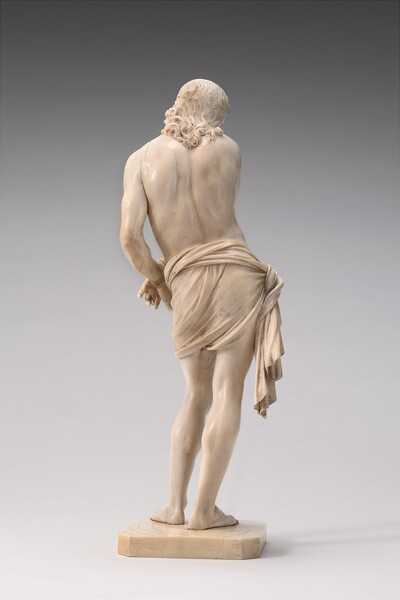
