= Rondanini Faun =

Statue by François Duquesnoy

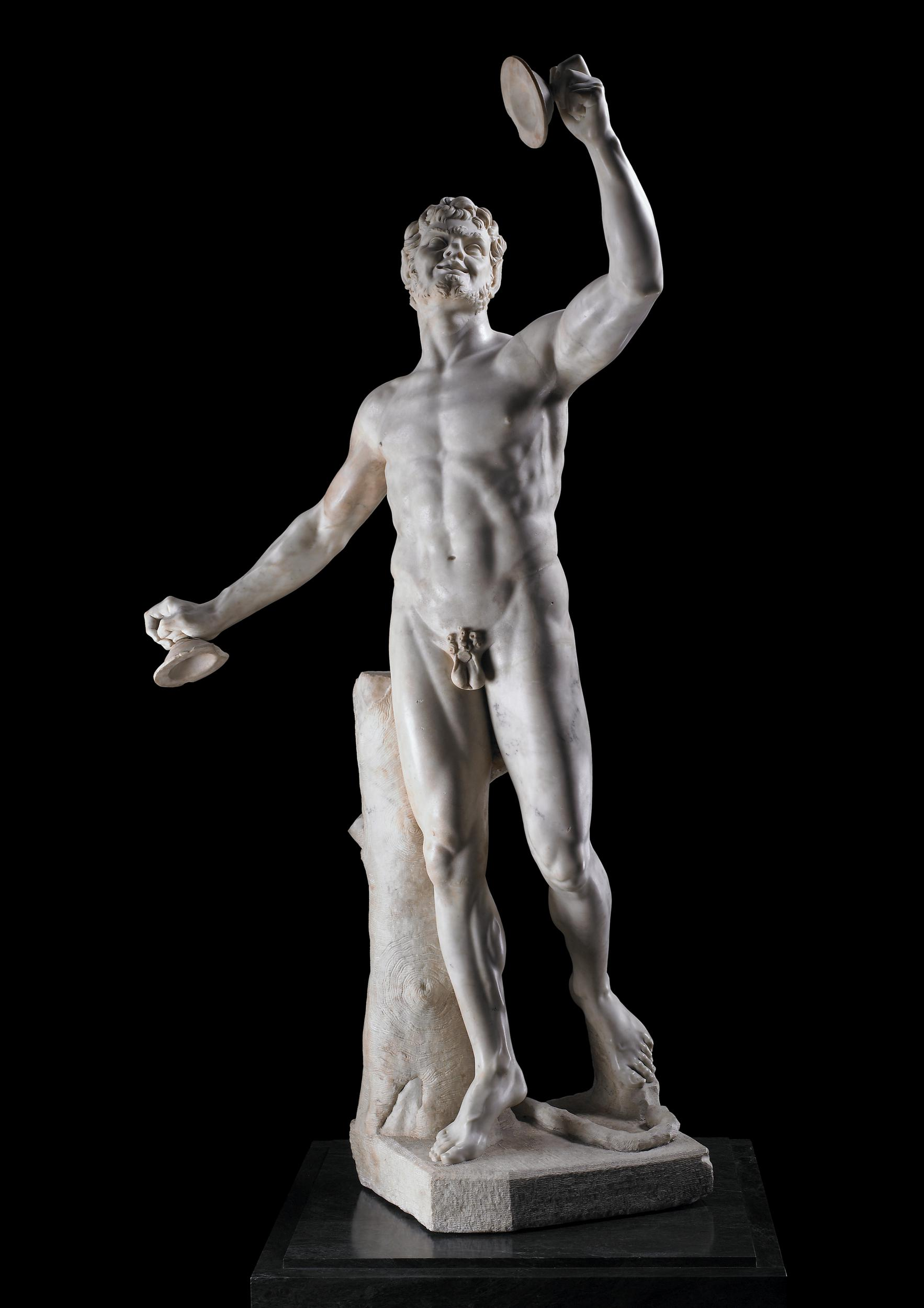
- Artist: François Duquesnoy
- Year: 1620s
- Type: Sculpture
- Medium: Marble
- Subject: A faun
- Dimensions: 175 cm (70 in)
- Location: British Museum; London; 51.5195°N 0.1269°W

The Rondanini Faun is a marble sculpture by Flemish artist François Duquesnoy. It is part of the collection at the British Museum in London. The Rondanini Faun was built on an ancient torso, completed by Duquesnoy between 1625 and 1630. Duquesnoy's completion of antiques was acclaimed in Rome as 'absolutely perfect.' In 17th-century restoration of antique statues, the latter were often imbued with Baroque style by the contemporary sculptor who completed the opus. Albeit not excessively so, the Rondanini is no exception, its broad movement being proof thereof. Duquesnoy is known to have produced at least the limbs and the head for this figure, completing a severed torso with a faun tail. Duquesnoy's Faun takes its name from the Palazzo Rondanini in Rome, where it was once kept.

== Sculpture ==
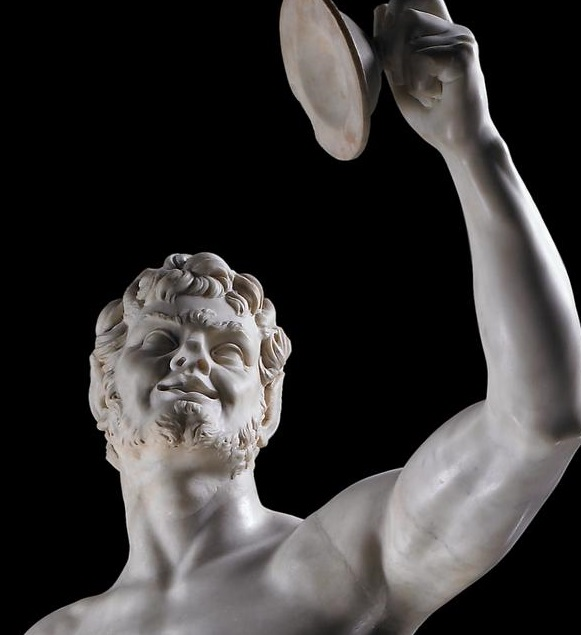
Rondanini Faun, head, detail

The restored statue was attributed to Duquesnoy by the latter's biographer, Giovanni Pietro Bellori. Duquesnoy's pupil, Orfeo Boselli, attributed the statue to the Fiammingo.

In his Osservazioni, in the chapter treating restoration, Boselli cited the Rondanini Faun as proof of Duquesnoy's skills in the practice. As reported by Estelle Lingo "Boselli described the figure as leaping, and the [Rondanini Faun] is indeed represented in mid action, up on the toes of his right foot with his left foot lifted, both arms extended and head raised, as if he had just leapt and struck the cymbals he is holding." The broad movement of the faun is sign of the Baroque influence in Duquesnoy's day, an admirer of la maniere greca, who in this instance (the restoration of a sculpture ancient per se) nonetheless allowed Baroque influence to permeate the statue.

Duquesnoy provided at least the head and the limbs for this sculpture, originally a severed torso with a faun tail. The upper limbs are what conveys the broad movement of the figure. The Fiammingo completed this oeuvre for Alessandro Rondanini, and in fact the sculpture take its name from the Palazzo Rondanini in Rome.
