= Evelina Borea =

Italian art historian, author and curator

- Born: 22 September 1931 (age 95); Ferrara, Italy
- Education: University of Florence (M.A.)
- Occupation: Art historian

Evelina Borea (born 1931, Ferrara, Italy) is an Italian art historian, author and curator.

== Biography ==
Evelina Borea obtained a degree in History of Art in 1958 at the University of Florence. Her tutor and mentor was art historian Roberto Longhi.

In 1976 Borea edited a publication of Gian Pietro Bellori's Lives, with a preface by Giovanni Previtali for Einaudi.

Borea curated major exhibitions, notably Caravaggio e Caravaggeschi nelle Gallerie di Firenze (1970) and L'idea del bello in spring 2000. She is the author of studies on Domenichino (1965), Rosso Fiorentino (1965), Francesco Mochi (1966), Caravaggio and the Caravaggeschi (1966), and Annibale Carracci (1986).

== Bibliography ==
Borea, Evelina (1965). Domenichino. Milan: Edizioni per il Club del Libro.
Borea, Evelina (1965). Rosso Fiorentino. Milan: Fratelli Fabbri.
Borea, Evelina (1965). Il Chiostrino dell'Annunziata a Firenze. Milan: Fratelli Fabbri.
Borea, Evelina (1966). Francesco Mochi. Milan: Fratelli Fabbri.
Borea, Evelina (1970). Caravaggio e caravaggeschi nelle gallerie di Firenze. Florence: Palazzo Pitti.
Borea, Evelina; Bellori, Gian Pietro (1976). Le vite de' pittori, scultori e architetti moderni. Turin: G. Einaudi.
Borea, Evelina (1986). Annibale Carracci e i suoi incisori. École franc̜aise de Rome.
Borea, Evelina (2000). L'idea del bello: viaggio per Roma nel Seicento con Giovan Pietro Bellori. Rome: Edizioni de Luca.
