= Saint Andrew (Duquesnoy) =

Sculpture by François Duquesnoy

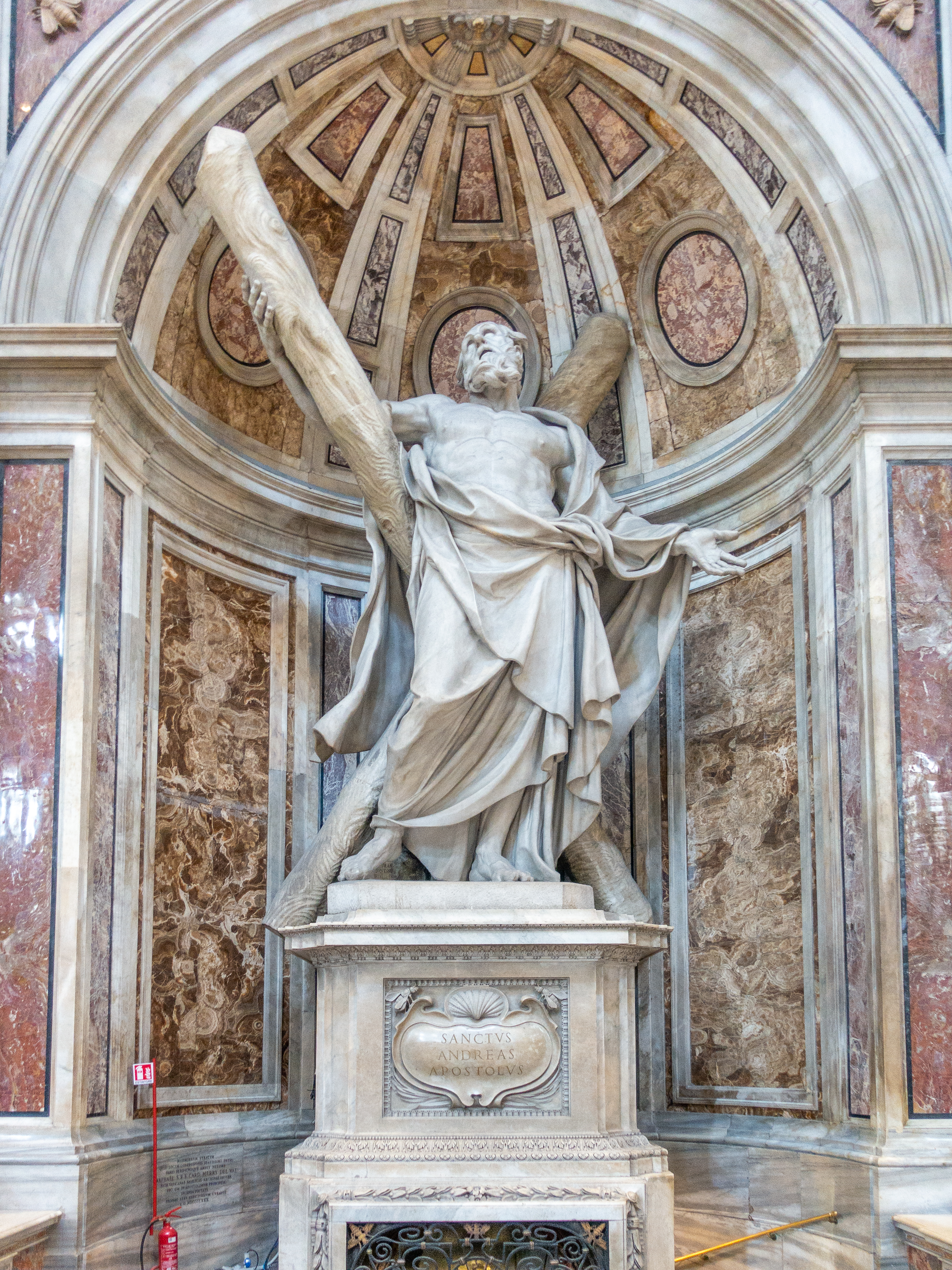
- Artist: François Duquesnoy
- Year: 1629–1633
- Type: Sculpture
- Medium: Marble
- Subject: Saint Andrew
- Dimensions: 450 cm (180 in)
- Location: St. Peter's Basilica; Vatican City

The Saint Andrew is a larger-than-life marble sculpture by Flemish artist François Duquesnoy, executed between 1629 and 1633. Located in the crossing of Saint Peter Basilica in Rome, the work depicts Andrew the Apostle leaning over the crux decussata of his martyrdom. Duquesnoy's St Andrew is one of four colossal statues beneath the dome of St. Peter, standing opposite to Bernini's less restrained Saint Longinus. The four colossi were installed in niches within the four piers supporting the dome between 1639 and 1640.

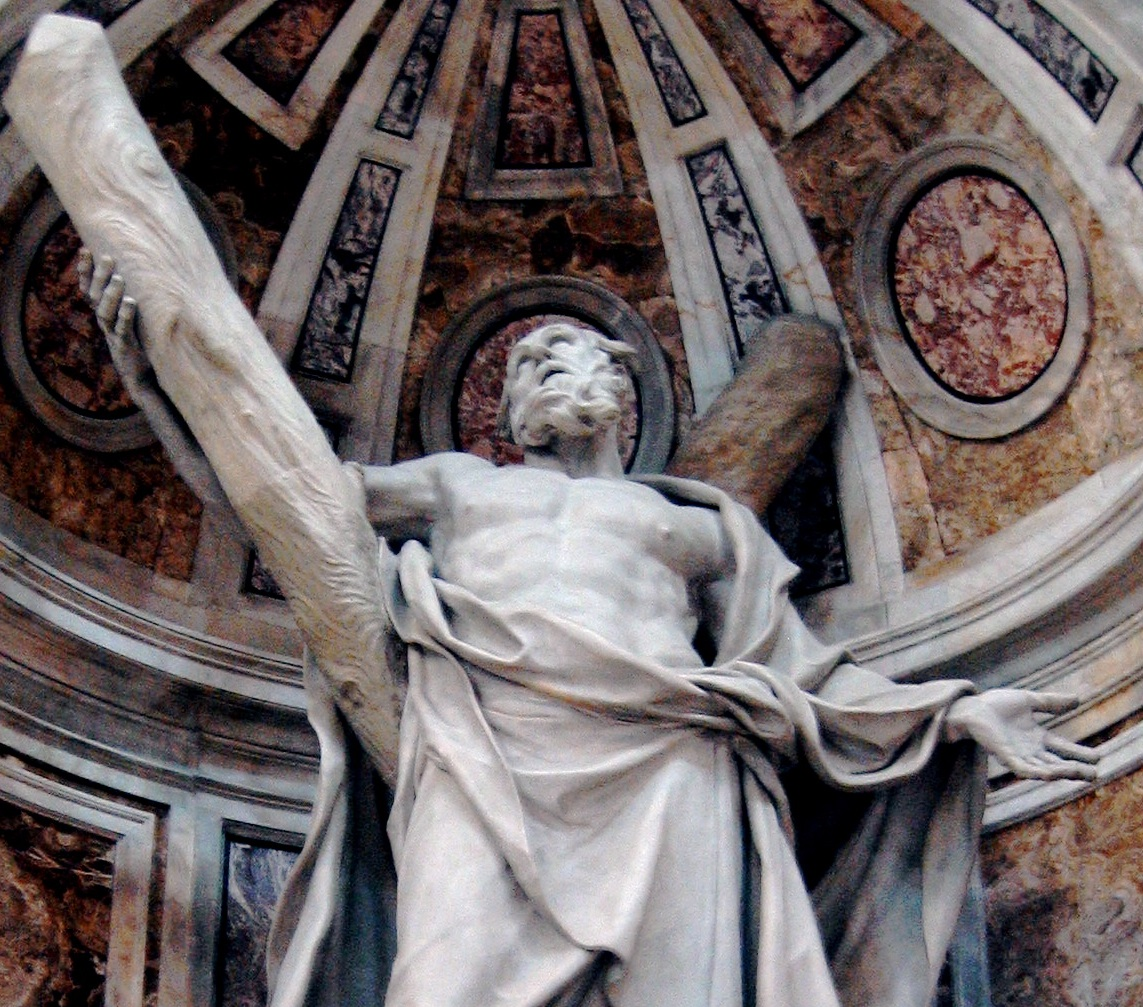
Close-up of the sculpture

== Background, commission and production ==
There is debate over whether Duquesnoy was commissioned first the Saint Susanna or the Saint Andrew, and whether the critical success of the former secured Duquesnoy the commission of the latter or the other way around, with modern scholars leaning toward the assumption that the Saint Andrew was commissioned first, based on documentary records.

In a letter to Duquesnoy by Peter Paul Rubens, which the latter penned to thank the former for the models after the Van den Eynde's putti, Rubens praises the beauty of the Van den Eynde's putti and refers to the fame of the Saint Andrew, but he makes no mention of the Saint Susanna.

The full-scale stucco model of St. Andrew was unveiled in its intended niche on December 19, 1629, in front of the Pope and the attending cardinals. Among them, was Cardinal Biscia, the cardinal protector of the confraternity of the Baker's guild (which undertook the commission of Duquesnoy's St. Susanna in San Maria di Loreto). He might in fact have recommended Duquesnoy to the confraternity overseeing the works for S. Maria di Loreto after seeing Duquesnoy's full-scale model of the St. Andrew.

Upon its unveiling, the statue was closely scrutinized by critics and other artists in Saint Peter. It was well received by both.

As for those on his concurrent work on the St. Susanna, payments for Duquesnoy's work on the St. Andrews were interrupted in the summer of 1633. Duquesnoy received his final blocks of marble for the St. Andrew in April 1633. Payments were issued to him in April and May, but were then interrupted until March 1634. Payments were then resumed, and they continued at monthly intervals for the next several years. According to Sandrart, due to "intrigues against Duquesnoy," payments to the sculptor for his work on the Saint Andrew were so delayed that he became desperate. Duquesnoy was able to finish the St. Andrew thanks to Giustiniani, who advanced him 300 scudi for a sculpture of the Virgin he commissioned from Duquesnoy.

== Style and composition ==
The four colossi in Saint Peter were approved by the Congregazione della Fabbrica of Saint Peter in a meeting held in May 1628. While contemporary biographers of Duquesnoy and earlier, 20th century scholars believed that in this meeting a model by Duquesnoy (according to them risen to fame thanks to his Saint Susanna) received the approval of the Pope, modern scholars have come to disprove such assumption. In 1968, Irving Lavin noted that in the official transcription of the May 1628 meeting, it was recorded that the model chosen by the Pope for Saint Andrew was in fact Gian Lorenzo Bernini's. Duquesnoy got involved only later, and, in fact, it likely was the reception of Duquesnoy's stucco model for the St. Andrew that helped him secure his commission for the St. Susanna.

Bernini's original design for the Saint Andrew and the Saint Longinius posed the saints in contrasting postures of adoration, with their gaze directed up towards the Resurrected Christ originally planned to sit on top of the Baldacchino. Saint Andrew was planned by Bernini to be the more active of the two figures.

In 1631, plans changed, and the Resurrected Christ was replaced by the Baldacchino's globe and cross. Bernini revisited his project for the St. Longinius, finally opting for the portrayal of the Saint in the narrative context of his story. The result was a figure much closer to Duquesnoy's St. Andrew, albeit more active, with the saint depicted when he discovers the Christ's divinity after piercing the Christ with his lance.

The Saint Andrew remained unchanged from its early stucco model by Duquesnoy, but, according to Irving Lavin, "its intended significance was shifted from St. Andrew's adoration of the risen Christ to his emulation of the Crucifixion."

In spite of its postural similarity to Bernini's St. Longinius, Duquesnoy's opus clearly bears Duquesnoy's mark, affected as it is by the latter's maniera greca, which was at odds with Bernini's approach. The large, muscular, Laocoön-like torso of the Saint Andrew, standing leaned against his carefully detailed saltire cross, is indeed an "almost direct quotation of the ancient sculpture; so unlike with Bernini's solutions, yet so congruent with Duquesnoy's ideas about the Greek manner." Duquesnoy's Saint Andrew stands in Saint Peter opposite to Bernini's Longinius, and while both figures are unquestionably Baroque, in contrast to the more dynamic composition of Bernini, Duquesnoy's Saint Andrew is quite static; its draperies are motionless, which is at odds with the billowing clothing of Bernini's Longinius.

== Sources ==
- Lavin, Irving (1968). Bernini and the crossing of Saint Peter's. New York University Press.
- Hutton, James (1935). The Greek anthology in Italy to the year 1800. Ithaca, N.Y., Cornell University Press.
- Fransolet, Mariette (1942). Francois du Quesnoy, sculpteur d'Urbain VIII, 1597–1643. Bruxelles, Belgium: Academie Royale de Belgique.
- Lingo, Estelle (2002). "The Greek Manner and a Christian 'Canon': François Duquesnoy's 'Saint Susanna'". The Art Bulletin. 84 (1). The Art Bulletin (Vol. 84, No. 1): 65–93. doi:10.2307/3177253. JSTOR 3177253.
- Lingo, Estelle Cecile (2007). François Duquesnoy and the Greek Ideal. New Haven, Connecticut: Yale University Press. ISBN 9780300124835.
- Boudon-Machuel, Marion (2005). François Du Quesnoy. Paris, France: Arthena.
- Bellori, Gian Pietro (1672). The Lives of the Artists. Moscardi, Rome.
- Passeri, Giovanni Battista (1772). Vite de pittori, scultori ed architetti che anno lavorato in Roma, morti dal 1641 fino al 1673. Settari, Rome.
- "Saint Andrew". Web Gallery of Art.
- Boselli, Orfeo (1978). Osservazioni della scoltura antica. Edizioni S.P.E.S.
