= Adonis (Duquesnoy) =

Marble sculpture by Flemish artist François Duquesnoy

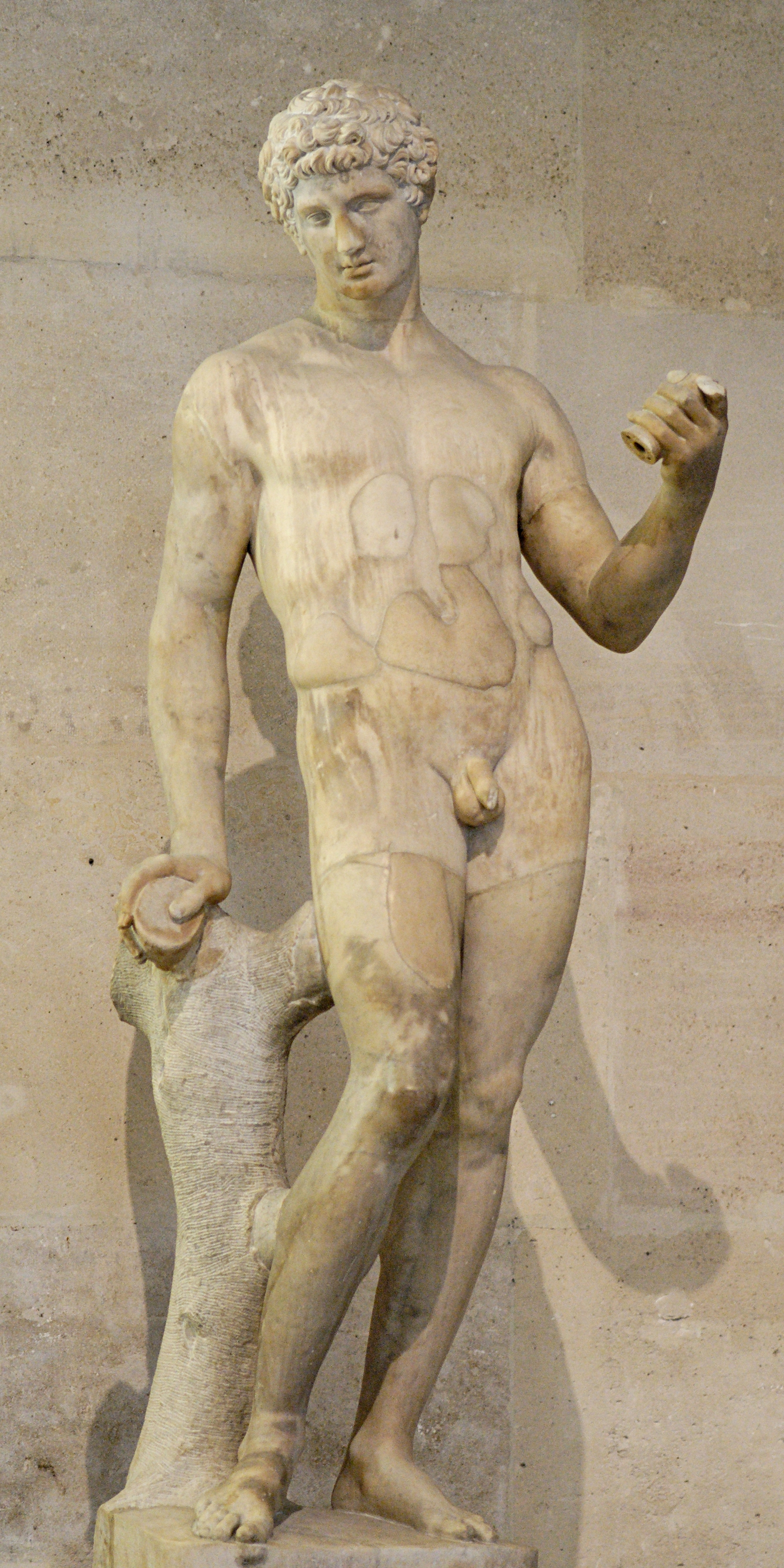
- Artist: François Duquesnoy
- Year: Early 17th century
- Type: Sculpture
- Medium: Marble
- Subject: Adonis
- Dimensions: 185 cm (72.8 in)
- Location: The Louvre; Paris; 48°51′40″N 2°20′11″E

Adonis, also known as Adonis Mazarin, is a marble sculpture by Flemish artist François Duquesnoy, who completed it in the early 17th century. The Adonis bears the signature of Duquesnoy, and the statue, created around an ancient torso, should be indeed accepted as "a veritable artistic creation [of Duquesnoy]". It depicts Adonis, the mortal lover of the goddess Aphrodite in Greek mythology. The backward tilt of the figure is reminiscent of Duquesnoy's bronze Mercury. The sculpture is housed at The Louvre in Paris.

== Subject ==
The subject of the sculpture is Adonis, offspring of the incestuous love between Myrrha and her own father, the king of Cyprus. Myrrha tricked her own father into having coitus with her, but he discovered her identity and chased her with a sword. Myrrha then pleaded to the gods, who transformed her into a myrrh tree. In the tree form, she gave birth to Adonis.

Aphrodite found the infant; she was charmed by its beauty, put it into a box (according to tradition), and sent it to Persephone. Adonis grew up to be a youth of remarkable beauty, causing Aphrodite and Persephone, who now refused to let him go, to fight over him. Zeus eventually decreed that Adonis would spend one third of the year in the Underworld with Persephone, one third of the year with Aphrodite, and a third of the year with whomever he wished.

According to Ovid'd first-century telling of the myth, Adonis was then deadly wounded by a wild boar while hunting. According to Ovid, he bled to death in Aphrodite's arms. In different versions of the story, the boar was sent by Ares, who was jealous of Adonis because Aphrodite was spending too much time with the mortal or, as hinted at by Euripides, by Artemis, who wanted revenge against Aphrodite for killing her favourite Hippolytus (Adonis, as a hunter, ventured into the woods and crossed the border into Artemis' realm, and was thereupon killed by a boar).

== Background and sculpture ==
Duquesnoy's completion of ancient sculptures was acclaimed by his contemporaries as 'absolutely perfect'. Another notable example of his work is his Rondanini Faun. Antique statues were often permeated with the Baroque style by the contemporary artist who carried out the work in the 17th century.

In the case of the Adonis, completed, as the Rondanini Faun, from an ancient torso, the graceful tilt of the subject is reminiscent of Duquesnoy's Mercury, which showcases both Duquesnoy's "Greek" vision and the Baroque influence of his day. The statue of the Adonis is an original composition by Duquesnoy, bearing his signature. Indeed, according to the Comité français d'histoire de l'art, the opus "must be accepted as a veritable artistic creation [of Duquesnoy]."

The statue is also known as Adonis Mazarin, because once it was part of the collection of Cardinal Mazarin. The statue became then part of Marquis de La Meilleraye, Duc de Mazarin's collection. The latter mutilated the sculpture in a fit of madness in the late 17th century.
