= Francesco Angeloni =

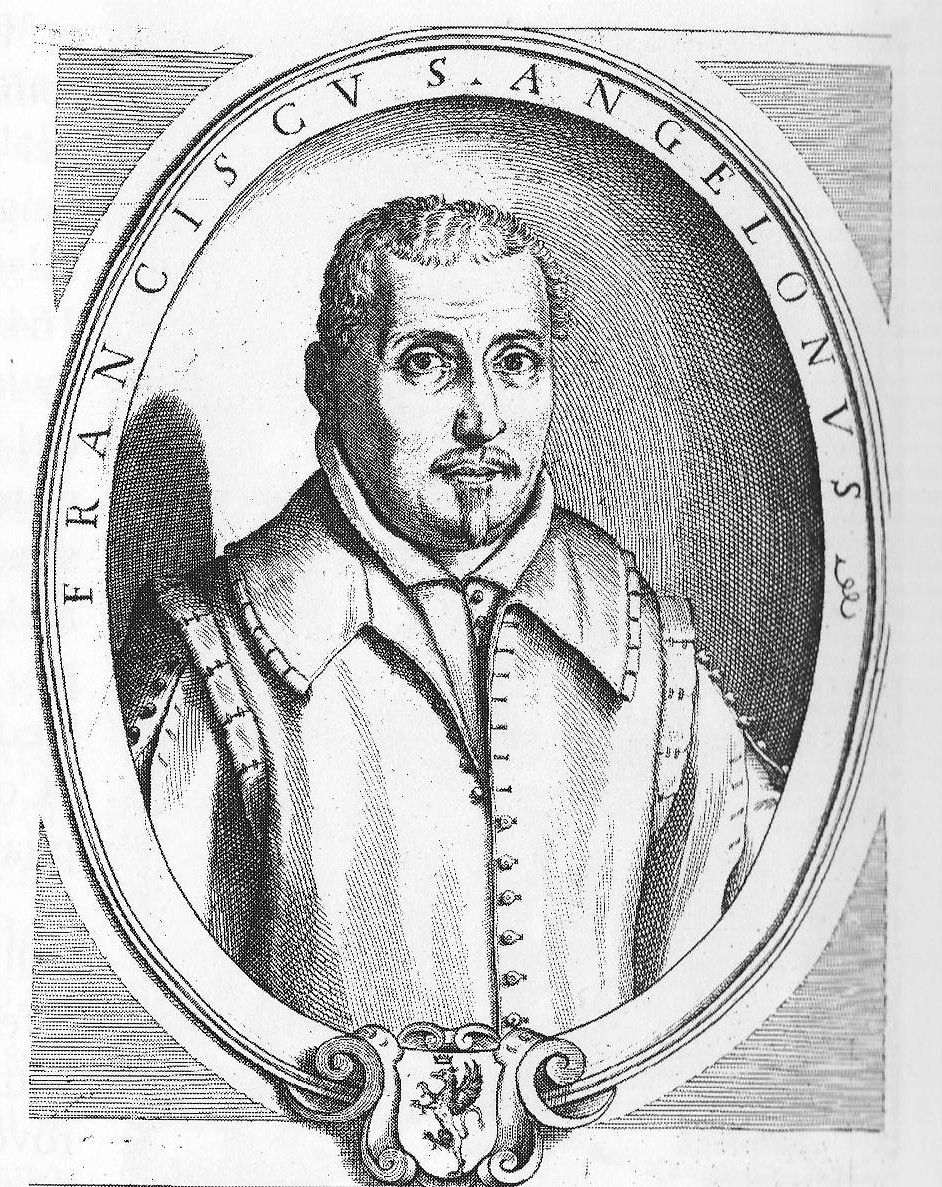
- Francesco Angeloni
- Born: 1559; Terni, Papal States
- Died: 29 November 1652 (aged 92–93); Rome, Papal States
- Occupations: Historian; Writer; Protonotary apostolic
- Parent(s): Giovan Pietro Angeloni and Prantilla Angeloni (née Pontani)

Academic background
- Education: University of Perugia

Academic work
- Discipline: Ancient history, Art history, Numismatics
- Influenced: Giovanni Pietro Bellori

Francesco Angeloni (after 1559 – 29 November 1652) was an Italian writer, antiquary, historian and collector of a wide range of objects including classical antiquities and drawings.

== Biography ==
Born in Terni in Umbria—a region of Italy at that time part of the Papal States—he studied in Perugia then moved to Rome, where he served as secretary of cardinal Ippolito Aldobrandini, later Pope Clement VIII (d. 1605), and for a time as chief notary to the Papacy.

Angeloni dedicated most of his life in collecting antique coins, medallions, books, paintings, and archaeological artifacts and achieved fame in Europe with the publication in 1641 of his edition of the Historia Augusta, a history of ancient Rome since Julius Caesar to Constantine the Great, illustrated with antique coins of the times: Historia Augusta da Giulio Cesare infino a Costantino il Magno illustrata con la verità delle antiche medaglie (1641, with a second edition edited by Bellori in 1685). He also wrote comedies and 38 novelle and a Storia di Terni (1646), a history of his hometown.

In his house on the Pincio hill, from 1634 Angeloni raised and educated his nephew Giovanni Pietro Bellori, who became a well-known biographer of artists, antiquarian and archaeologist. Angeloni left his collections to Bellori on condition they were kept intact, but the family contested the will and Bellori only received the house, with the collections being dispersed. His collections were large and diverse, but included some 600 drawings by his friend Annibale Carracci, a large library, and the diverse range of objects typical of the contemporary cabinet of curiosities, but on an unusually large scale. He left a manuscript catalogue. Giovanni Battista Agucchi and Camillo Massimi (uncle of the cardinal of the same name) were particular friends.

== See also ==
- History of Terni, Umbria
