= The Lives of the Artists (Bellori) =

Book by Gian Pietro Bellori

The Lives of the Modern Painters, Sculptors, and Architects
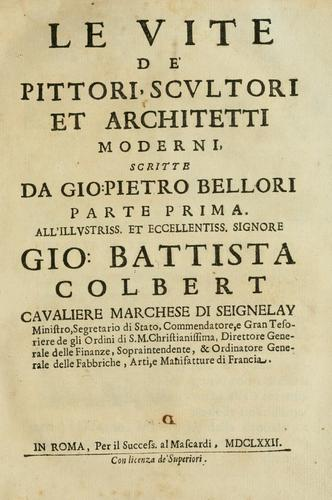
- Cover to the 1672 edition.
- Author: Gian Pietro Bellori
- Original title: Le vite de' pittori, scultori et architetti moderni
- Language: Italian
- Subject: Artist biographies
- Publisher: Mascardi, Rome (1672)
- Publication date: 1672, 1728
- Publication place: Italy
- English publication date: 2005 (in full)

The Lives of the Modern Painters, Sculptors, and Architects or Le vite de' pittori, scultori et architetti moderni is a series of artist biographies written by Gian Pietro Bellori (1613–1696), whom Julius von Schlosser called "the most important historiographer of art not only of Rome, but all Italy, even of Europe, in the seventeenth century". It is one of the foundational texts of the history and criticism of European art.

The first edition (1672) was published in Rome. It contained biographies of nine painters (Annibale and Agostino Carracci, Barocci, Caravaggio, Rubens, Van Dyck, Domenichino, Lanfranco, and Poussin), two sculptors (François Duquesnoy and Alessandro Algardi), and one architect (Domenico Fontana). The book was dedicated to Jean-Baptiste Colbert and published with French financial support.

== Preface ==
The preface to the Lives is an essay Bellori delivered to the Accademia di San Luca, Rome in 1664. The essay, entitled The Idea of the Painter, the Sculptor and the Architect (L'idea del pittore, dello scultore, e dell'architetto) contributed to a classicist reading of the Lives, as opposed the a book about near-contemporaries.

== Editions and translations ==
Bellori's treatise had an enormous influence throughout Europe. It was summarized in the December 1676 issue of the Journal des sçavans, and its key concepts were disseminated by André Félibien in his major work, Entretiens sur les vies et les ouvrages des plus excellents peintres anciens et modernes (1666–88). Bellori's theories reached England through John Dryden's translation of The Idea of the Painter, the Sculptor and the Architect in his preface to the 1695 translation of Charles Alphonse du Fresnoy's Latin poem, De arte graphica (1667) and influenced both Shaftesbury and Reynolds. William Aglionby's major work, Painting Illustrated in Three Diallogues [sic] (1685), borrows heavily from Bellori's Vite. Winckelmann's theory of the "ideally beautiful" as he expounds it in Geschichte der Kunst des Altertums, IV.2.33 ff., thoroughly agrees with the content of Bellori's Idea.

Prior to 2005, only the Idea and the biographies of the Carracci, Barocci, Caravaggio and Van Dyck had been translated into English. The 2005 translation by Alice Sedgwick Wohl is based on the 1976 Italian edition by Evelina Borea controlled against the editio princeps of 1672 and Michelangelo Piacentini's transcription of MS 2506 (one of two copies, ca. 1700) of the Bibliothèque Municipale de Rouen, of the biographies of Guido Reni, Andrea Sacchi and Carlo Maratta.

Bellori was unable to obtain funding for a second edition. The 12 biographies were republished in 1728 in Naples as a pirated edition, with the addition of a biography of Luca Giordano (1632-1705) by an unknown author.

Image	Name	Publication	Page
	Annibale Carracci	Le vite de' pittori, scultori et architetti moderni, 1672	19
	Agostino Carracci	Le vite de' pittori, scultori et architetti moderni, 1672	103
	Domenico Fontana	Le vite de' pittori, scultori et architetti moderni, 1672	141
	Federico Barocci	Le vite de' pittori, scultori et architetti moderni, 1672	169
	Caravaggio	Le vite de' pittori, scultori et architetti moderni, 1672	201
	Pieter Paul Rubens	Le vite de' pittori, scultori et architetti moderni, 1672	221
	Antoon van Dyck	Le vite de' pittori, scultori et architetti moderni, 1672	253
	François Duquesnoy	Le vite de' pittori, scultori et architetti moderni, 1672	269
	Domenichino	Le vite de' pittori, scultori et architetti moderni, 1672	289
	Giovanni Lanfranco	Le vite de' pittori, scultori et architetti moderni, 1672	365
	Alessandro Algardi	Le vite de' pittori, scultori et architetti moderni, 1672	387
	Nicolas Poussin	Le vite de' pittori, scultori et architetti moderni, 1672	407
