= Jérôme Duquesnoy the Younger =

Flemish architect and sculptor

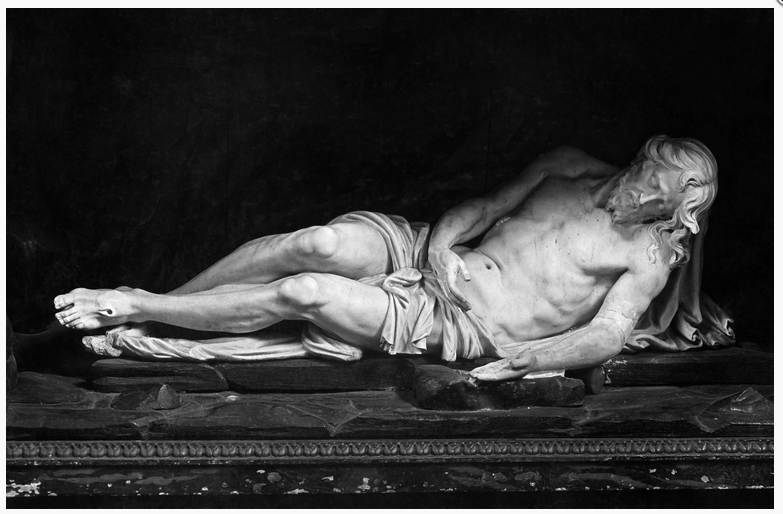
Dead Christ for the St. Egidius Church, Groot-Bijgaarden, destroyed by a V-2 rocket in 1945

Jérôme Duquesnoy the Younger (French: Jérôme Duquesnoy le Jeune; baptized 8 May 1602 – 28 September 1654), or Hieronymus Duquesnoy the Younger (Dutch: Hiëronymus Duquesnoy de Jonge), was a Flemish architect and sculptor who was particularly accomplished in portraits. He played an important role in the introduction of the Baroque style in Northern European sculpture.

== Life ==
=== Training ===
He was born in Brussels, the son of Jérôme Duquesnoy the Elder, court sculptor to Archduke Albert and Archduchess Isabella who jointly ruled the Spanish Netherlands. His father is now mainly known as the creator of the Manneken Pis fountain in Brussels (1619). He trained in his father's workshop along with his older brother François. François went to work in Rome where he became rather successful.

=== Abroad ===
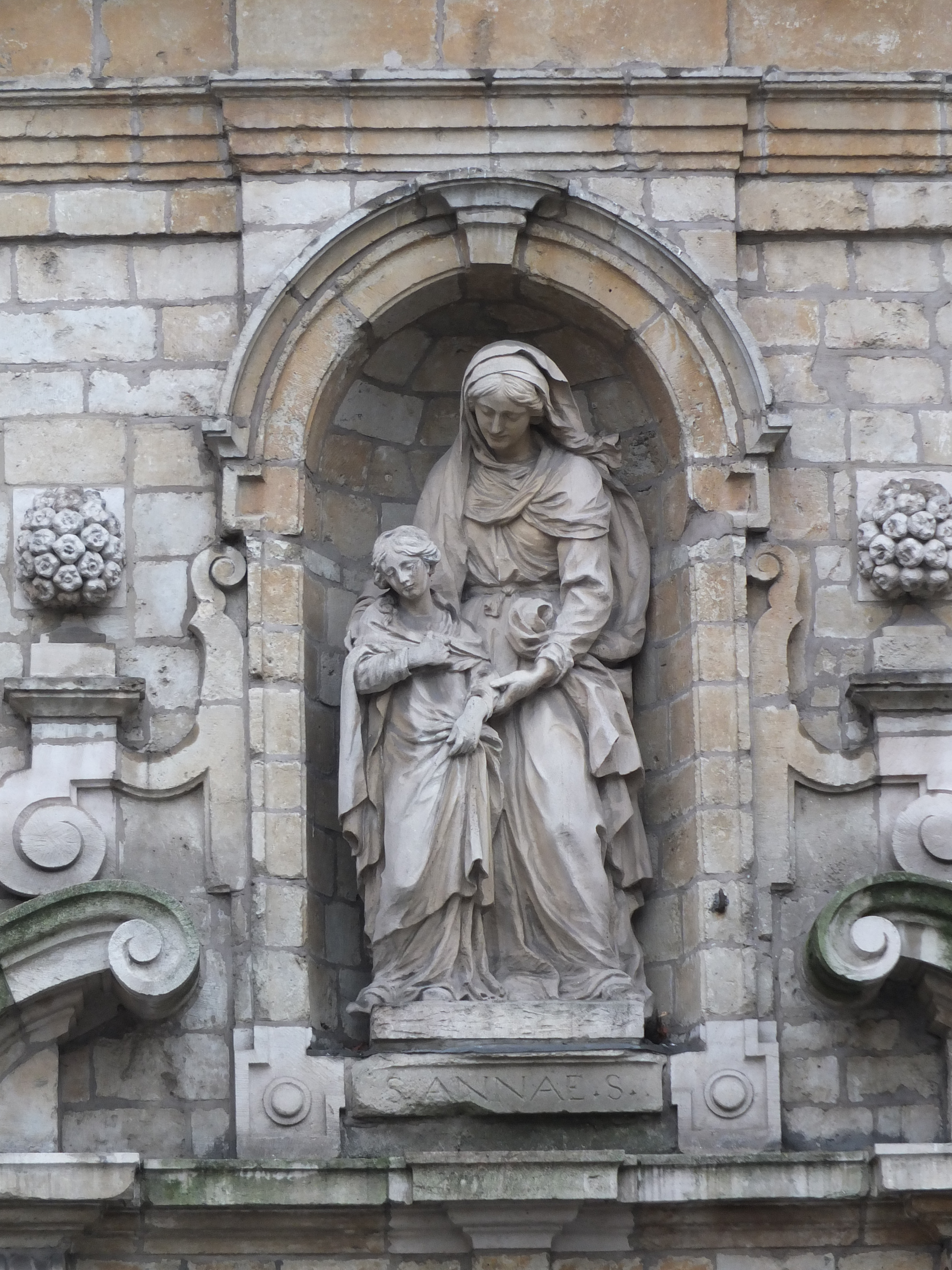
The education of the Holy Virgin by Saint Anna, copy

Jérôme travelled to join his older brother in Rome in 1621. During Anthony van Dyck’s period of residence in Rome, the brothers became friends with him and van Dyck painted their portraits. Jérôme worked with his brother on the baldacchino for Saint Peter's in Rome as is testified by a payment in his own name for that work received in 1627. There is no documentation on Jérôme's movements between 1627 and 1641. The assumption has been that the brothers had a falling out and split ways after which Jerôme went to work primarily in Spain, where he received court commissions, and Portugal. None of his works from that period have been traced. An alternative view of the lack of details on Jérôme's whereabouts and residence in Spain between 1627 and 1641 holds that Jérôme had in fact not left Rome for a long period of time but had been working inside the workshop of his brother in Rome assisting him with his various commissions. The trip to Spain would therefore have only been rather brief and occurred probably in the year 1640. When in 1641 Jérôme is documented as working in the workshop of the Flemish goldsmith Andreas Ghysels in Florence, he may have been doing so in the execution of designs of his brother.

After a stay of nine months in Florence, Duquesnoy returned to Rome. When François left on a trip to France at the invitation of the French king to become the director of a yet to be established department of painting and sculpture called ‘Académie Royale de Peinture et de Sculpture’, Jérôme accompanied him. During the trip François died on 12 July 1643 in Livorno of an illness from which he had already been suffering before he set out.

=== Return to Flanders ===
Instead of returning to Rome, Jérôme travelled on to his hometown Brussels where he soon received many commissions. He claimed the chests with art designs and models that had belonged to his brother and that had been sent on to Brussels.

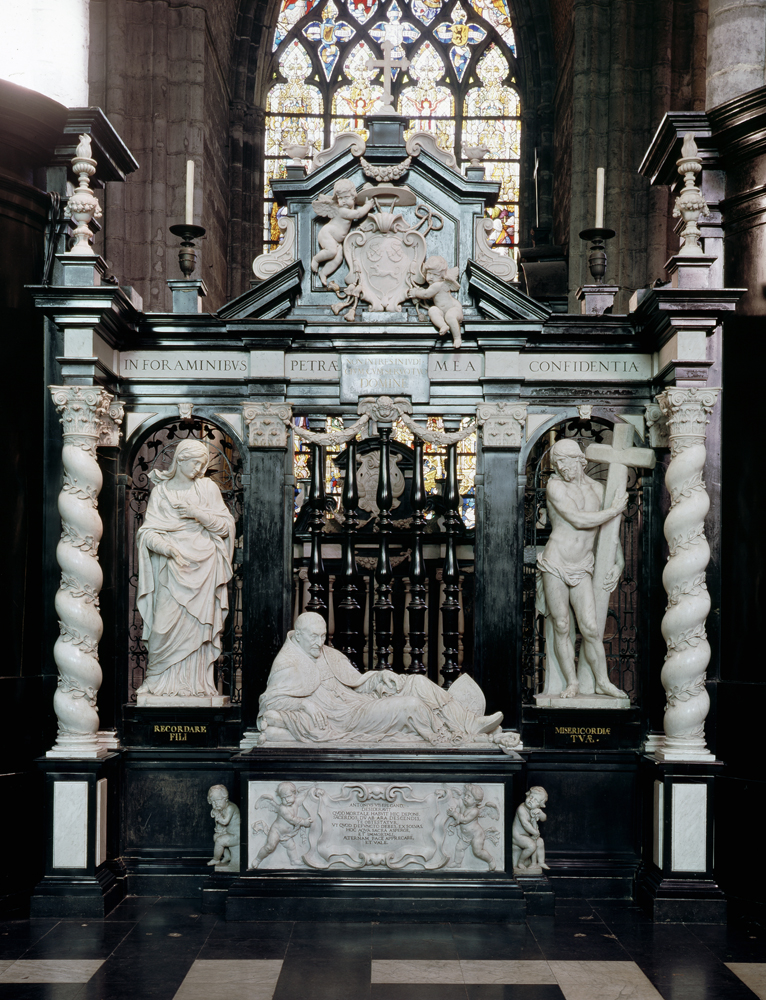
Tomb monument of Bishop Antonius Triest

In 1644 he completed a sculpture of Saint Thomas destined for the Church of St. Michael and St. Gudula (now Brussels' cathedral) and paid for by the Council of Brabant. He also became an assistant of the court architect and painter Jacob Franquart. In 1646 he drew the design for the Chapel of Our Lady of Deliverance in the Church of St. Michael and St. Gudula and directed its construction.

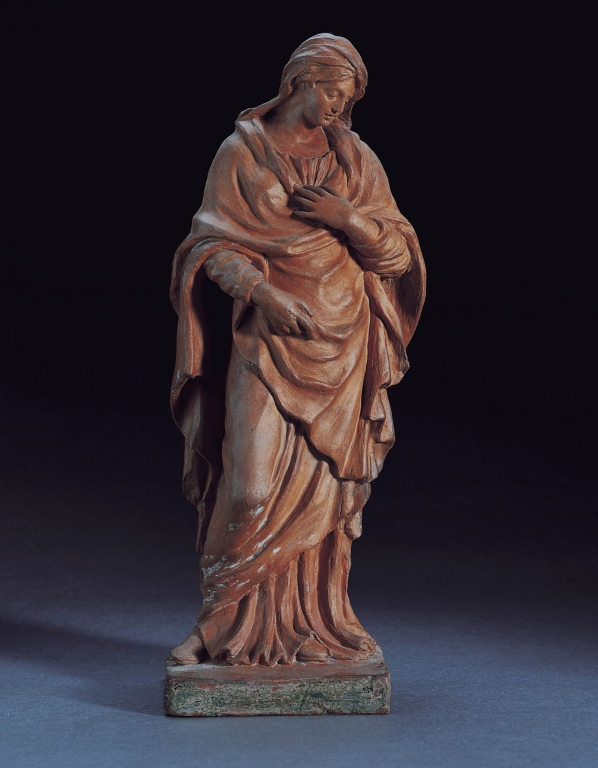
Terracotta modello for a figure of Mary on the Triest tomb

Duquesnoy completed an additional three sculptures of apostles for the Church of St. Michael and St. Gudula in 1646. He also made the images of the apostles Philip and Matthew for the Chapel Church in Brussels. When Jacob Franquart died in 1651, Duquesnoy succeeded to his position at the Brussels court as "architecte, statuaire et sculpteur de la Cour" (Court architect, statue maker and sculptor). In that capacity Duquesnoy completed several portraits of Archduke Leopold Wilhelm of Austria, then governor of the Spanish Netherlands (now in the Kunsthistorisches Museum, Vienna).

He received the commission for the tomb monument of Bishop Antonius Triest to be placed in the choir of the Saint Bavo Cathedral in Ghent. He also received a commission from the family Thurn und Taxis for a marble statue of Saint Ursula to be placed in the Saint Ursula Chapel in the Sablon Church in Brussels.

In 1654 Duquesnoy was living in Ghent to complete the tomb monument of Antonius Triest. He was arrested for sexually abusing two boys of respectively 8 and 11 years old and tried for sodomy. Appeals by his friends to the court in Brussels to transfer jurisdiction over the case from the local court in Ghent to the Royal Magistrate in Brussels were unsuccessful. He was sentenced to strangulation at the stake, followed by burning at the Koornmarkt, a public square in Ghent. The sentence was carried out on 28 September 1654. The tomb of Triest was left to be completed by others.

== Work ==
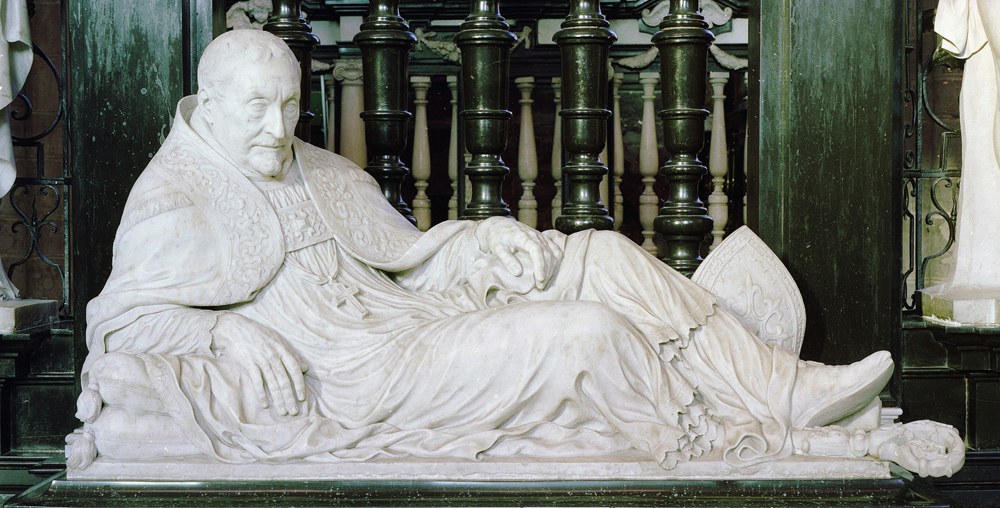
Tomb monument of Bishop Triest (detail)

Jérôme is generally regarded as a skilled sculptor, but a less original or innovative artist than his brother François. His artistic talent has been questioned based on assumptions surrounding the use for his own work of designs made by his brother, and in particular the designs for the bust (now in the Louvre Museum in Paris) and the tomb of Bishop Triest. Already in 1642 Bishop Antonius Triest had approached François Duquesnoy in relation to this bust and monument and had sent along a painting of himself to be used as the basis for the bust. François had declined the commission because of his upcoming move to France but is still said to have made a few terracotta models for putti for the monument. There is no documentation whether or how much work François had done on the design and execution of the bust before he died in 1643. It is therefore difficult to determine how much (if any) of it is of his hand. The work was probably completed in 1643 or 1644 and is signed by Jérôme. The very high quality of the execution of the portrait has led to speculation that his brother had a major (or even sole) role in its design and even execution. It is likely that the design of the tomb monument itself, which was made almost a decade later, was by Jérôme's own hand. The monument is placed in an architectural frame of black and white marble and depicts Mary and Christ looking down on the effigy of the Bishop reclining on a sarcophagus. The portrait of the Bishop in the monument is particularly fine although some have compared it unfavourably with the earlier bust of the Bishop.

He worked in the baroque style with classicistic tendencies pioneered by his brother. One of his most successful works is the marble statue of a kneeling Saint Ursula placed in the Saint Ursula Chapel in the Sablon Church in Brussels. His style can be clearly seen in the marble depicting the Rape of Ganymede (Westphalian State Museum of Art and Cultural History)
