= William Aglionby =

William Aglionby (c. 1642–1705) was an English physician, known also as an art historian, translator and diplomat.

== Life ==
It has been inferred that he was the son of George Aglionby, who was tutor to William Cavendish, 3rd Earl of Devonshire from 1629, and who married Sibella Smith in 1635, dying in 1643. He had an M.D. degree from the University of Bordeaux. Fluency in French later caused him trouble when claiming to be English in France.

Aglionby was elected Fellow of the Royal Society in 1667. From 1669 to 1671 he acted as tutor for Sir Andrew Henley, 1st Baronet and then for Robert Paston, 1st Earl of Yarmouth. In 1679 he was secretary to Sir William Temple at The Hague.

During the 1680s Aglionby was in practice in London as a physician. He was based in Broad Street, and was licensed by the Royal College of Physicians in 1687. At this period he took an active part in the Royal Society.

In 1698 Aglionby was attempting to negotiate a postal treaty with the French Farmer-General of Posts, in Calais. Other diplomatic postings were to Madrid, Turin and Zurich.

Aglionby's associates included James Brydges, Abraham Hill, and Matthew Prior.

== Works ==
Aglionby's major work was Painting Illustrated in Three Diallogues [sic] (1685). It has been described as the first original English book of its kind, based on the theory that Italian history painting was the leading genre of art; it contained eleven biographies of Italian painters.

Aglionby used Giorgio Vasari's Lives, but selectively, and imposing his own views. He began with lives of Cimabue and Giotto, interpolating in the series then a dialogue on the history of painting. There followed: Leonardo da Vinci, Andrea del Sarto, Raphael, Giorgione, Michelangelo, Giulio Romano, Pierino del Vaga, Titian and Donatello. Other sources used include Gian Pietro Bellori and Carlo Cesare Malvasia. Dismissive of Nicolas Poussin, Aglionby mentions favourably if not at length four artists from northern Europe: Dürer, Holbein, Rubens, Van Dyck. The two latter were among the 12 Vite of Bellori, from which he borrows heavily.

From a nationalistic point of view, Aglionby pointed to a revival of the arts at the Restoration of 1660, and promoted the painter John Riley, and the sculptor Grinling Gibbons. As apologetics for English art, which had not contributed to history painting, he argued for its success in portrait painting.

== Works ==
- Art of Chymistry: As it is now Practiced (1668), translation from Cours de Chymie by Pierre Thibaut
- The History of the Pope's Nephews (1669), translation from Gregorio Leti
- The Present State of the United Provinces (1669). Based on Les Délices de la Hollande (1651) by Jean de Parival.
- Whole Art of the Stage (1684), translation from François Hedelin
- Painting Illustrated in Three Diallogues (1685) on archive.org
