= Santa Maria di Loreto, Rome =

Santa Maria di Loreto
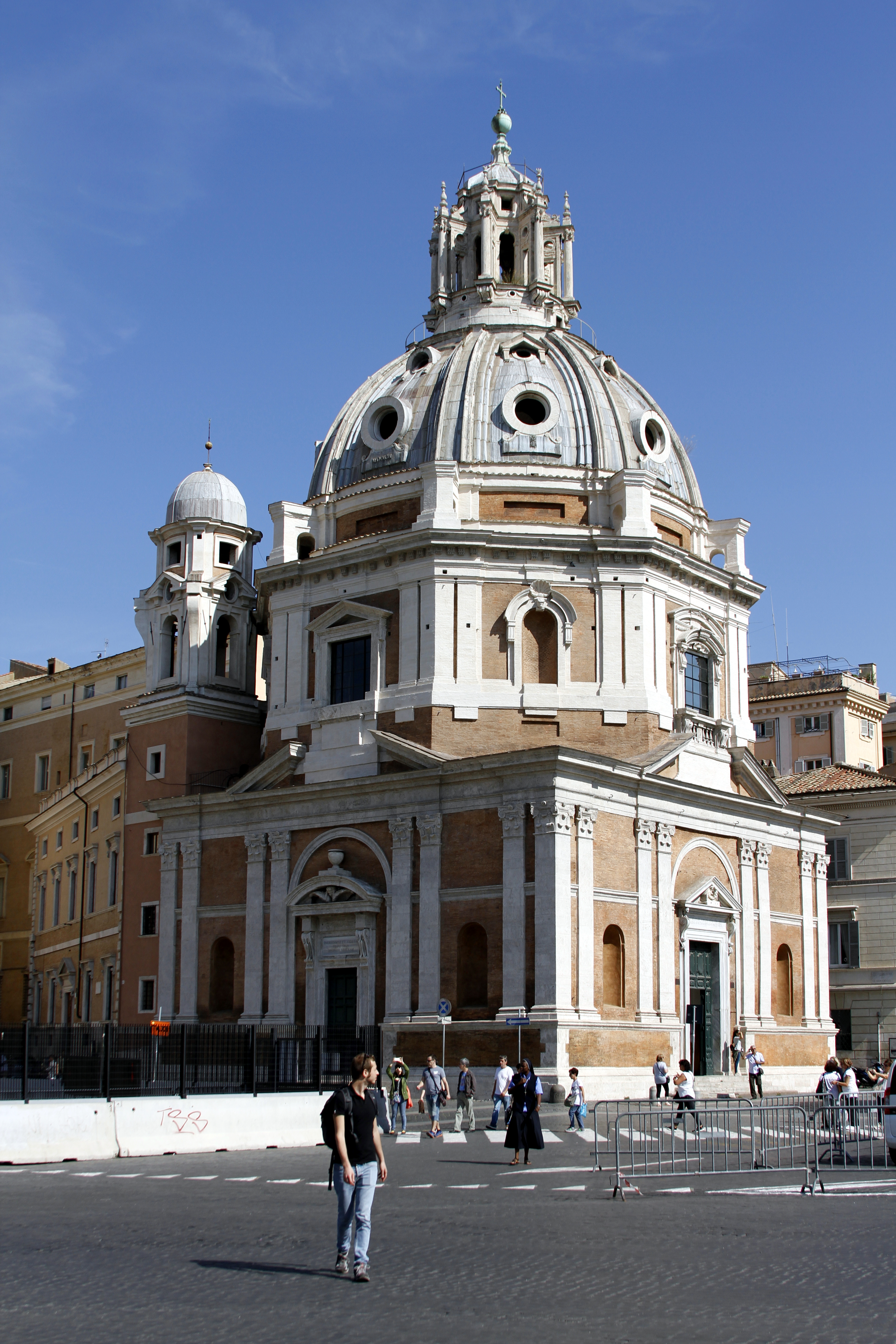
- The church of Santa Maria di Loreto, designed by Antonio da Sangallo the younger
- Click on the map for a fullscreen view
- 41°53′46″N 12°29′03″E
- Location: Rome
- Country: Italy
- Denomination: Roman Catholic

Architecture
- Architect: Antonio da Sangallo the younger
- Architectural type: Church
- Groundbreaking: 1507

Santa Maria di Loreto is a 16th-century church in Rome, central Italy, located just across the street from the Trajan's Column, near the giant Monument of Vittorio Emanuele II.

== History ==
After the Jubilee of 1500, the association of bakers (Sodalizio dei Fornai) received permission from Pope Alexander VI to build a church at this site. Construction of this church began in 1507 under Donato Bramante, carried out by Andrea Sansovino and completed by Antonio da Sangallo the younger. The design called for a square first story and an octagonal second story built in travertine and brick. It was one of the earliest domed square churches built on classical forms. Sangallo's facade is a maturer, more ornate version of the facade of the Palazzo Baldassini.

A second dome and lantern were added by Jacopo del Duca around 1575.

The church was built atop an earlier 15th century chapel, which contained an icon of the Virgin of Loreto, hence the church retained the icon and acquired the title. It is most notable for the adjacent erection of a similarly domed, but pale marble, 18th-century church Santissimo Nome di Maria al Foro Traiano, giving the semblance of twin churches.

== Interior ==
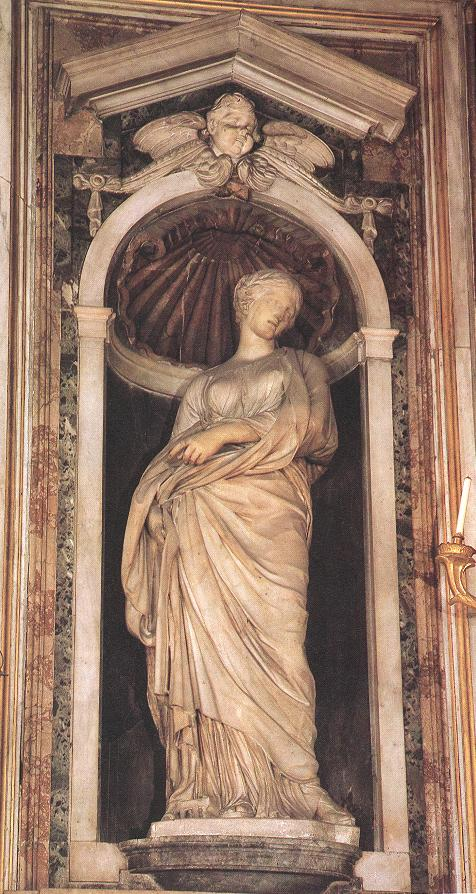
Santa Susanna

The interior decoration is best noted for the statuary, including a statue at the entrance by Andrea Sansovino and around the altar, four angels by Stefano Maderno, and representations of four martyred virgin and Roman saints, apt companions to a church dedicated to the transposed house of the Virgin Mary's Annunciation. The four martyrs in order of completion were Saint Agnes by Pompeo Ferrucci, Saint Flavia Domitilla by Domenico de Rossi, Saint Cecilia by Giuliano Finelli, and the famous early Baroque statue of Santa Susanna by Francois Duquesnoy.

One chapel is covered by mosaics by Paolo Rossetti and was frescoed by the studio of Federigo Zuccaro. The main chapel was built by Onorio Longhi and frescoed by Cavaliere d'Arpino.

== See also ==
- 16th-century Western domes
