= François Duquesnoy =

Flemish sculptor (1597–1643)

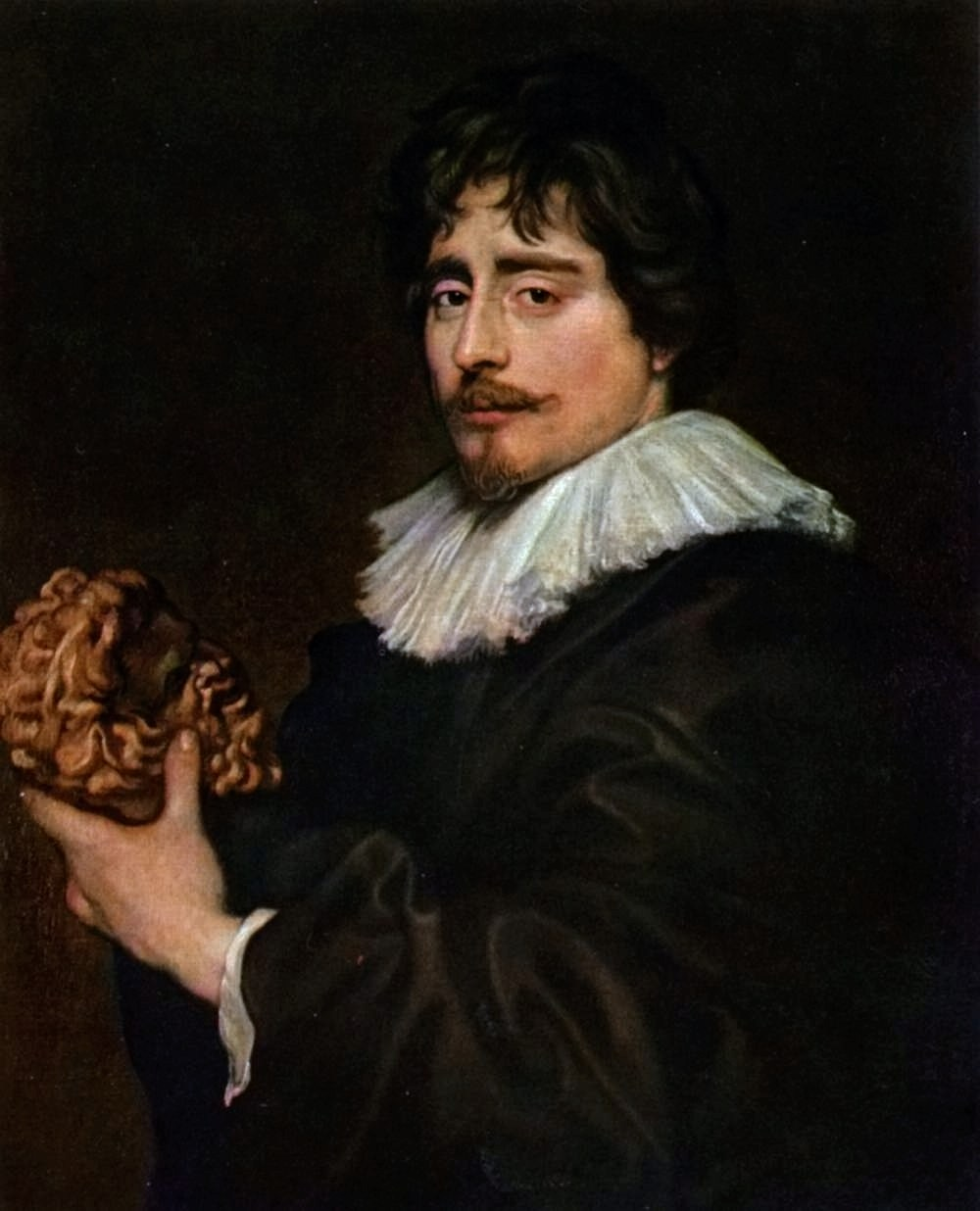
- Portrait by Anthony van Dyck, 1627–1632
- Born: 12 January 1597; Brussels, Duchy of Brabant, Holy Roman Empire
- Died: 18 July 1643 (aged 46); Livorno, Grand Duchy of Tuscany
- Known for: Sculpture
- Notable work: Saint Susanna, Saint Andrew, Tomb of Ferdinand van den Eynde
- Movement: Baroque

François Duquesnoy or Frans Duquesnoy (12 January 1597 – 18 July 1643) was a Flemish Baroque sculptor who was active in Rome for most of his career, where he was known as Il Fiammingo ("the Fleming"). His idealized representations represented a quieter and more restrained version of Italian baroque sculpture, and are often contrasted with the more dramatic and emotional character of Bernini's works, while his style shows a great affinity to Algardi's sculptures.

== Early years ==
Duquesnoy was born in Brussels. Having come from Flanders, Duquesnoy was called Il Fiammingo by the Italians and François Flamand by the French. His father, Jérôme Duquesnoy the Elder, sculptor of the Manneken Pis fountain in Brussels (1619), was the court sculptor to Archduchess Isabella and Archduke Albert, governor of the Low Countries. The sculptor Jérôme Duquesnoy the Younger was his brother. Some of Francois' early work in Brussels attracted the notice of the Archduke, who gave him the wherewithal to study in Rome, where he would spend his whole career.

According to early biographers, when Duquesnoy arrived in Rome in 1618, he studied antique sculpture in detail, climbing over the equestrian Marcus Aurelius to determine how it was cast, or making a pilgrimage to the shrine of Diana at Lake Nemi. In 1624, Nicolas Poussin, who shared his classicly styled, emotionally detached manner of depiction, arrived in Rome, and the two foreign artists lodged together. Both moved in the circle of patronage of Cassiano dal Pozzo. They developed a canon of ideal expressive figures, counter to the theatrical baroque of Bernini. Contemporary critics, like Giovanni Bellori, in Lives of the Modern Painters, Sculptors and Architects from 1672, hailed Duquesnoy's art as restoring contemporary sculpture to quality of antique Roman sculpture. Bellori said that with his Santa Susanna, Duquesnoy "had left to modern sculptors the example for statues of clothed figures, making him more than the equal of the best ancient sculptors...".

Among Duquesnoy's early works are bas-relief putti for Villa Doria Pamphili. In spite of the contrast perceived by contemporaries in their stylistic approaches, Duquesnoy collaborated with Bernini in the design, among others, of the angels offering garlands of the baldacchino for Saint Peter's (in process 1624–1633). The four angels are entirely Duquesnoy's work, and this work earned him future commissions.

== The statue of Santa Susanna ==
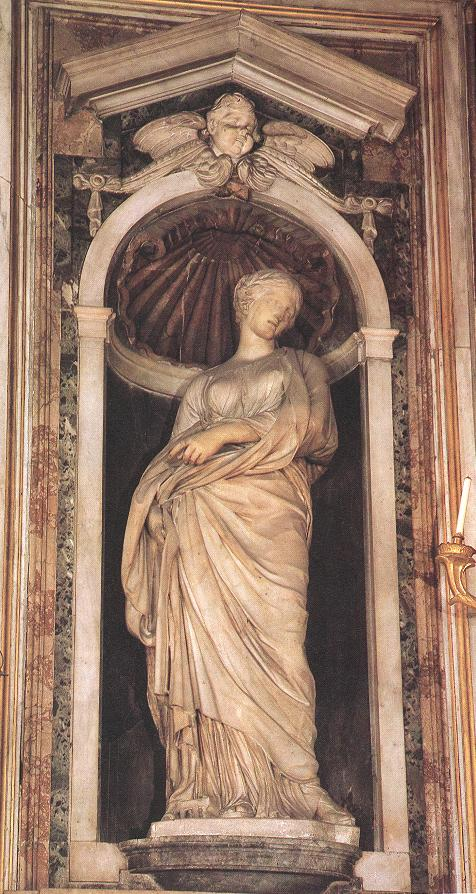
Santa Susanna

Duquesnoy's classicly styled Saint Susanna (1629) depicts the saint as both modest and revealing under marble draperies – "so much so that the pure volume of the members is visible" (Bellori). This is one of four sculptures depicting virgin martyrs by various sculptors for the church of Santa Maria di Loreto in front of the Roman Forum of Trajan (1630–33).

Critics have remarked on the refined surfaces and the softness and sweetness with which Duquesnoy invested this statue. There is a transcendence in her empty gaze. The sculpture was little known until the 18th century, when a marble copy by Guillaume Coustou was sent to Paris (1739) and Duquesnoy's Susanna entered the canon of most-admired modern sculptures.

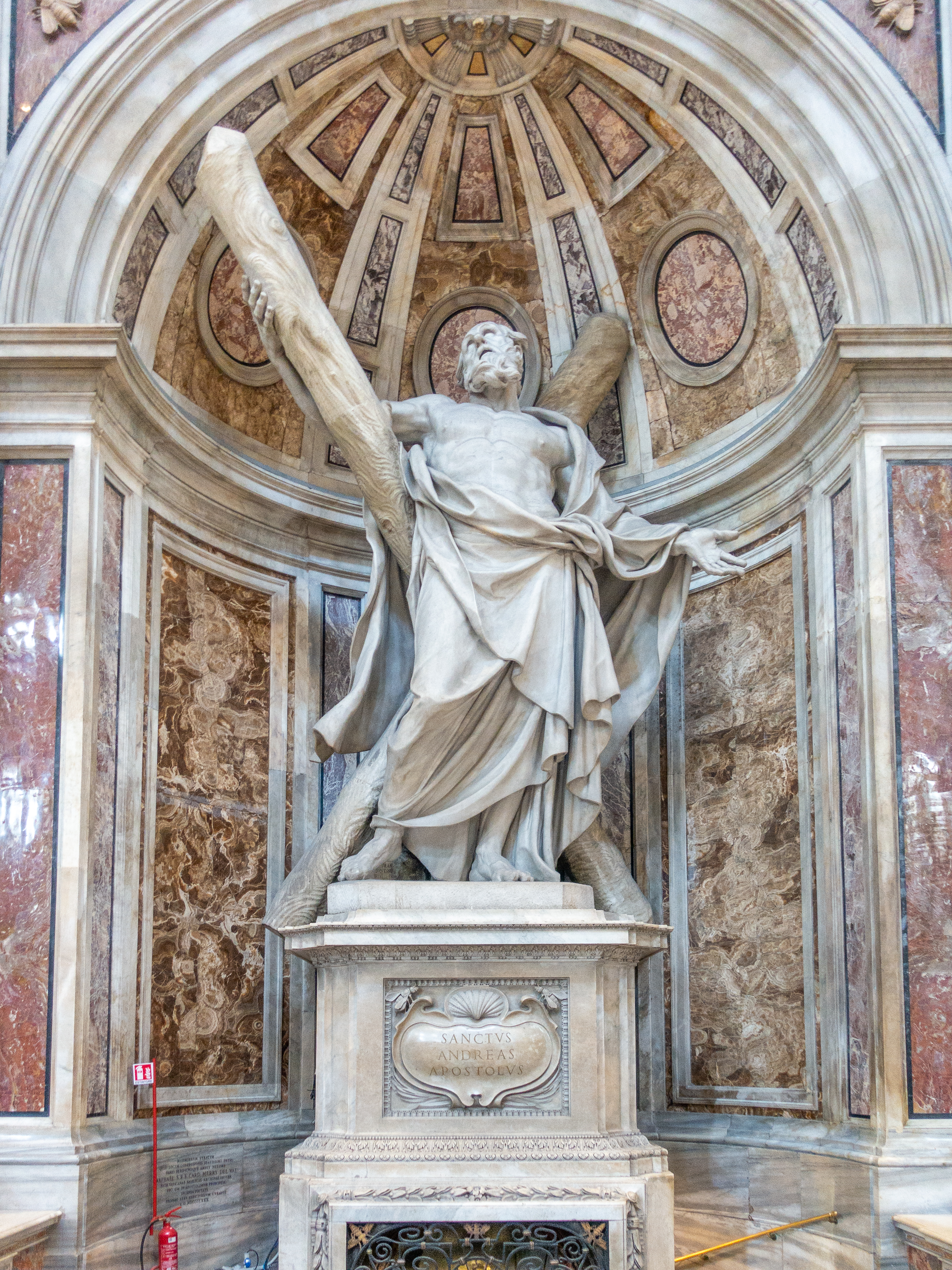
Saint Andrew

== The statue of Saint Andrew in the Transept of St Peter's ==
The more extroverted marble representation of Saint Andrew (1629–33) was begun a few months after his completion of the Santa Bibiana. It is one of the four larger-than-life statues which frame the baldacchino in the transept of St. Peter's Basilica; each statues is associated with the basilica's primary holy relics (the other three statues in St. Peter are Bernini's Saint Longinus, Mochi's Saint Veronica, and Bolgi's St Helena). It is useful to contrast the tone of Andrew with that of Longinus: in Andrew the draperies fall vertically or droop, while Longinus' clothes inflate in improbably starched ebullience. Andrew leans over the saltire cross of his martyrdom, while Longinus theatrically flings arms outward expostulating divine influence. Both statues accentuate the diagonals, but Duquesnoy's is more restrained than either Bernini's or Mochi's contribution.

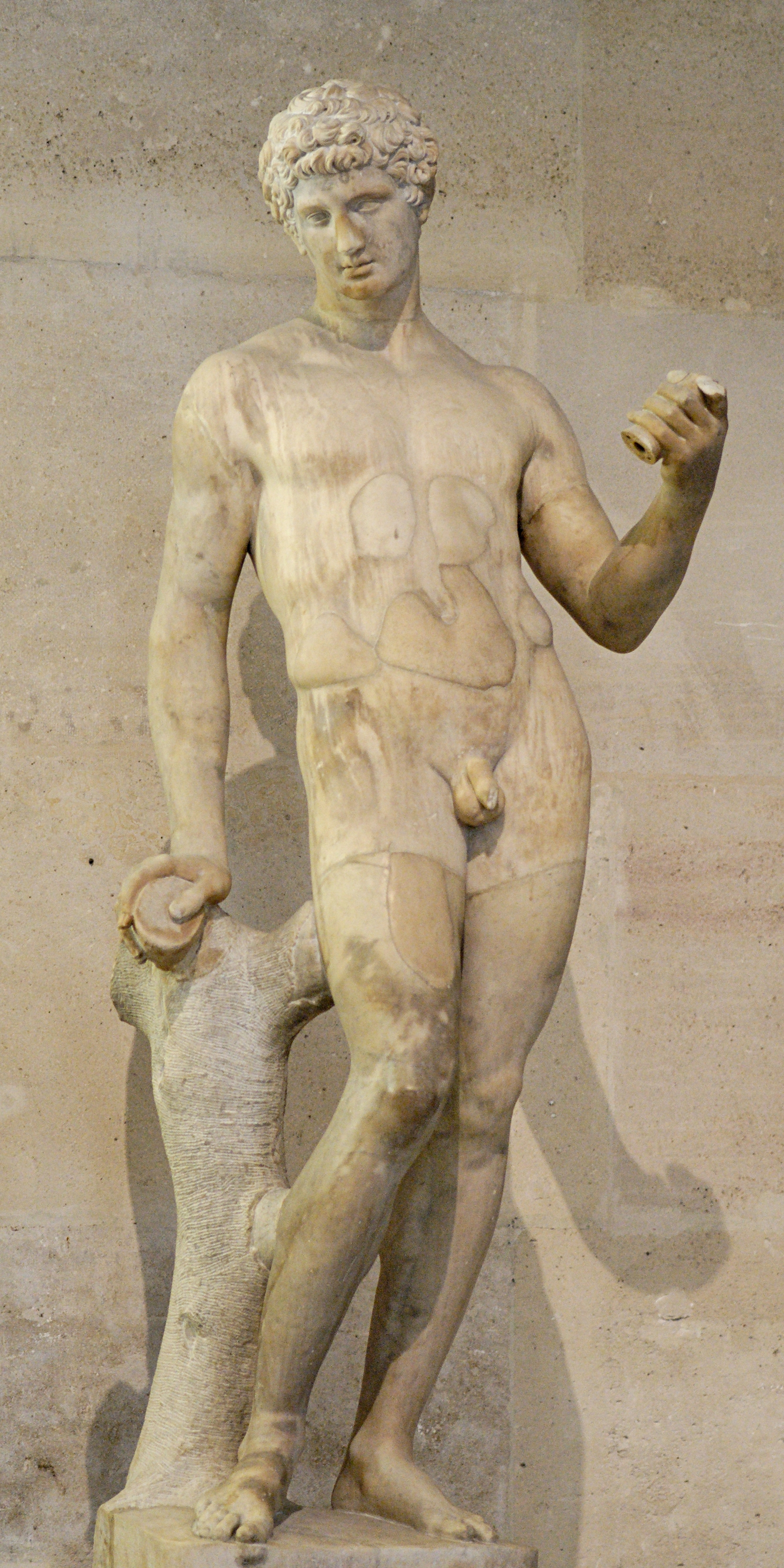
Adonis, a Roman torso, restored and completed by François Duquesnoy (Louvre Museum)

== Other works ==
Poussin recommended Duquesnoy to Cardinal Richelieu, who offered the position of royal sculptor to Louis XIII and with the goal of founding a royal academy of sculpture in Paris. Duquesnoy was about to sail from Livorno, when he died; he had suffered for years from gout and episodes of vertigo (he fell from the scaffolding while attaching the gilded palm branch to his Susanna) and bouts of depression. His brother, Jérôme Duquesnoy the Younger (1612–1654) inherited the chests with the designs of uncompleted work, including some designs for putti for the tomb of Bishop Triest in the Saint Bavo Cathedral in Ghent.

Like other sculptors working in 17th century Rome, Duquesnoy was called upon to restore and complete antiquities, for headless torsos rarely found a market with contemporary connoisseurs. With the Rondanini Faun (1625–30; now in the British Museum) Duquesnoy amplified a torso into a characteristically Baroque expansive gesture that deeply satisfied contemporary taste but was bitterly criticised by Neoclassicists by the end of the 18th century. He completed a Roman torso as Adonis. It found its way into the collection of Cardinal Mazarin and is now in the Louvre.

There are bronze busts of the Susanna in Vienna, Berlin, and Copenhagen. Finely finished small-scale bronzes of antique subjects, suitable for collectors, occupied the sculptor and his studio assistants. A Mercury and Cupid is at the Louvre, a gracile Bacchus at the Hermitage Museum. A bronze Mercury was commissioned by the collector of antiquities Vincenzo Giustiniani as a pendant to a Hellenistic bronze Hercules in his collection, a compliment to Duquesnoy and implicitly a statement of the parity of the Ancients and the Moderns. Giustiniani commissioned a life-size Virgin and Child from Duquesnoy in 1622, at a moment when the sculptor was hard pressed to finish his Andrew, due to interruption of payments instigated by a cabal (Joachim von Sandrart). His terracotta modelli were more likely to carry the immediacy of the sculptor's touch and were of especial value to other sculptors, if they could afford them. Louis XIV's royal sculptor François Girardon owned a great number of Duquesnoy's terra-cotta models, which are recorded in the inventory of Girardon's collection drawn up after his death in 1715.

== Bas-reliefs of putti ==
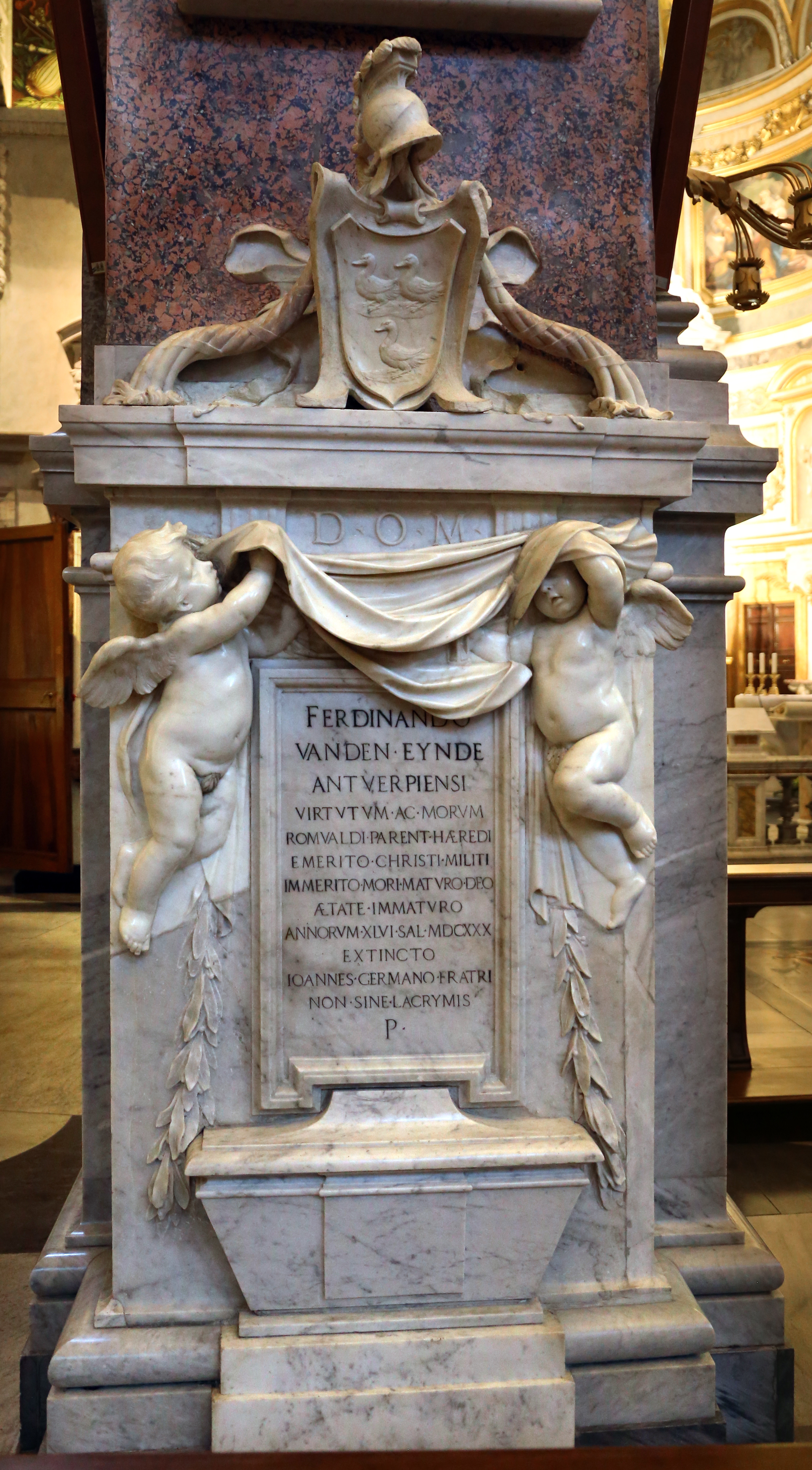
Tomb of Ferdinand van den Eyndein Santa Maria dell'Anima in Rome

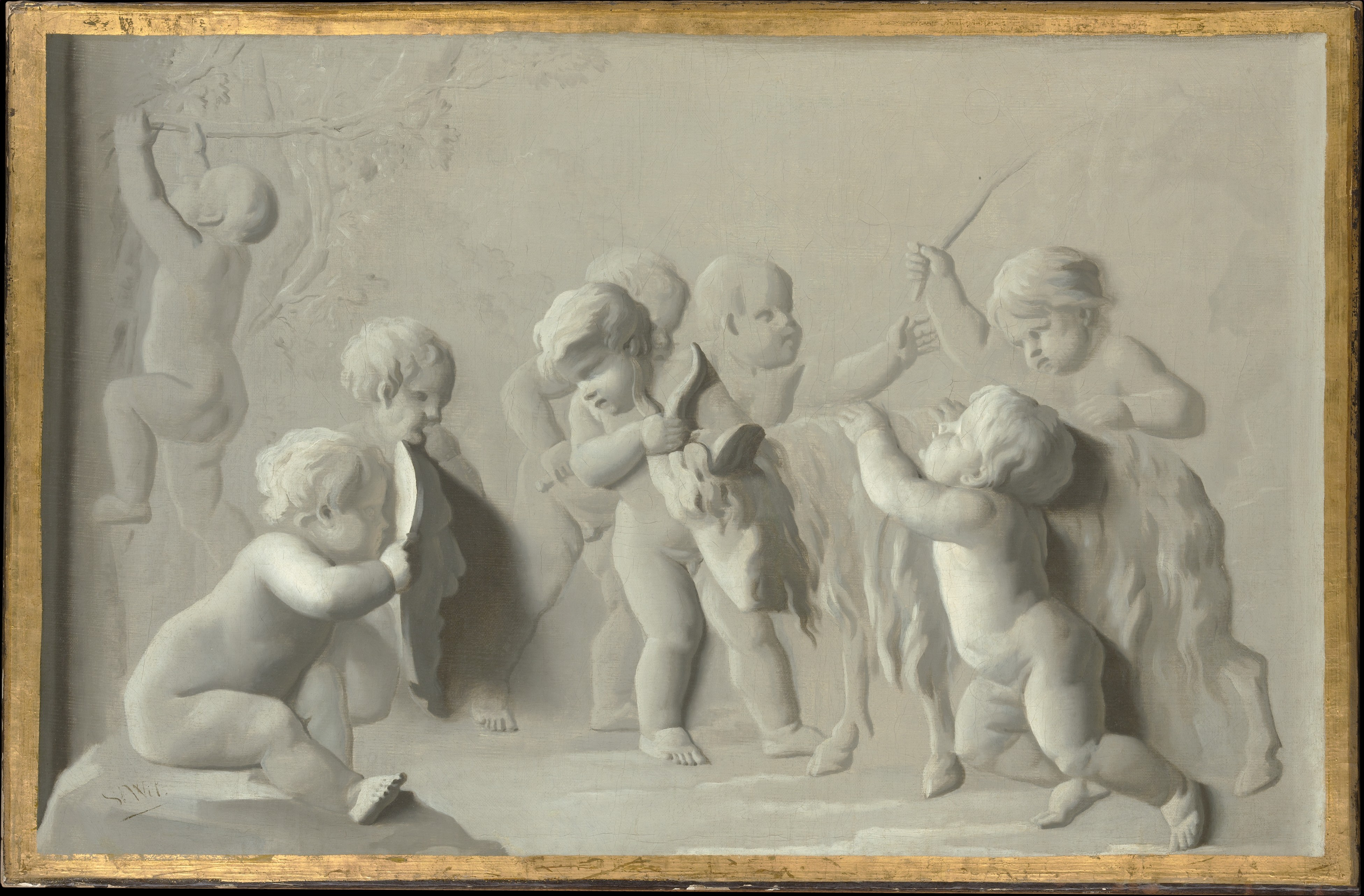
Children Playing with a Goat is one of several copies after his bas-relief of putti playing with a he-goat, which became quite popular with Dutch artists.

His characteristic putti, plump, with carefully observed children's heads, helped to establish the conventional type, familiar in the paintings of Rubens: in fact Rubens wrote Duquesnoy in 1640 to thank him for sending him casts of the putti from the sculptor's Tomb of Ferdinand van den Eynde in Santa Maria dell'Anima in Rome.

Flemish boxwood or ivory carvings, especially with scenes of putti, are often casually described as "in his manner", though he never left Rome.

Aside from his brother, who collaborated with him in his studio, his most prominent pupils were François Dieussart and Artus Quellinus. Quellinus and Rombaut Pauwels, another Flemish sculptor who familiarized himself with Duquesnoy's style in Rome, brought the classicly styled Baroque style of what Duquesnoy's circle, an informal academy, called la gran maniera greca to the Netherlands on their return from Rome. In Rome, Duquesnoy's student Orfeo Boselli wrote Osservazioni della scoltura antica in the 1650s; his observations reflected connoisseurship of the subtle contours of superior Greek sculpture, considered superior to Roman work, which had been developed in Duquesnoy's circle and would inform the sensibility of Winckelmann and Neoclassicism.

== Sources ==
- "Duquesnoy, François". Benezit Dictionary of Artists. 2011.
