= Giovanni Pietro Bellori =

Italian painter (1613–1696)

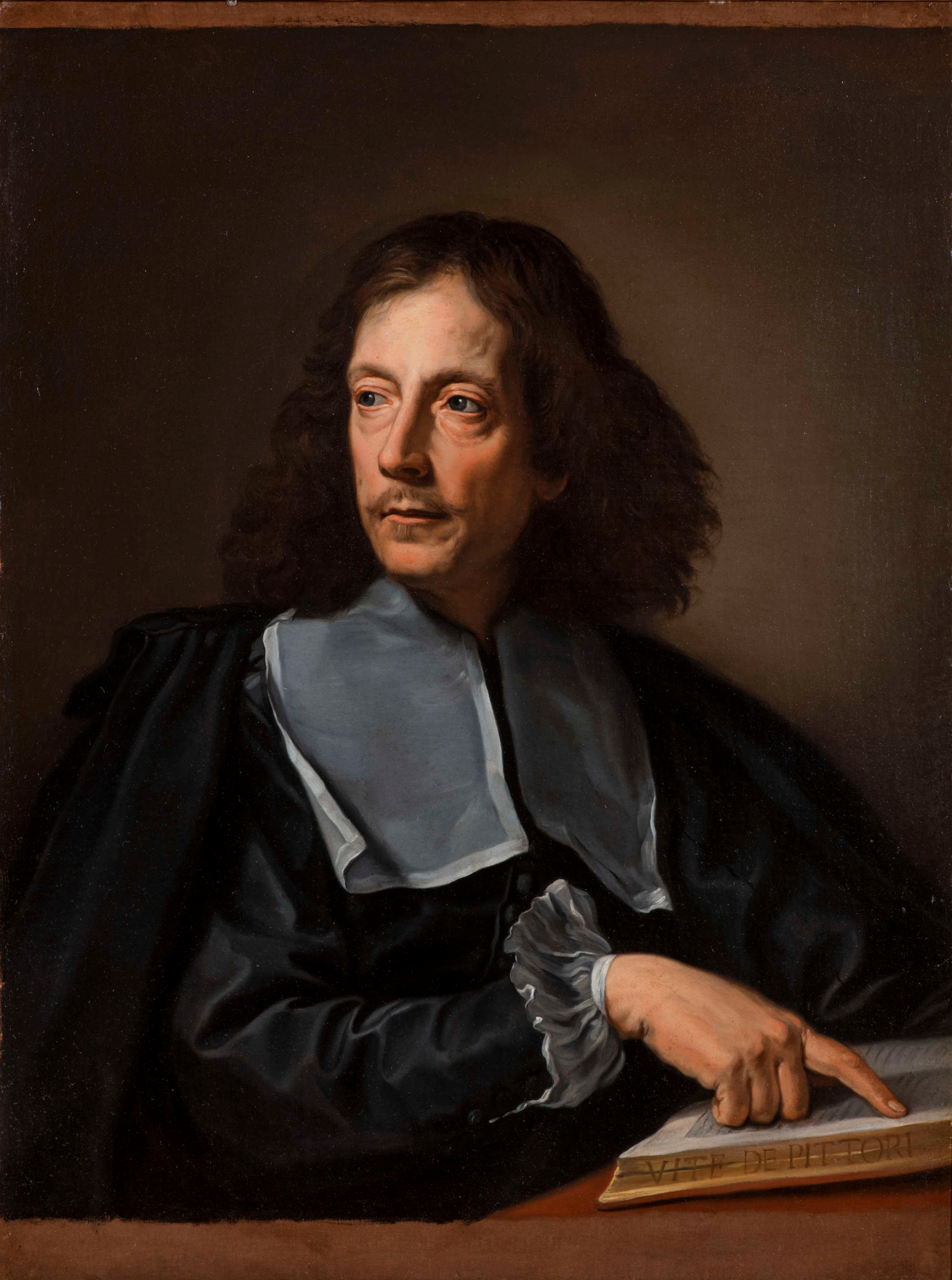
- Gian Pietro Bellori, portrait by Carlo Maratta
- Born: January 15, 1613; Rome, Papal States
- Died: February 19, 1696 (aged 83); Rome, Papal States
- Resting place: Church of S. Isidoro
- Occupations: Biographer, painter, librarian, art historian, historian, archaeologist
- Known for: Contribution to the rise of the neoclassical movement
- Parent(s): Giacomo Bellori and Artemetia Bellori (née Giannotti)

Academic background
- Influences: Plato; Aristotle; Alberti; Vasari; Angeloni; Baglione; Agucchi

Academic work
- Discipline: Classical archaeology, art history, aesthetics
- Notable works: Lives of the Artists
- Influenced: Dryden; Aglionby; Winckelmann; Schlosser; Baeumler; Panofsky

Giovanni Pietro Bellori (15 January 1613 – 19 February 1696), also known as Giovan Pietro Bellori or Gian Pietro Bellori, was an Italian art theorist, painter and antiquarian, who is best known for his work Lives of the Artists, considered the seventeenth-century equivalent to Vasari's Vite. His Vite de' Pittori, Scultori et Architetti Moderni, published in 1672, was influential in consolidating and promoting the theoretical case for classical idealism in art. As an art historical biographer, he favoured classicising artists rather than Baroque artists to the extent of omitting some of the key artistic figures of 17th-century art altogether.

== Biography ==
Bellori was born in Rome on 15 January 1613, the purported son of Giacomo, a farmer. He was reared and educated by his mother's employer (and more probable biological father), Francesco Angeloni, who was an antiquarian, writer of comedies, dialogues and operas, a numismatist (Historia Augusta, 1641) and collector of art, antiquities and natural history (he had Correggio, Bassano and Titian among his paintings). Angeloni fostered in Bellori an interest in collecting and interpreting antiquities, and indeed his interest in the antique was pivotal to his whole career. On his death in 1652, Angeloni designated Bellori as his sole heir, but the will was invalidated by Angeloni's brothers, who sold off most of the collection, leaving Bellori with the house on the Pincio, located on the via Orsina near the church of Sant'Isidoro, where he had grown up and in which he lived all his life.

Bellori had been keenly interested in art since childhood. As a young man, he took art lessons from the painter Domenichino. Philip Skippon, who visited Bellori in 1665, noted, "he draws pictures and makes good landskips", and as late as 1689 when Bellori was admitted to the French Academy he was listed as a painter. He became a member of the Accademia di San Luca by 1652 and was Secretary 1652–3, 1666, and 1668–72. Bellori was a close friend of many artists, including Nicolas Poussin, Giovanni Angelo Canini, François Duquesnoy, Charles Alphonse du Fresnoy and Carlo Maratta.

In the spring of 1661 he accompanied the representative of Louis XIV in Rome, M. Parisot on a long trip through Southern Italy. He became a member of the French Academy in 1689.

He was appointed Commissario delle Antichità by Pope Clement X on 31 May 1670. Bellori was librarian and antiquarian to Queen Christina of Sweden from 1677 to 1689. While serving Christina, he certainly met Filippo Baldinucci, the Florentine writer on art, who visited Rome in 1681 on the occasion of the Queen's commission to him for a biography of Gian Lorenzo Bernini.

By 1695 Bellori was very ill, suffering especially in his lower legs, and had not left his house since mid 1694. He died on 19 February 1696, and was buried in the Church of S. Isidoro.

Bellori lived on the Pincian Hill near S. Isidoro, where he rebuilt the dispersed collection of Angeloni. Travellers' diaries and guidebooks confirm that Bellori had assembled a small but well-chosen gallery, with works attributed to Titian, Tintoretto, Van Dyck, Maratta and Annibale Carracci, amongst others. After his death, his collection was purchased by Frederick I of Prussia and Augustus III of Saxony. Bellori's collection of ancient gems and medals found their way to Dresden where they helped shape J.J. Winckelmann's vision of antiquity.

The famous French antiquarian Jacob Spon, who met Bellori in Rome in 1675, considered him «très savant en toutes sortes d'antiquités». According to another famous visitor, Bishop Gilbert Burnet, «Bellori is deservedly famous for his knowledge of the Greek and Egyptian antiquities and for all that belongs to the mythologies and superstitions of the Heathens». Burnet included him in a list of the most learned men he met in Rome: Raffaello Fabretti, Honoré Fabri, Francesco Nazzari, Cardinal César d'Estrées, Cardinal Philip Howard and Ludovico Maracci.

Bellori was one of the most important intellectuals of seventeenth-century Italy. He was the author of several learned archeological treatises, widely respected by later antiquarians and reprinted in great part in the Thesaurus of Graevius and Gronovius. His Nota dei Musei (1664) catalogued private and ecclesiastical libraries and collections in Rome and included the first detailed study of ancient painting. His poem 'On Painting' was published in 1642 to introduce Baglione's 'Lives'. Bellori's own Vite ('Lives', 1672) — a basic source for the history of 17th-century art — includes a selection of artists, on whom he had been collecting material from the 1640s. Some are Roman and others claimed for the Roman school, and the biographies are introduced by a scholarly apologia on idealization. His friend Carlo Maratta contributed funds for the posthumous publication of Bellori's Descrizzione delle imagini dipinte de Raffaelle d'Urbino (1696), which describes Raphael Rooms in the Apostolic Palace and the Loggia of Cupid and Psyche in the Villa Farnesina.

== Works ==
In 1664 Bellori delivered an influential speech to the Accademia di San Luca on the Ideal in Art. In 1672 he published this as a preface to his biographies of recent and contemporary artists, entitled: Le vite de’ pittori, scultori et architetti moderni (The lives of the modern painters, sculptors, and architects). Since then it has acquired almost canonical status as one of the earliest declarations of the principles of Classicism.

Bellori's Lives of the Artists is one of the foundational texts of the history and criticism of European art. It covers the brothers Annibale Carracci and Agostino Carracci, Domenico Fontana, Federico Barocci, Michelangelo Merisi da Caravaggio, Rubens, Anthony van Dyck, Francois Duquesnoy, Domenico Zampieri (il Domenichino), Giovanni Lanfranco, Alessandro Algardi and Nicolas Poussin. Bellori planned a work on Bolognese artists, but, only completed entries for Guido Reni, Andrea Sacchi and Carlo Maratta. The life of Maratta was published in 1732 and the three biographies together, edited from his manuscript, in 1942.

== Views ==
In Bellori's view, the Renaissance ideal had been rescued from the tangled post-Raphael and Michelangelo styles now known as Mannerism, by the robust classicism of those following Annibale Carracci's lead. Bellori advocated idealism over realism or naturalism. This famously led to Bellori's reverence of the painting of Annibale Carracci and repudiation of Caravaggio. His writing of the 'Idea' is influenced by Giovanni Battista Agucchi, Vasari, Leon Battista Alberti, Aristotle and others. In Bellori's Lives the artists he most admired were Domenichino and Nicolas Poussin; his friend the sculptor Alessandro Algardi was praised while Bernini was not mentioned. Bellori included the painters Andrea Sacchi and his pupil Carlo Maratta, however, he omitted Pietro da Cortona. Bellori often relied for his facts on the earlier biographies of Roman artists by Giovanni Baglione.

Vasari's definition of disegno or design, at that time seen as the most important artistic element, is tied up in the concept of 'prudence'. An artist's work could essentially be seen as a series of choices, and the wisdom of these choices was owed to the character or 'prudence' of the artist. This forms the basis of subsequent value judgments in art by Bellori and his contemporaries. Bellori and Agucchi, after Aristotle, equated the practice of idealism with prudent choice, and naturalism with poor prudence.

== Archaeological work ==
By the late 1660s Bellori assisted Leonardo Agostini in his duties as papal Commissario delle Antichità (contributing much of the commentary to Agostini's gem collection), and in 1670 he took up the post himself, holding it for the next 24 years while undertaking an astonishing programme of further publications. These were at first sponsored by Cardinal Massimo, one on the Severan Marble Plan (1673), perhaps illustrated by himself, and one on Massimo's coin collection (1676). After Massimo's death in 1677, Bellori went on to catalogue rare coins in Cardinal Gaspare Carpegna's library, and then those belonging to Queen Christina of Sweden, for whom he also served as antiquario. In collaboration with the printer Giovanni Giacomo de Rossi and the painter-engraver Pietro Santi Bartoli (1635–1700), who had also worked for Massimo, he produced a hugely successful series of corpora, illustrated by Bartoli's engravings. An edition of prints of ancient bas-reliefs had already appeared by 1677, to be followed by the Column of Marcus Aurelius and its reliefs in 1679, the paintings in the Tomb of the Nasonii on the Via Flaminia, discovered in 1674 (published 1680), the triumphal arches of Rome in 1690, ancient funerary lamps in 1691-8 and ancient burials in 1697.

Bellori was an exceptional antiquario by any definition. Unlike him, most seventeenth-century antiquari published nothing, and when they did, like Agostini, it was usually a promotional catalogue of their own collection or just one or two items from it. Ménestrier's one published work, a study of the image Ephesian Diana, based on examples in his own collection appeared close to twenty years after his death, also benefiting from Bellori's ministrations.

== List of works ==
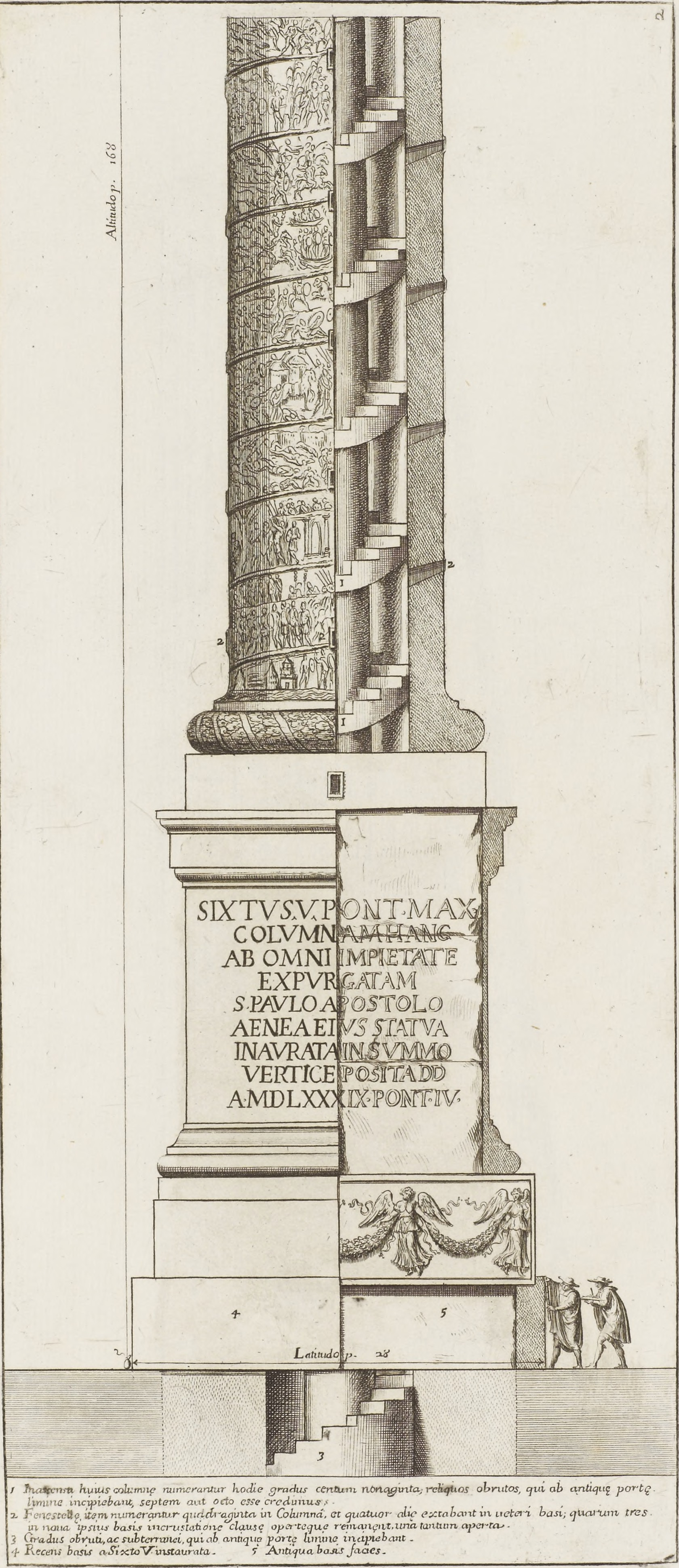
Columna Cochlis M. Aurelio Antonino Augusto dicata, Rome 1704.

- Giovanni Pietro Bellori, Icones et segmenta illustrium e marmore tabularum quae Romae adhuc extant a Francisco Perrier delineata..., Parisiis 1645.
- Giovanni Pietro Bellori, Il Bonino, ovvero avvertimenti al Tristano intorno agli errori nelle medaglie del primo tomo de' suoi Commentari historici, s.l. c. 1649 (difesa dell'Angeloni attaccato per la Historia Augusta)
- Giovanni Pietro Bellori, Notae in numismata tum Ephesia, tum aliarum urbium apibus insignita, Romae 1658 (rist. con Expositio symbolici deae Syriae simulacri, in Claude-François Menestrier, Symbolica Dianae Ephesiae statua, Romae 1660 e 1688, e in Jakob Gronovius, Thesaurus graecarum antiquitatum, VII, Venetiis 1735).
- Giovanni Pietro Bellori; Pietro Santi Bartoli (1667). Colonna Traiana eretta dal senato, e popolo romano all'imperatore Traiano Augusto nel suo foro in Roma. Scolpita con l'historie della guerra dacica la prima e la seconda espeditione, e vittoria contro il re Decebalo. Nuovamente disegnata, et intagliata da Pietro Santi Bartoli. Con l'espositione latina d'Alfonso Ciaccone, compendiata nella vulgare lingua sotto ciascuna immagine, accresciuta di medaglie, inscrittioni, e trofei, da Gio. Pietro Bellori. Rome: Giovanni Giacomo de Rossi.
- Bellori, Giovanni Pietro (1672). Vite de' Pittori, Scultori et Architetti Moderni, Parte Prima. Rome: Mascardi.
- Giovanni Pietro Bellori (1673). Fragmenta vestigii veteris Romae ex lapidibus Farnesianis: Nunc primum in Iucem edita cum notis Io. Petri Bellorii (in Latin). Rome: typis Iosephi Corvi, sumptibus Ioannis Iacobi de Rubeis.
- Giovanni Pietro Bellori e Pietro Santi Bartoli, Columna Antoniniana Marci Aurelii Antonini Augusti Rebus Gestis Insignis: Germanis Simul, Et Sarmatis, Gemino Bello Devictis Ex S. C. Romae In Antonini Foro, Ad Via[m] Flaminia[m], Erecta, Ac Utriusqve Belli Imaginibus Anaglyphice Insculpta Nunc Primum A Petro Sancti Bartolo, Iuxta Delineationes In Bibliotheca Barberina Asservatas, A Se Cum Antiquis Ipsius Columnae Signis Collatas, Aere Incisa Et In Lucem Edita, Cum Notis Excerptis Ex Declaralionibus Io. Petri Bellorii. Rome 1675.
- Imagines veterum philosophorum (Rome 1685).
- Francesco Angeloni (1685). Giovanni Pietro Bellori (ed.). La Historia Augusta Da Giulio Cesare infino a Costantino il Magno. Illustrata Con la verità delle Antiche Medaglie (2 ed.). a spese di Felice Cesaretti libraro all'Insegna della Regina.
- Giovanni Pietro Bellori; Pietro Santi Bartoli (1690). Veteres Arcus Augustorum triumphis insignes ex reliquiis quae Romae adhuc supersunt, cum imaginibus triumphalibus restituti, antiquis nummis notisque I. Petri Bellorii illustrati (in Latin). Romae: Ad templum Sanctae Mariae de Pace.
- Giovanni Pietro Bellori; Pietro Santi Bartoli (1691). Le antiche lucerne sepolcrali figurate raccolte dalle caue sotterranee, e grotte di Roma, nelle quali si contengono molte erudite memorie disegnate, ed intagliate nelle loro forme da Pietro Santi Bartoli divise in tre parti con l'osservationi di Gio. Pietro Bellori. Rome: nella stamperia di Gio. Francesco Buagni. This work was translated into Latin by Alexander Duker, and published at Leyden, 1702, fol.
- Giovanni Pietro Bellori; Pietro Santi Bartoli (1693). Admiranda Romanarum antiquitatum ac veteris sculpturae vestigia : anaglyphico opere elaborata ex marmoreis exemplaribus quae Romae adhuc extant in Capitolio, aedibus hortisque virorum principum ad antiquam elegantiam a Petro Sancti Bartolo delineata, incisa. In quibus plurima ac praeclarissima ad Romanam historiam, veteres mores dignoscendos, ob oculos ponuntur. Notis Io. Petri Bellorii illustrata (in Latin). Romae: sumptibus ac typis edita a Joanne Jacobo de Rubeis.
- Pietro Santi Bartoli, Giovanni Pietro Bellori, Gli antichi sepolcri overo mausolei romani... trovati in... Roma... Roma: Antonio de Rossi, 1699. This work was translated into Latin by Alexander Duker, and published at Leyden, 1702, fol.
- Michel-Ange de La Chausse; Pietro Sante Bartoli; Giovanni Pietro Bellori; Francesco Bartoli (1738). Picturae antiquae cryptarum romanarum et sepulcri Nasonum (in Latin). Roma: ex typographia S. Michaelis ad Ripam.
