= Apollo and Cupid =

Bronze statue by François Duquesnoy

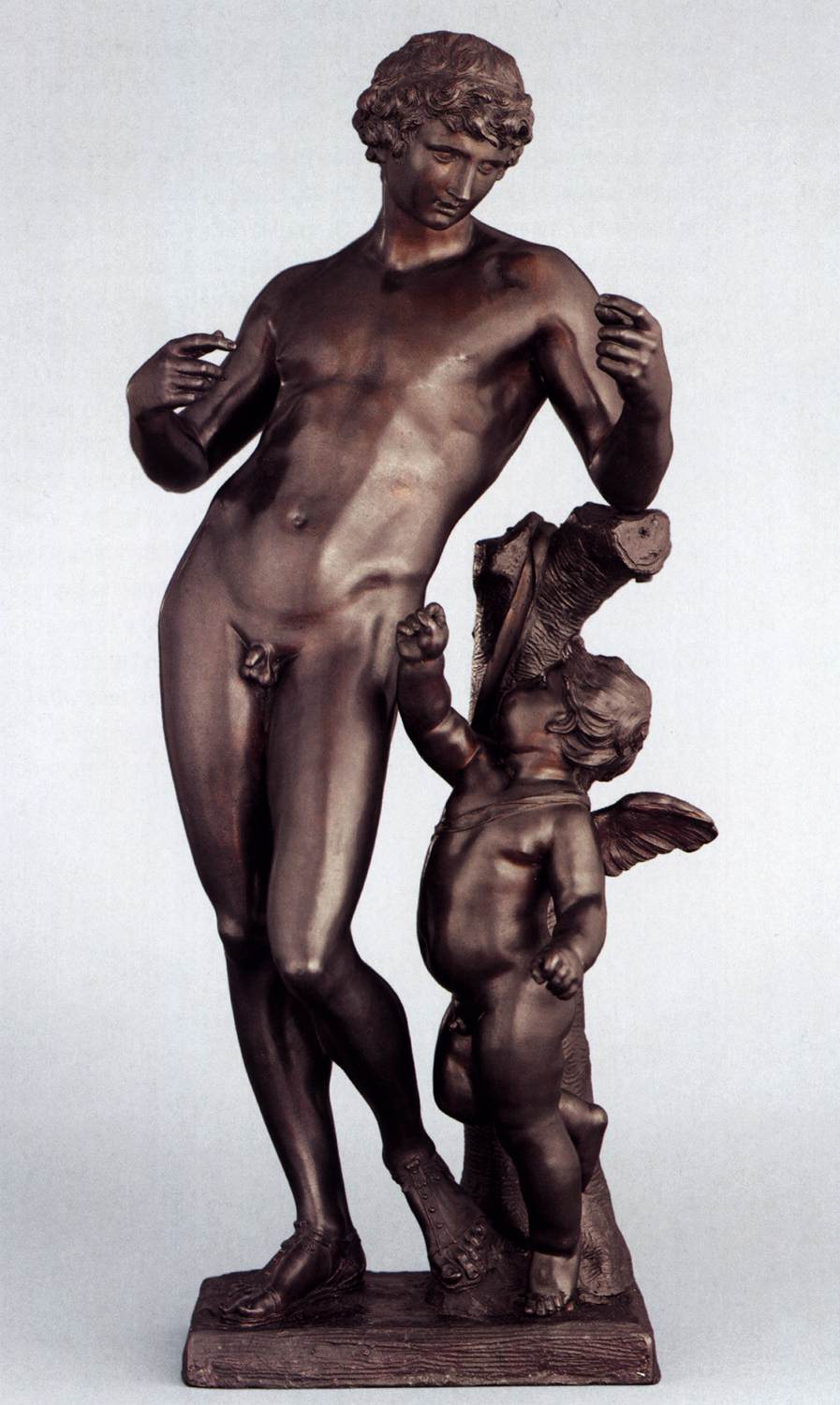
- Artist: François Duquesnoy
- Year: 1630s
- Type: Sculpture
- Medium: Bronze
- Subject: Apollo
- Dimensions: 66 cm (26 in)
- Location: Liechtenstein Museum; Vienna; 48°13′21″N 16°21′34″E

Apollo and Cupid is a bronze sculpture of the Greek god Apollo flanked by an amorino by the Flemish sculptor François Duquesnoy. Just like Duquesnoy's Mercury (whose putto is now lost) the statue was designed as a dialogue between a Greek god and a putto / Cupid. The sculpture has been described as more classicist when compared to the Mercury, with Apollo's feminine facial features akin to those of Duquesnoy's Saint Susanna, and the "vigorously molded" Cupid quite close to Duquesnoy's masterpiece, the putti adorning the Tomb of Ferdinand van den Eynde. Both the Mercury and Apollo and Cupid are currently housed at the private Liechtenstein Museum in Vienna.

== Sculpture ==
According to Bellori, whilst this bronze is indeed a pendant to Duquesnoy's Mercury, it was designed several years later by the Fiammingo. Indeed, the sculpture was not realized for Vincenzo Giustiniani (the Greek sculpture enthusiast who had commissioned the Mercury from Duquesnoy) but for another patron. Further, a different dating for the two sculptures is suggested by stylistic differences. Duquesnoy's Apollo and Cupid is first recorded in and inventory of Karl Eusebius, Prince of Liechtenstein at Feldsberg. It has been suggested that Karl Eusebius commissioned this oeuvre himself.

The subject of the sculpture has been determined to be Apollo instructing Cupid how to shoot an arrow, with Cupid depicted while imitating him. The god leans on a tree stump, "in a graceful contrapposto that echoes that of the Mercury, but without its backward tilt." Apollo originally held a bow in his left hand. With his right hand, Apollo instructs Cupid to extract a bow from his quiver. According to the Liechtenstein Museum Press, "Duquesnoy gave his figures a softly chased surface and a subtle modulation that creates a gentle interplay of light and shade."

Together with the Mercury, the bronze was greatly admired by Austrian sculptor Georg Rafael Donner, who copied Duquesnoy's bronzes. Duquesnoy's authorship was forgotten in the eighteenth century, and the work was thought to be an antique.

== Sources ==
- Fransolet, Mariette (1942). Francois du Quesnoy, sculpteur d'Urbain VIII, 1597–1643. Bruxelles, Belgium: Academie Royale de Belgique.
- Lingo, Estelle (2002). "The Greek Manner and a Christian "Canon": François Duquesnoy's "Saint Susanna"". The Art Bulletin. 84 (1). The Art Bulletin: 65–93. doi:10.2307/3177253. JSTOR 3177253.
- Lingo, Estelle Cecile (2007). François Duquesnoy and the Greek Ideal. New Haven, Connecticut: Yale University Press. ISBN 978-0-300-12483-5.
- Boudon-Machuel, Marion (2005). François Du Quesnoy. Paris, France: Arthena.
