= Nicolaas Rubens, Lord of Rameyen =

Flemish nobleman (1618–1655)

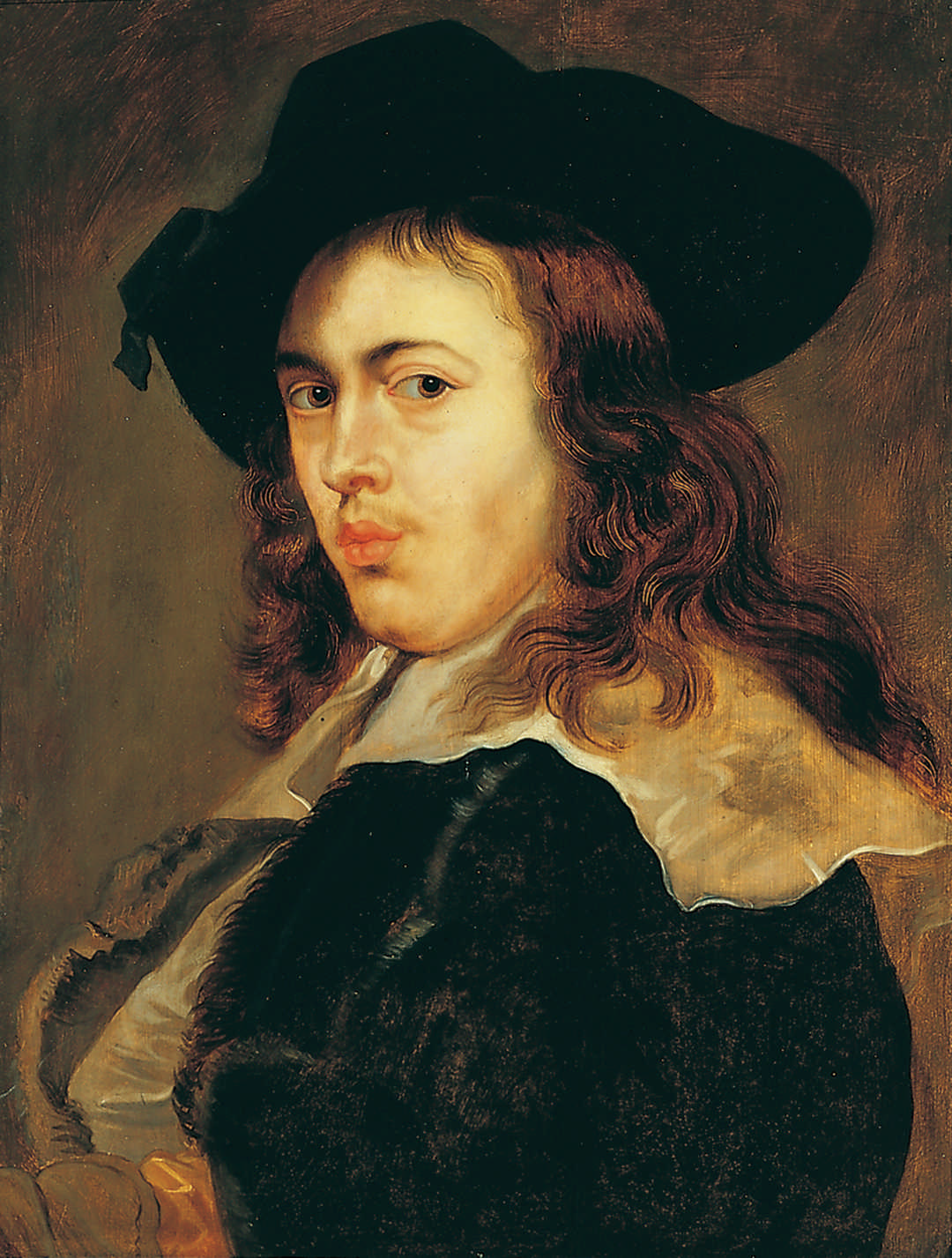
The Portrait of Nicolaas Rubens c. 1634–1636 by Peter Paul Rubens, Mimara Museum, Zagreb

Nicolaas Peter Paul Rubens, Lord of Rameyen (1618–1655) was a son of the painter Peter Paul Rubens and his first wife Isabella Brant.

== Family ==
Albert Rubens married Constantia Helman (1609–1678) in 1640, the daughter of Ferdinand Helman, an alderman of Antwerp and Catherina van der Veken, both of whom are buried in Saint James' Church in Antwerp.

Nicolaas Rubens, Lord of Rameyen

  - 1.0.0/ Albert Maria Rubens, Lord of Rameyen (1642–1672): alderman of Antwerp. marr. Catharina Vecquemans.
    - 1.1.0/ Maria Catharina Rubens (1672–1710): married to Alexander IV Goubau, Lord of Mespelaere, (1658–1712): Grand Almoner of Antwerp.
      - 1.1.1./ Georges Alexander Goubau, Lord of Mespelaer (1697–1760) : marr. Maria Bosschaert.
  - 2.0.0/Jan Nicolaas Rubens, Lord of Rameyen (1648–1713):
    marr. Cornelie Constantia Helman, daughter of the Lord of Waesbeeke.
    - 2.1.0/ Cornelia Paulina Philippine Rubens (1677–1738):
      married to Honore Henri, Count of Esbeke, Viscount de Haeghen, lord of Riviere d'Arschot, (1659–1739).
      - 2.1.1/ Nicolas Clement Honore van der Hagen, died 1729.
      - 2.1.2/ Constantia Honorine Theresia van der Hagen, Countess d'Esbeke, marr. Ferdinand Philippe de Vischer, Baron of Celles: Lord mayor of Brussels.
  - 3.0.0/ Theresia Constantia Rubens (1691–1764): marr. Eugene vander Dussen, Lord of Bornival and Baron of the Holy Roman Empire (1683–1745). Their branche has become extinct.

== Career ==
In Nicolaas' youth, his father made multiple painted and drawn portraits of Nicolaas, some of which he used as models for figures in his altarpieces.

In 1643 he bought the Heerlijkheid of Rameyen (or Ramay) with the fortune he inherited from his father. Rameyen Castle in the parish of Gestel was his main residence and he also died there. His secondary residence was Ursele Castle (also called Het Schoonbroekhof) near Ekeren, which he inherited from his father who had acquired it on 29 May 1627.

== Gallery ==
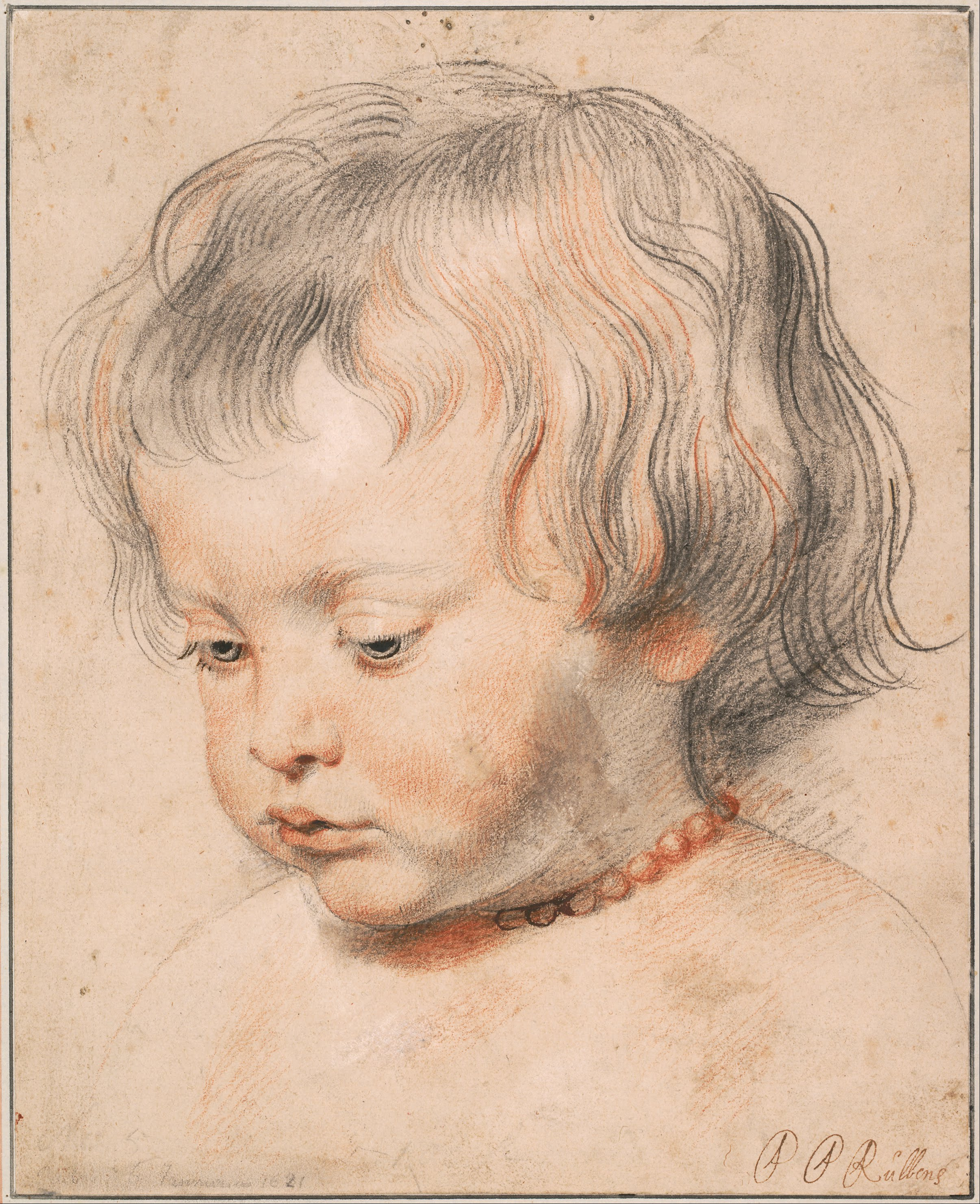
Nicolaas Rubens Wearing a Coral Neckless (c. 1619), Albertina

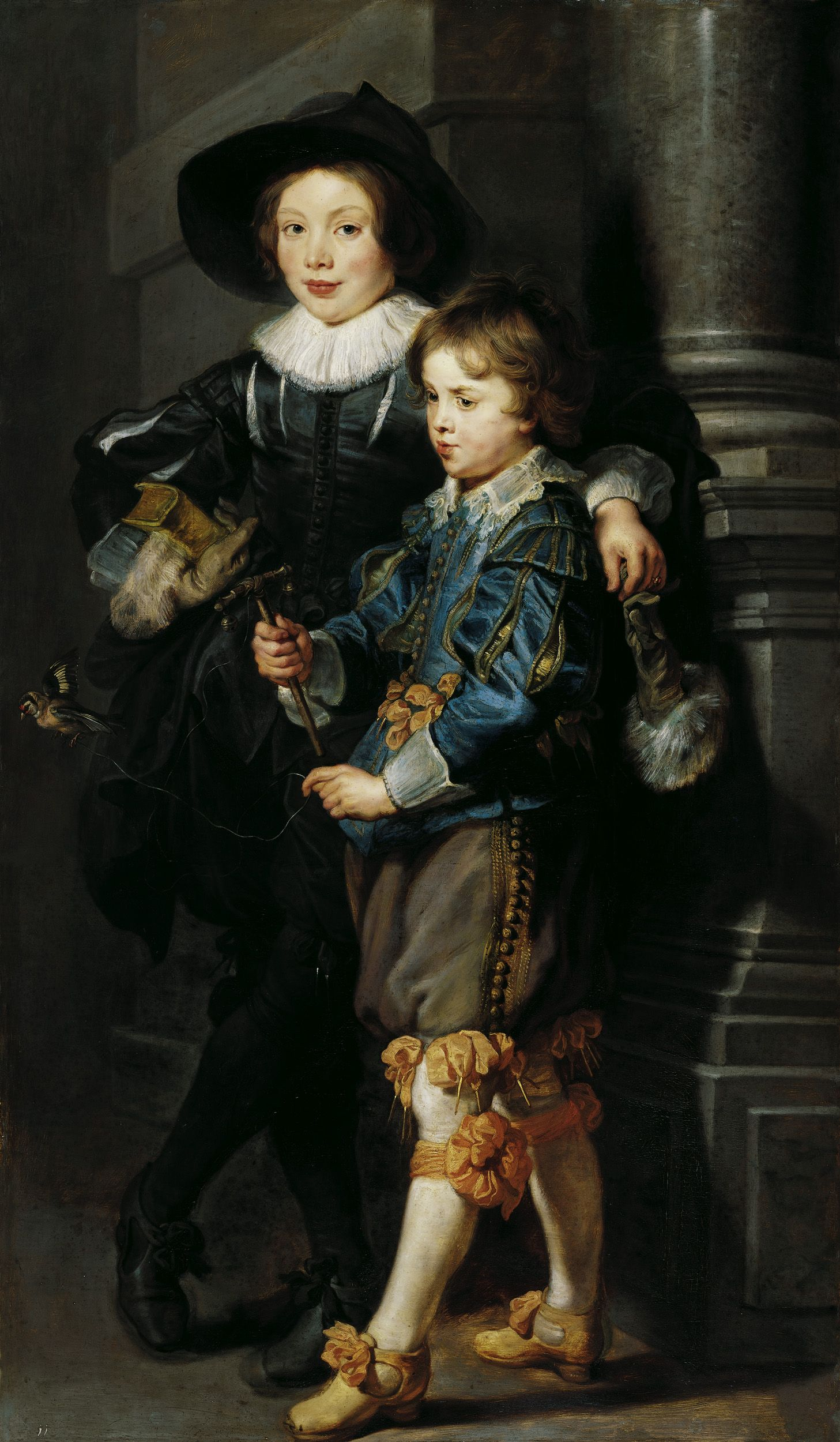
Portrait of Albert and Nicolaas Rubens c. 1626-1627, Gartenpalais Liechtenstein

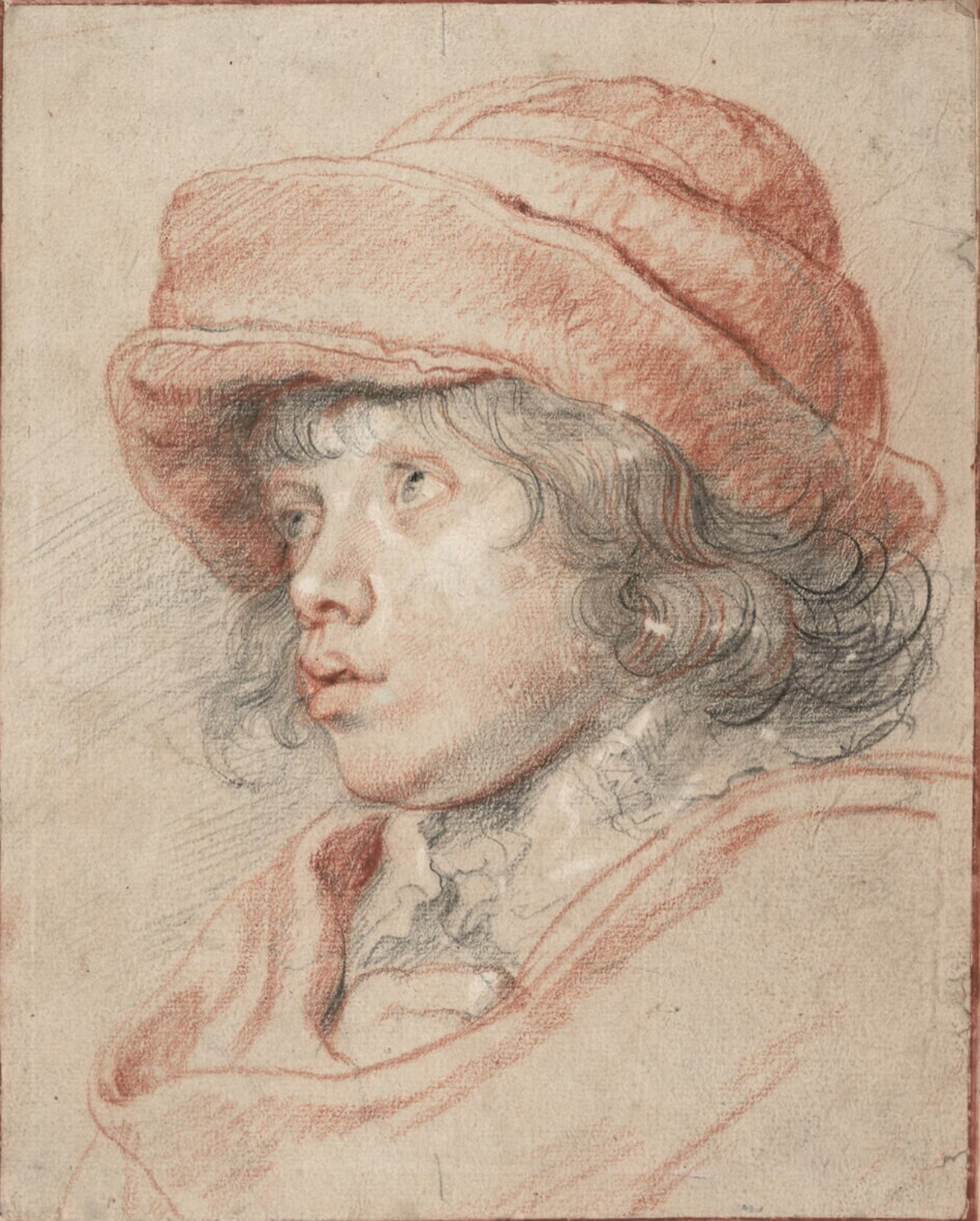
Portrait of Nicolaas Rubens, Son of the Artist, Wearing a Red Felt Cap, c. 1625-1627, Albertina

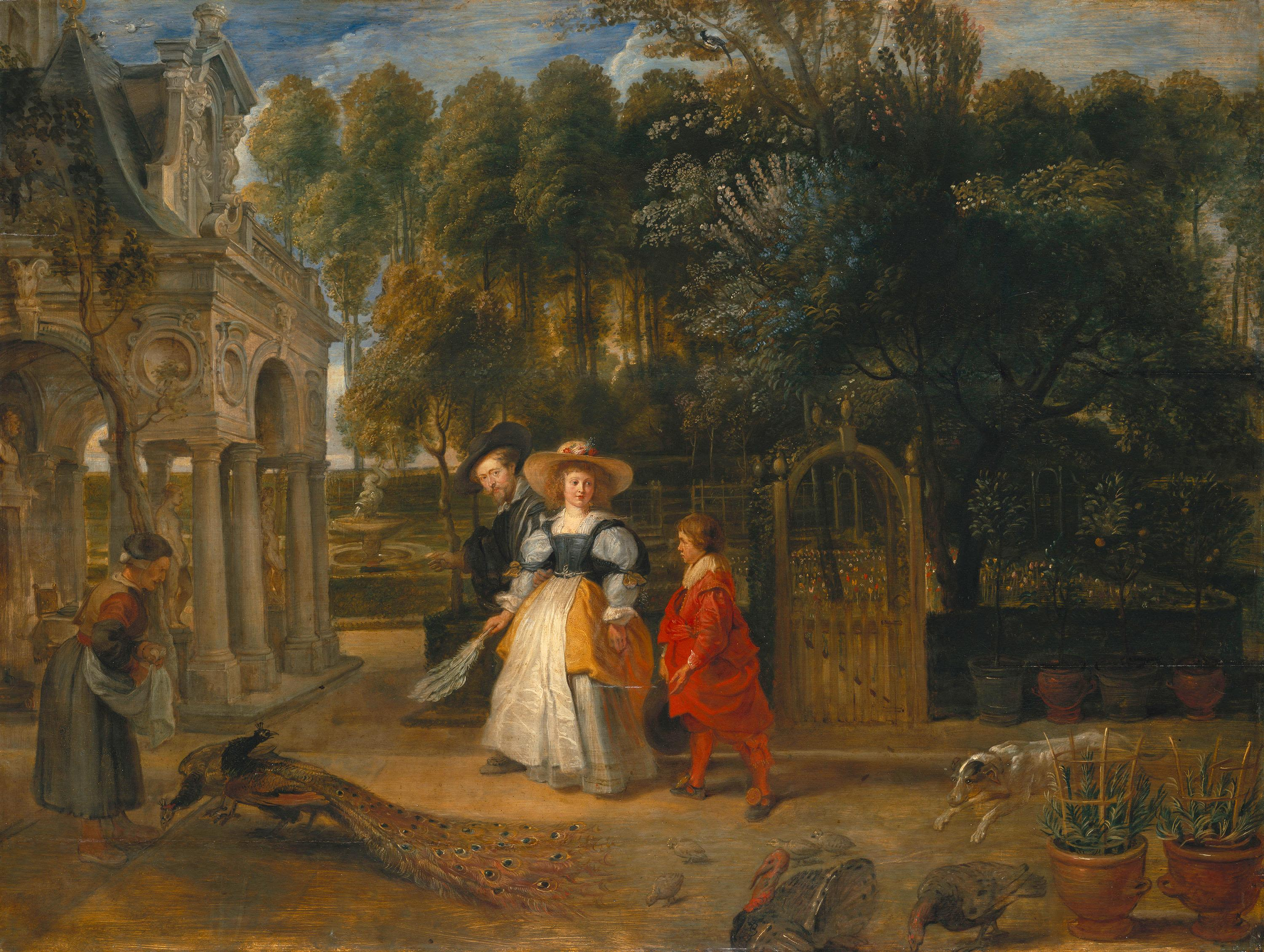
Rubens and his second wife in the garden c. 1640, Alte Pinakothek

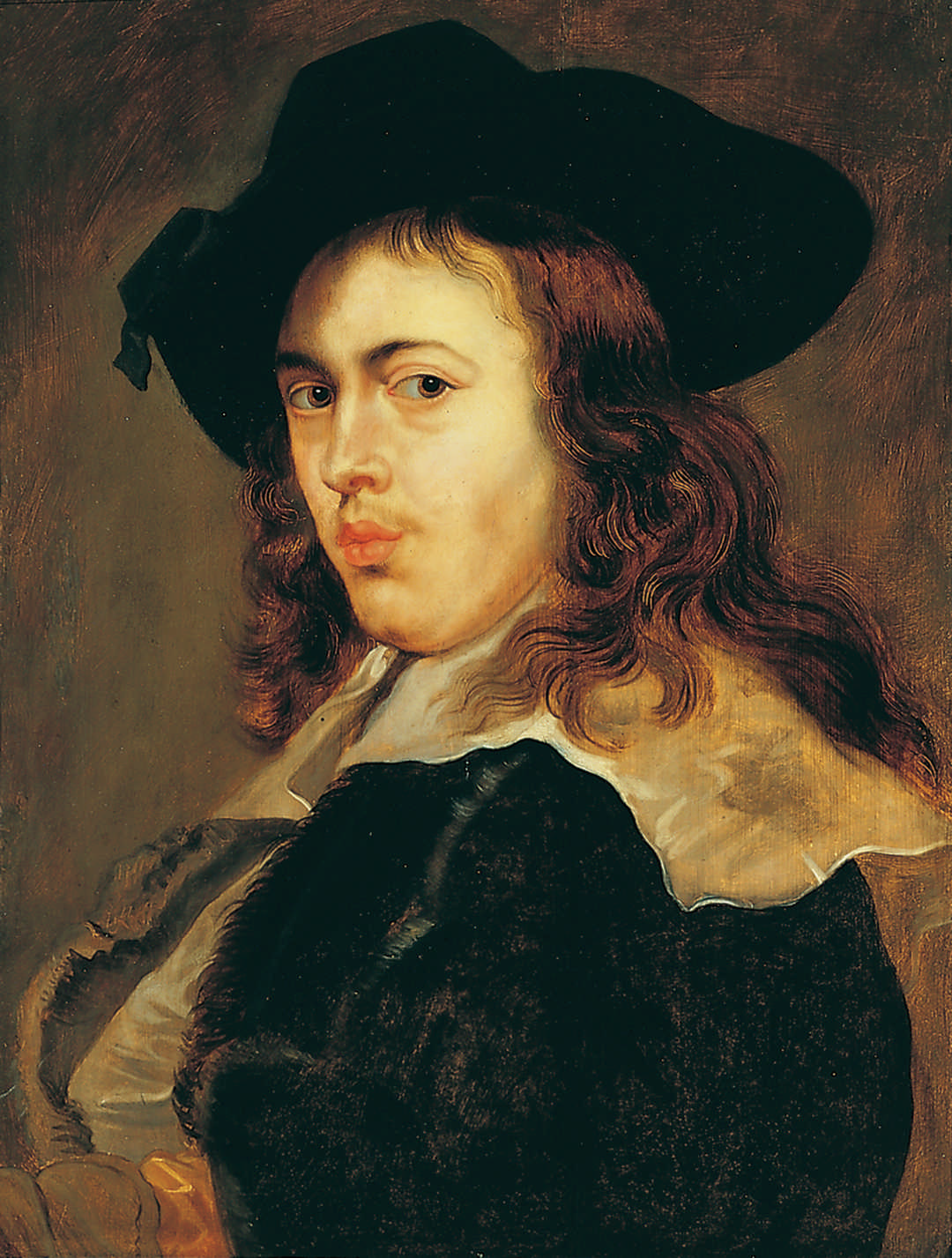
The Portrait of Nicolaas Rubens c. 1634–1636 Mimara Museum

== See also ==
- Rubens family
