= The Portrait of Nicolaas Rubens =

Painting by Peter Paul Rubens

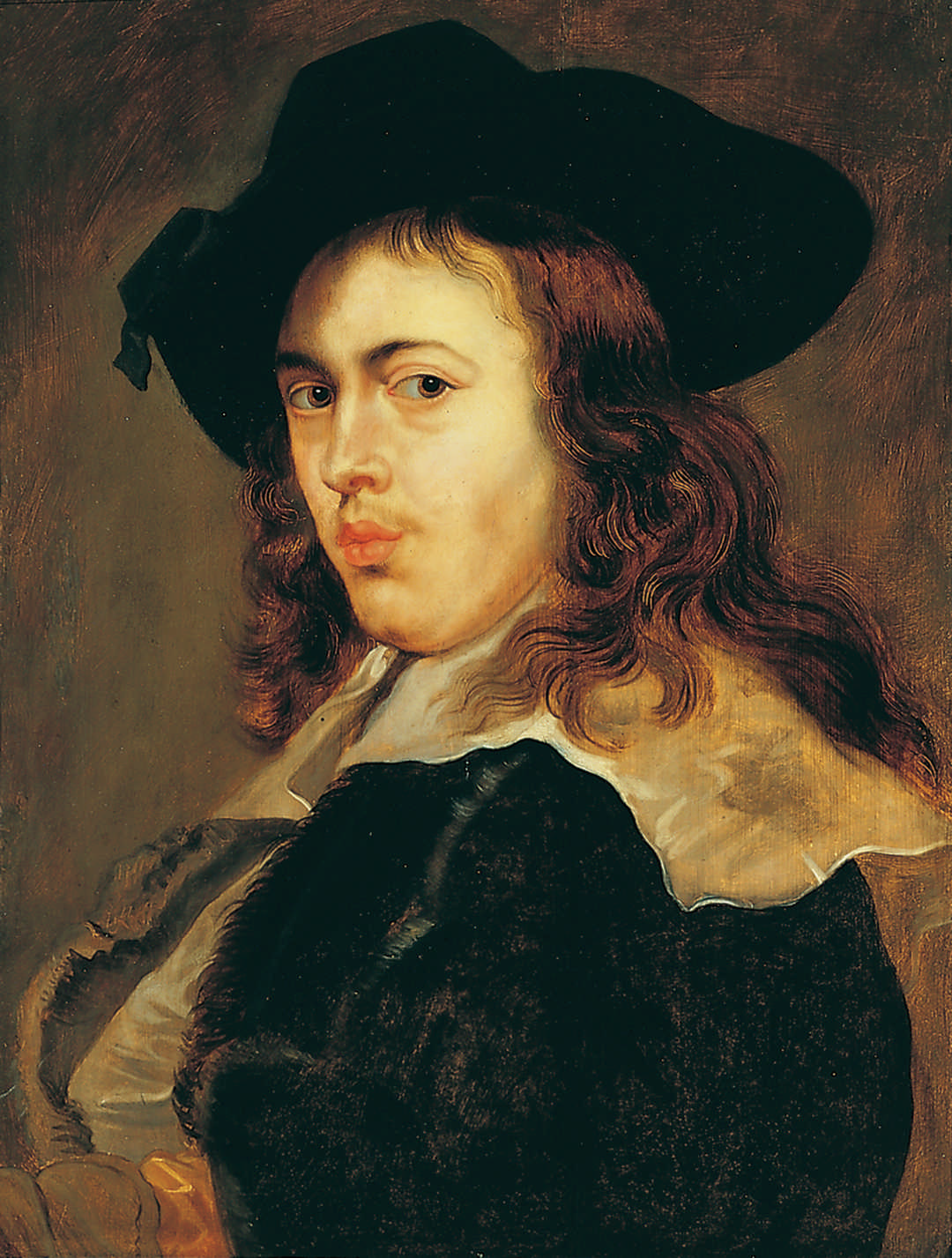
- Artist: Peter Paul Rubens
- Year: c. 1634–1636
- Medium: Oil on wood
- Movement: Baroque
- Subject: Nicolaas Rubens
- Dimensions: 60.3 cm × 45.5 cm (23.7 in × 17.9 in)
- Location: Mimara Museum, Zagreb

The Portrait of Nicolaas Rubens is a c. 1636 oil painting of Nicolaas Rubens, Lord of Rameyen by his father, Flemish master Peter Paul Rubens. It is currently held in the Mimara Museum in Zagreb, Croatia, having been donated by the museum's founder, Ante Topić Mimara, in 1973.

The portrait entered the Mimara Museum as part of the donation by Ante Topić Mimara in 1973. It was first exhibited in Zagreb in 1983, and in 1987 it became part of the museum's permanent collection. The ownership history prior to its inclusion in the collection is unknown.

== Description ==
The portrait is painted in c. 1634-1636, in oil on an oak panel measuring 60.3 × 45.5 cm. It has been restored several times. The painting depicts Peter Paul Rubens's son, Nicolaas (1618–1655) which he had with his wife Isabella Brant, as a young man in a three-quarter left profile. While the shoulders and chest are shown almost in profile, the head is slightly inclined forward, creating the impression of a sudden turn toward the viewer. The reverse has been parqueted. Within a rectangular field formed by the intersections of the parquet battens, the coat of arms of Antwerp is visible a castle with three towers, above which are two outstretched hands burned into the wood.

The figure is characterized by an elongated adolescent face, with a well-proportioned nose and a short yet firmly defined jaw and chin, accentuated by a noticeable double chin. Particular attention is drawn to the tall, slightly protruding and tense lips—somewhat irregular in form—above which a sparse moustache is visible. The hair, of a reddish-brown hue, is long and wavy, falling over the shoulders and back, in places transitioning into lighter, blond curls. The young man wears a broad-brimmed black hat adorned with a ribbon. His attire is likewise black: a fur-trimmed doublet over which lies a wide collar. In the lower left corner, a detail of a silk, golden-yellow sleeve and the edge of a leather glove can be discerned.

The background is rendered in brownish-green tones, executed with short, rapid brushstrokes. From this subdued ground, the youth’s face emerges, illuminated by a soft, diffused light that avoids strong chiaroscuro contrasts. The modeling of the flesh reveals the virtuosity of Peter Paul Rubens’s palette, with cool bluish and warm yellow highlights in the most illuminated areas, and reddish-brown tonalities in the shadows.

== Comparison with other paintings ==
The painting has often been discussed as one of the finest representations of Nicolaas Rubens and is frequently compared with other works associated with him, such as the painting in the Royal Collection at Buckingham Palace known as The Falconer, which critics have often attributed to Peter Paul Rubens. In the face of the youthful hunter, some scholars have identified the artist’s son, Nicolaas Rubens. This interpretation, however, has never achieved unanimous acceptance. Doubts have frequently been raised both regarding the attribution to Rubens and the identity of the depicted figure.

At one point, the emergence on the Chicago art market between the two World Wars of another Falconer, or Portrait of Nicolaas Rubens, seemed likely to clarify the issue. It was initially believed that this work represented a preparatory sketch for the London painting. Soon, however, similar uncertainties arose among experts: the Chicago painting’s status as an autograph work began to be questioned. Today, the painting, preserved at the Art Institute of Chicago, is catalogued as “attributed to Peter Paul Rubens.”

It may be argued that the appearance of a third painted Portrait of Nicolaas Rubens, held in the Mimara Museum in Zagreb, provides a resolution to this longstanding problem. On the basis of numerous stylistic characteristics, this work can be identified as an authentic late-period sketch by Rubens, which likely served as a preliminary study for the Chicago painting and, ultimately, for the final composition of The Falconer in London.

The earliest known depiction of Nicolaas is considered to be the drawing Child with a Coral Necklace (Albertina, Vienna).

== Gallery ==
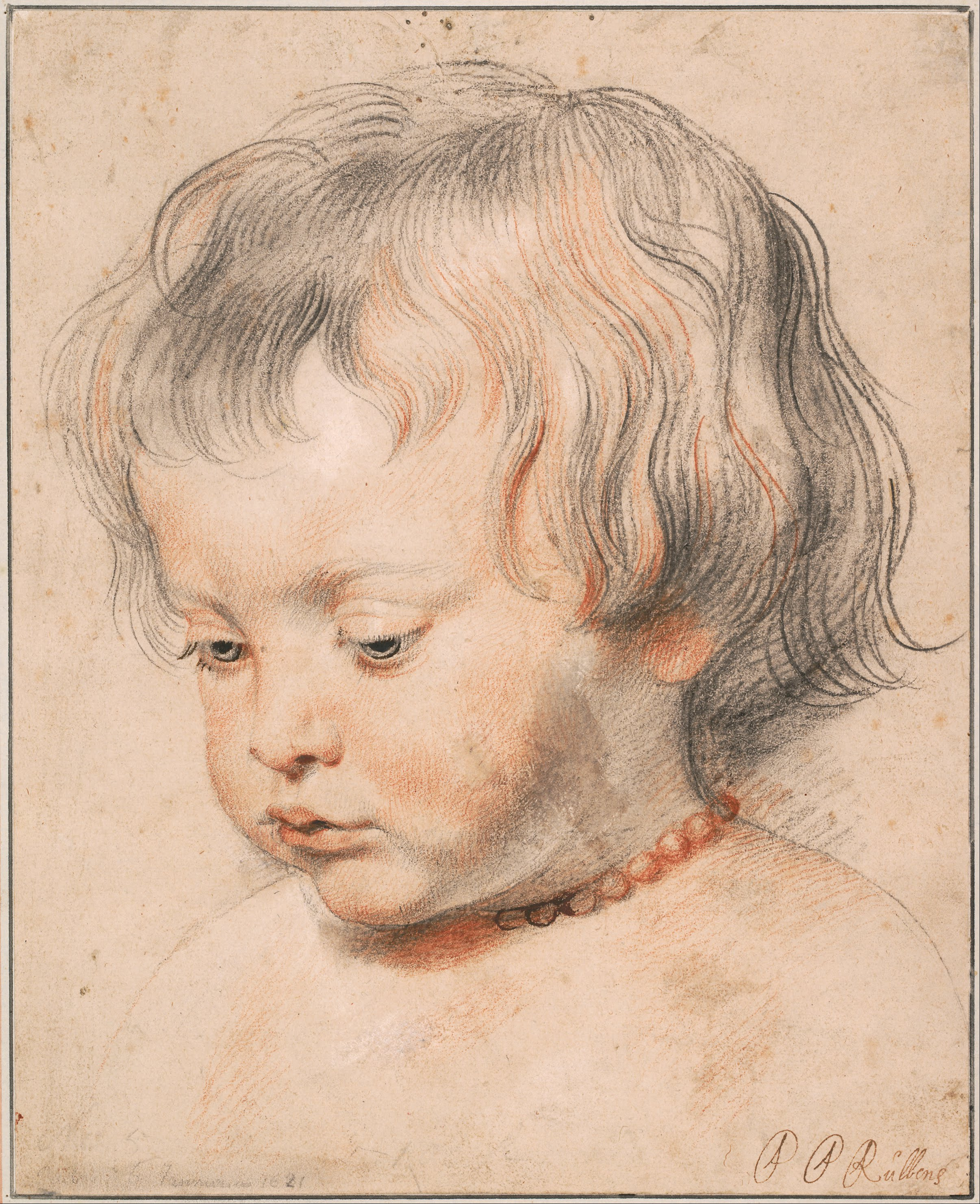
Nicolaas Rubens Wearing a Coral Neckless (c. 1619), Albertina

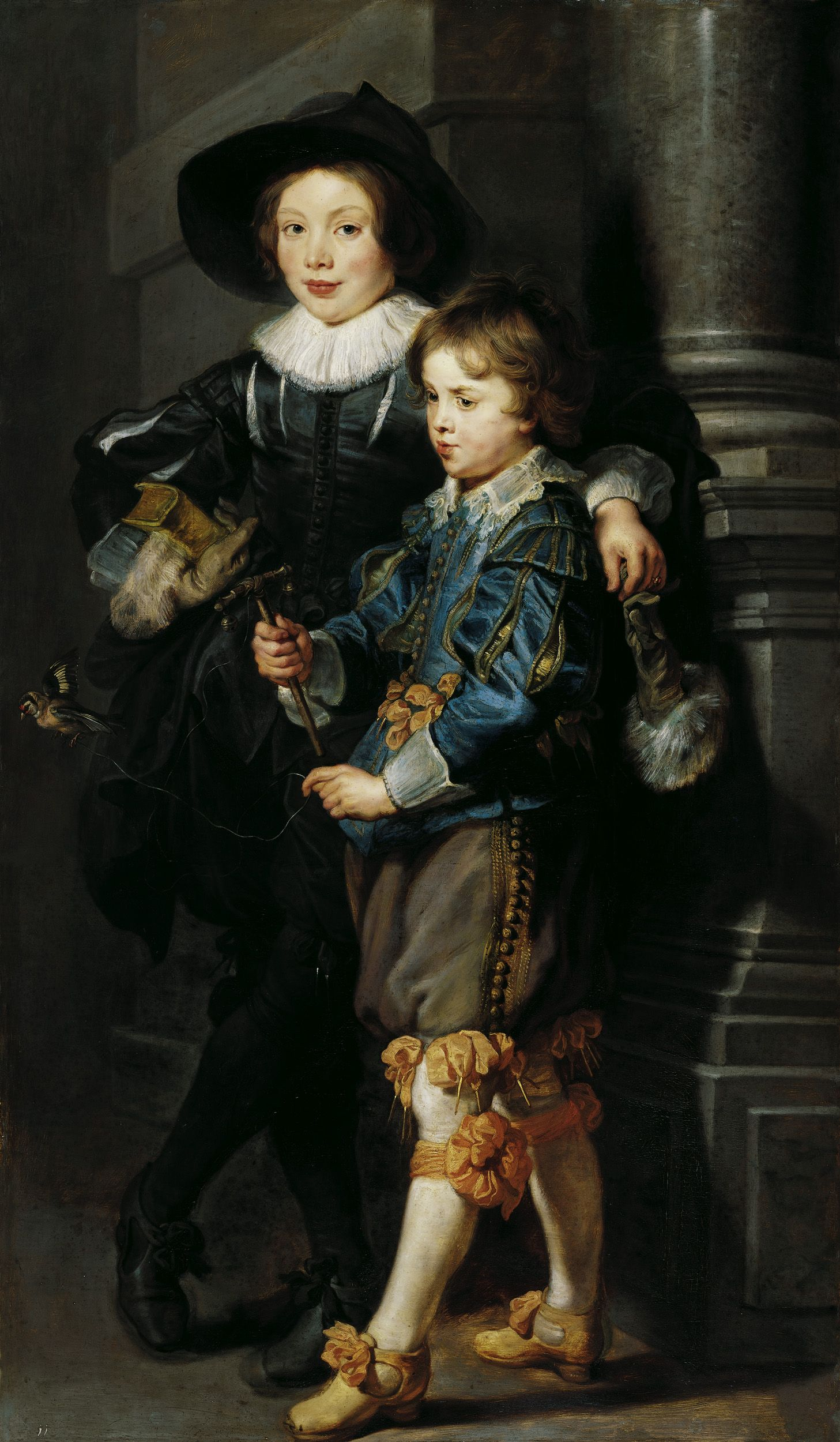
Portrait of Albert and Nicolaas Rubens c. 1626-1627, Gartenpalais Liechtenstein

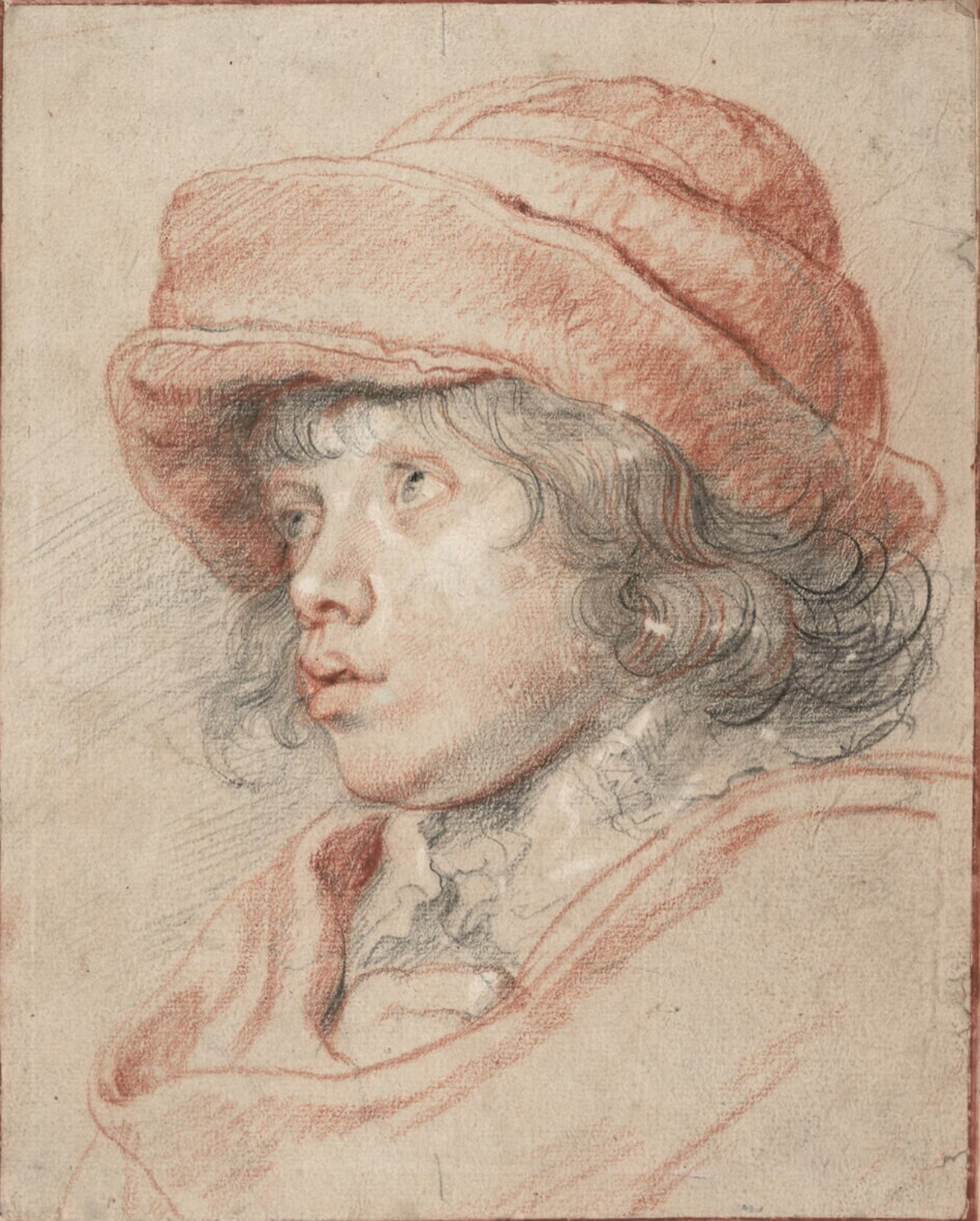
Portrait of Nicolaas Rubens, Son of the Artist, Wearing a Red Felt Cap, c. 1625-1627, Albertina

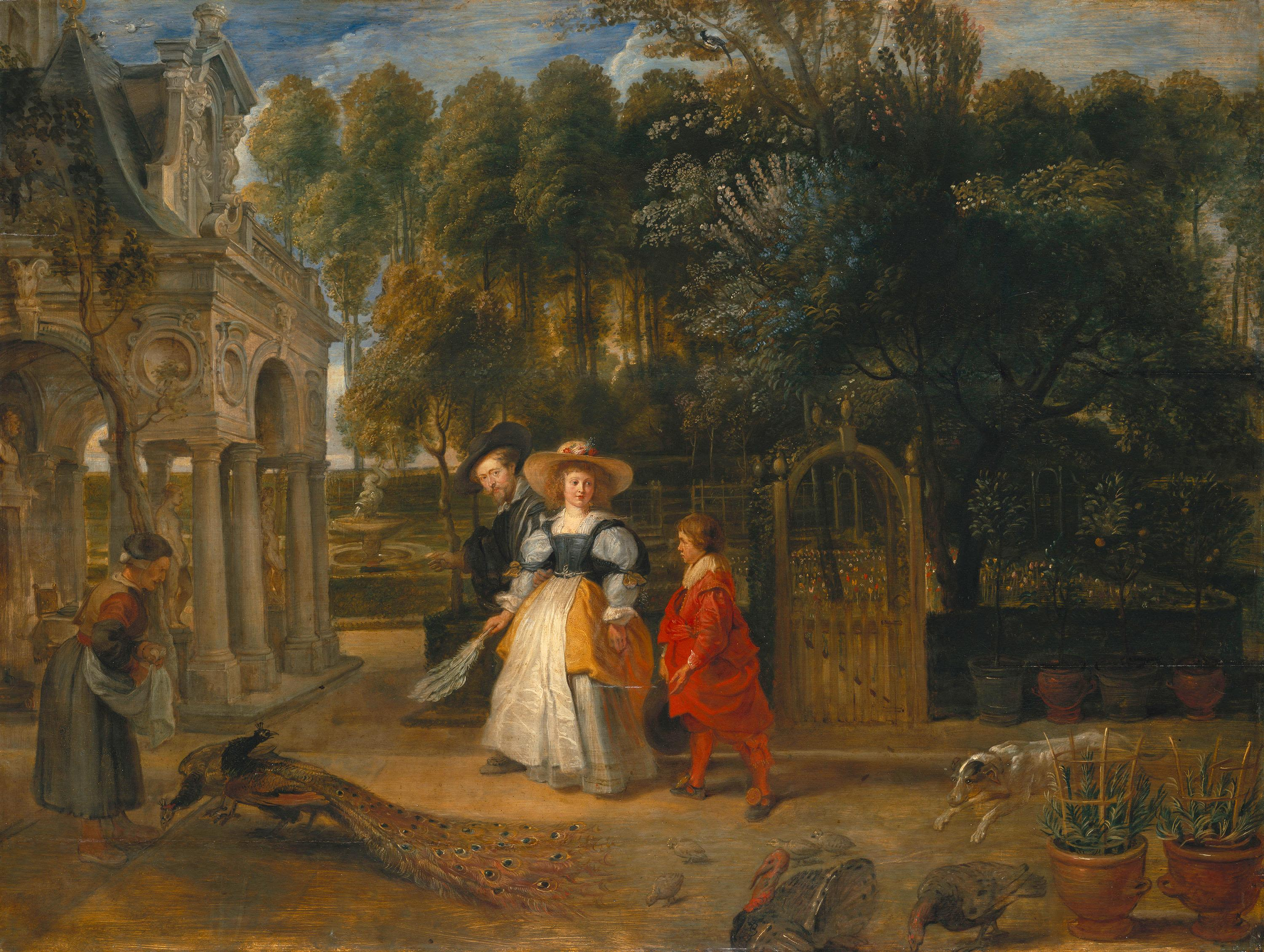
Rubens and his second wife in the garden c. 1640, Alte Pinakothek
