= Rameyen Castle =

Castle in Berlaar, Belgium

Coordinates: 51.123°N 4.683°E

- Berlaar, Belgium

Site information
- Type: Castle
- Owner: NV Hof Van Rameyen
- Open to the public: no

Rameyen Castle (Dutch: Hof van Rameyen) is a castle on a lake in Gestel, part of the municipality of Berlaar, in the province of Antwerp, Belgium. It was once owned by Nicolaas Rubens, Lord of Rameyen, who died in the castle. Nicolaas was the second son of Peter Paul Rubens.

The first known owner of Rameyen castle in Gestel was Jan II Berthout van Berlaer who lived in the castle in 1303. The oldest part of the castle is the square keep. This heavy tower dates to the 13th century. The keep was fitted with cannon holes in the 16th century.

A beautiful castle was built around the keep by Van Immerseele and de Cock families. Boudewijn de Cock sold the castle in 1643 to Nicolaas Rubens, Lord of Rameyen, the second son of the famous painter Pieter Paul Rubens. The castle stayed as a property of the Rubens family until 1759. During the 17th century the castle underwent major restorations and remodelling but at the end of the same century the castle stood empty and decay started. The restoration took place in the 19th century when Esquire Nicolaas Joseph Alphonse de Cock came in possession of the castle. The Esquire lived in the castle until 1888. Other restorations took place in 1906. During WWI the castle was damaged but the restorations were already finished before the war ended. The last restorations took place in 1960.

Joseph and Claartje de Gruyter bought the 700-year-old castle in 1995. “It was love at first sight,” Mrs. de Gruyter recalled of the castle, situated near Antwerp in northern Belgium. But the moated chateau, while livable, desperately needed modernizing. So shortly after moving in, the couple sought help from Rutger Steenmeijer, of R. Steenmeijer & H. Baksteen architects, and Axel Vervoordt. For the first three years, the de Gruyters set up house in the main part of the castle to familiarize themselves with the space while the renovation team worked on the outlying buildings, which included private stables, a coach house and caretaker's cottage. They then moved into the coach house while Mr. Steenmeijer and Mr. Vervoordt turned to the main dwelling. The renovation took over 6 years with a budget over 12 M. Euro

In November 2015, Family de Gruyter sold the property to NV Hof Van Rameyen a Belgian investment company.

== See also ==
- List of castles in Belgium
- Some kite aerial pictures of the Castle
- Some aerial pictures of the castle in wintertime

== Sources ==
- Inventaris onroerend erfgoed: Hof van Rameyen (in Dutch)
