= Stadtpalais Liechtenstein =

Palace in Vienna

Coordinates: 48°12′36″N 16°21′45″E

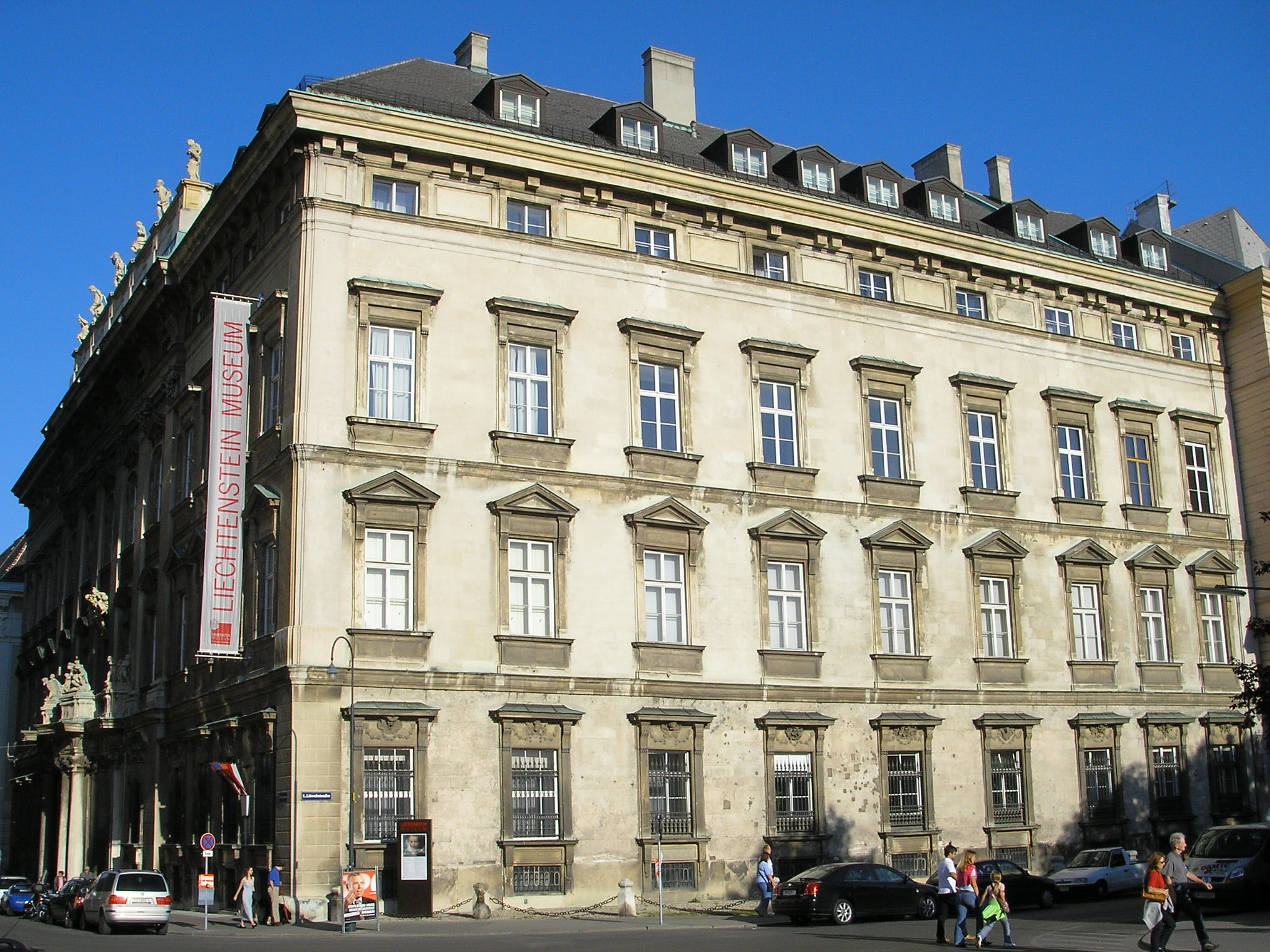
Liechtenstein City Palace, street view

Stadtpalais Liechtenstein (German for 'Liechtenstein City Palace') is a residential building at Bankgasse 9, in the first district of Vienna, Innere Stadt. The palace was built from 1692 to 1705 by the Italian architect Domenico Martinelli and the Swiss architect Gabriele Gabrieli.

The building is one of two palaces in Vienna belonging to the princely family of Liechtenstein. The other grand house still owned by the family in Vienna is the Liechtenstein Garden Palace.

The palace escaped destruction during World War II, when bombs fell nearby. After restoration in 2013, the building contains the 19th century portion of the princely art collection, whereas artworks from the 16th to 18th centuries are displayed at the Liechtenstein Garden Palace.

== Gallery ==
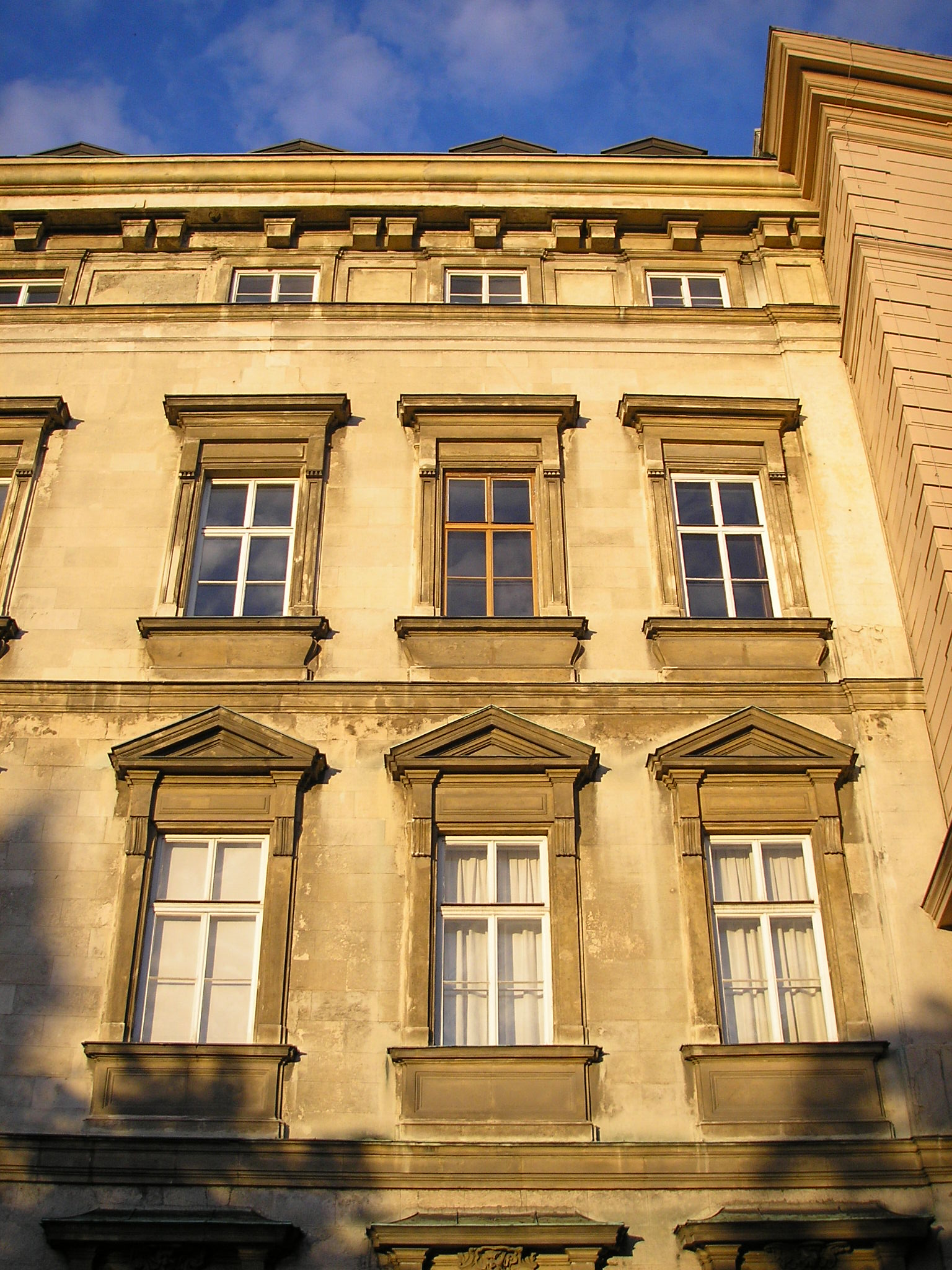
Exterior

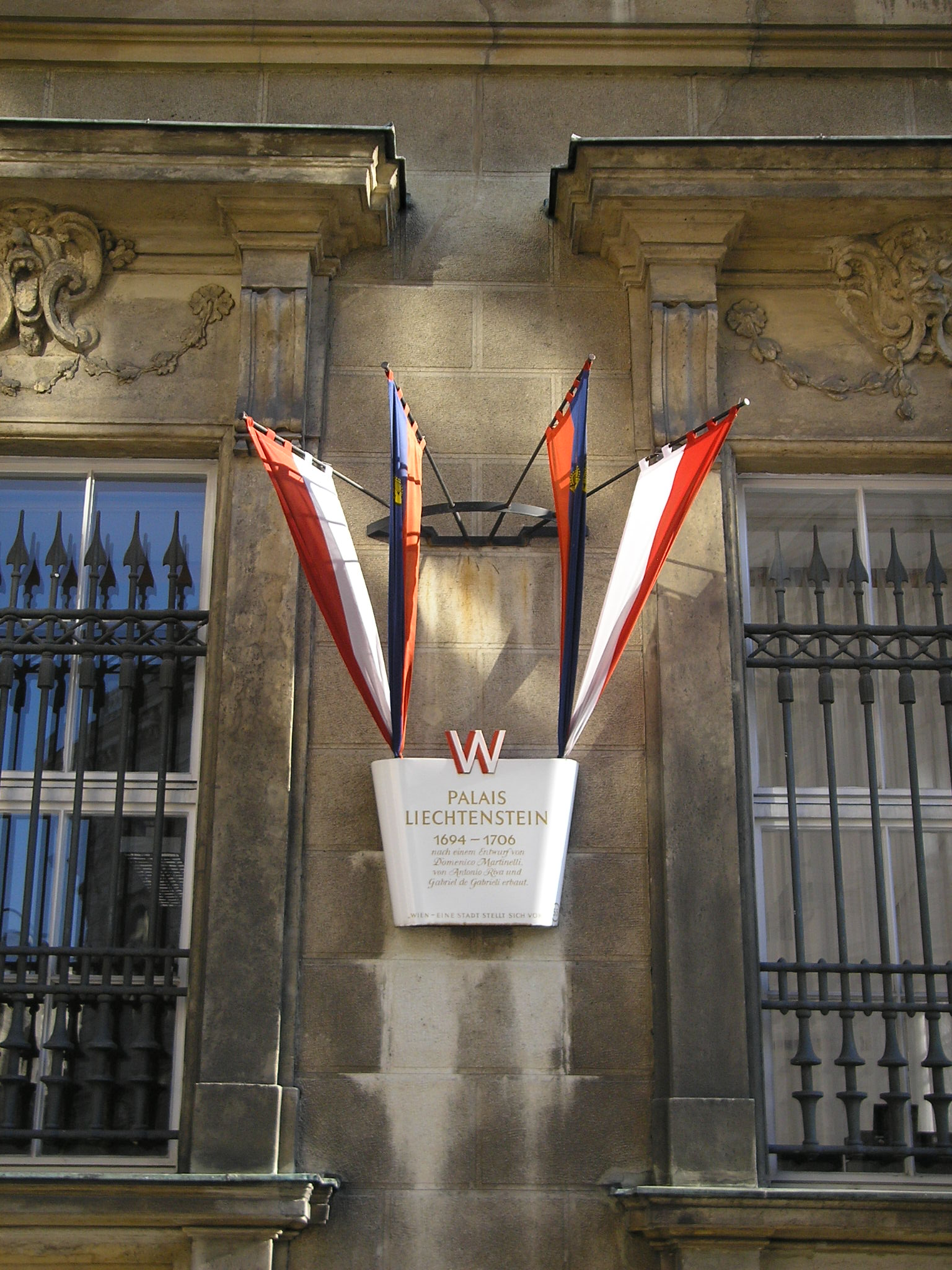
Exterior

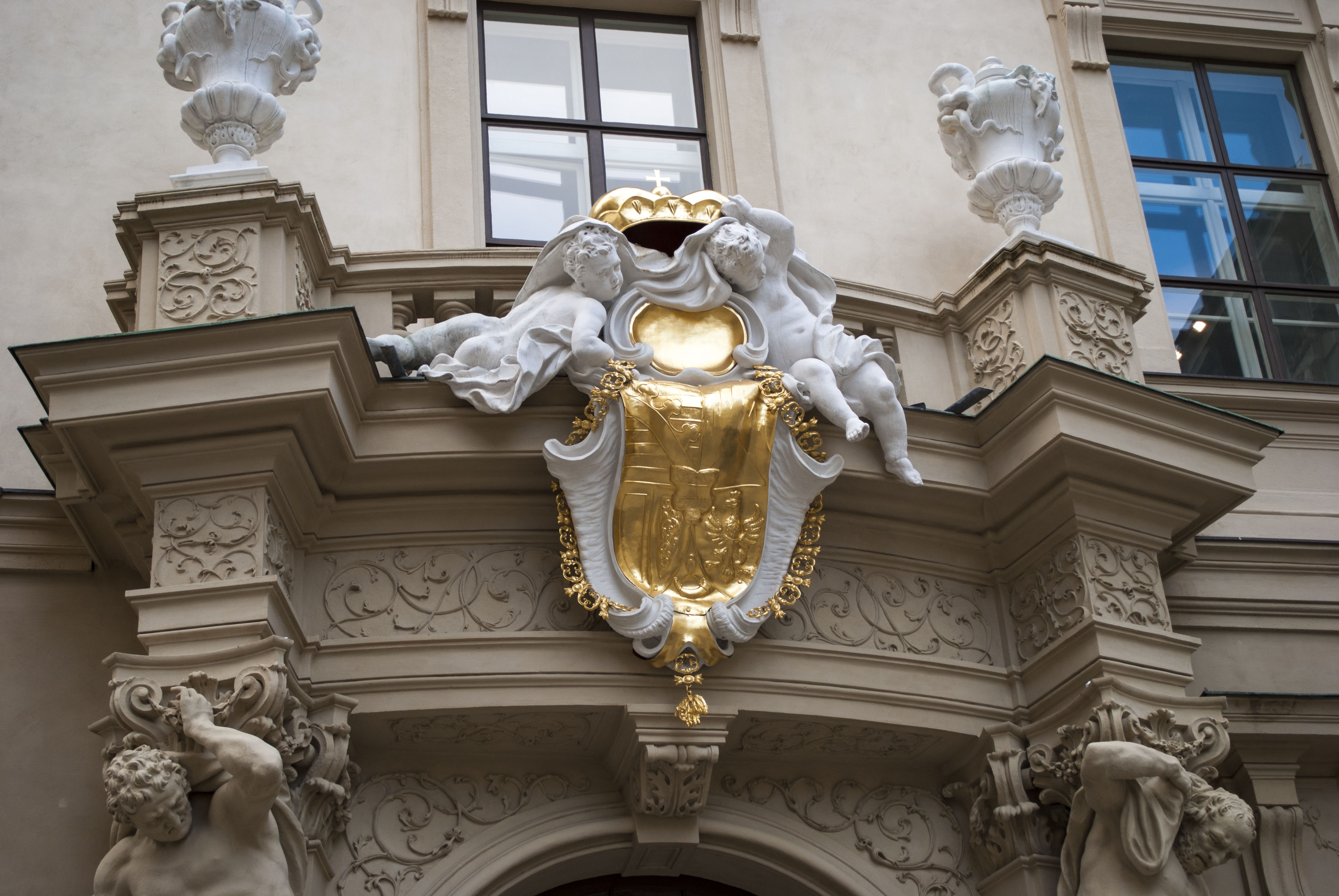
Portal

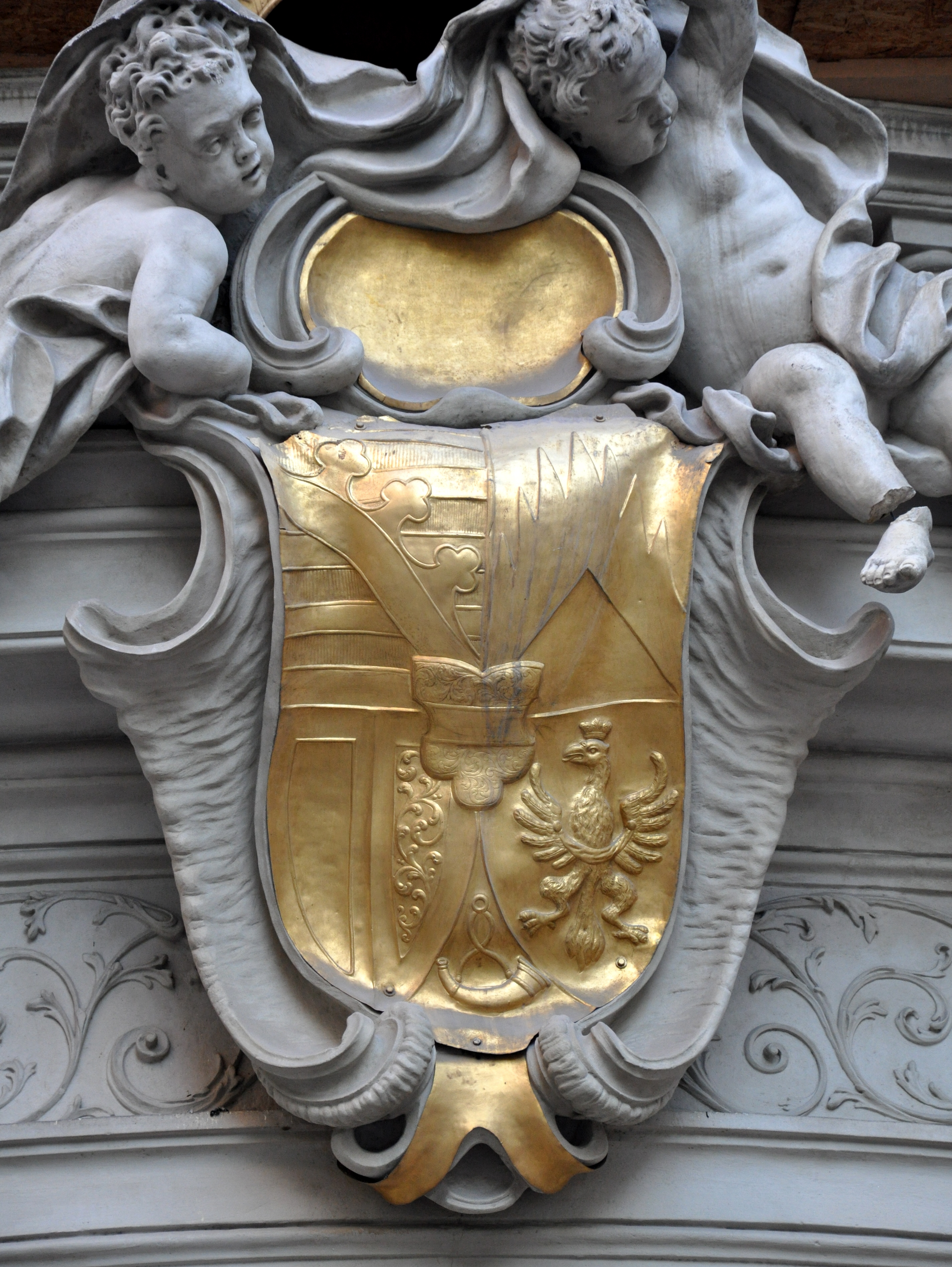
Coat of arms
