= Mars and Rhea Silvia =

1617 painting by Peter Paul Rubens

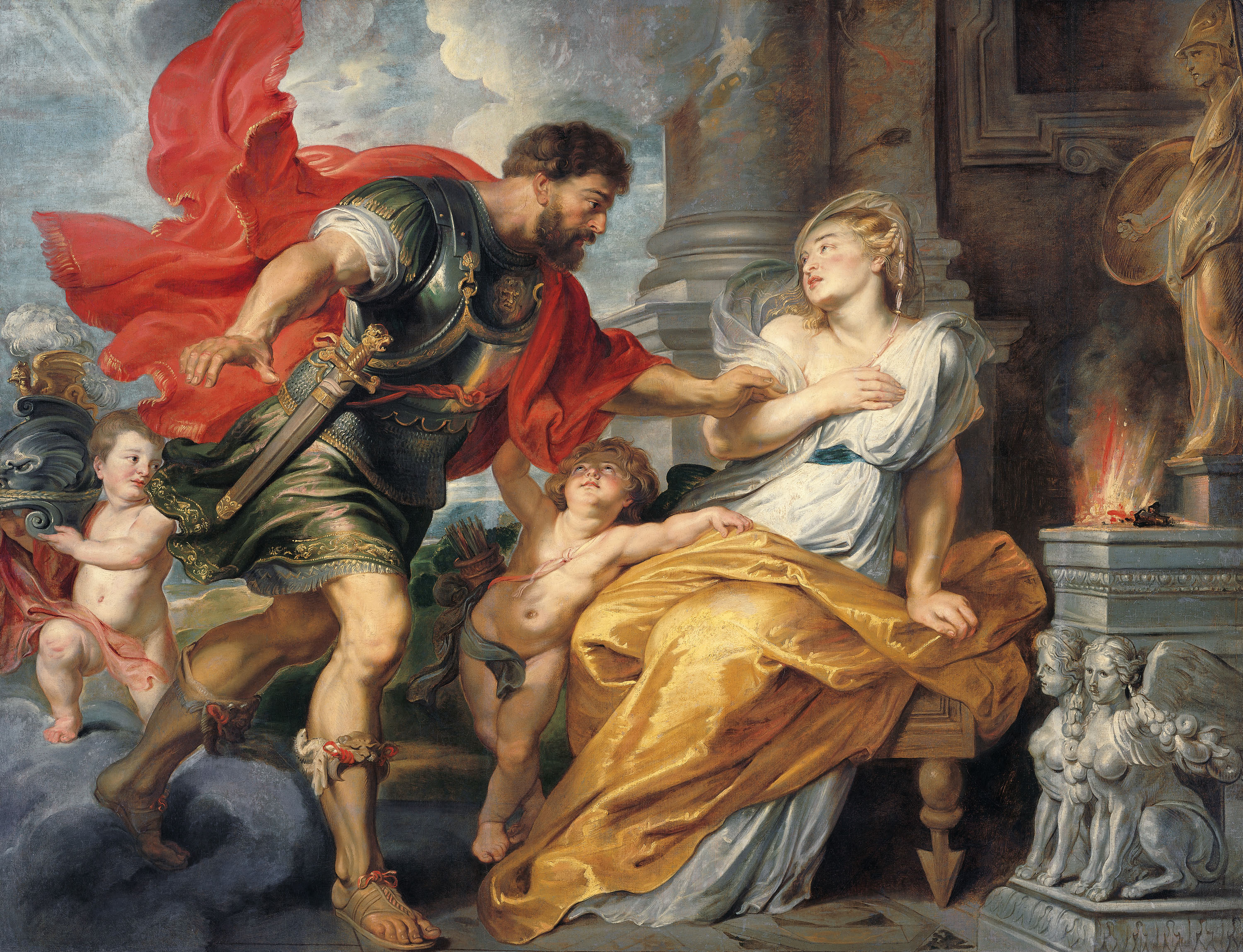
Mars and Rhea Silvia (1617) by Rubens

Mars and Rhea Silvia is a 1617 painting by Peter Paul Rubens, now in the Liechtenstein Museum in Vienna. It shows Mars's rape of Rhea Silvia, which resulted in the birth of Romulus and Remus, founders of Rome.
