= Gartenpalais Liechtenstein =

Liechtenstein Garden Palace
- Gartenpalais Liechtenstein (German)
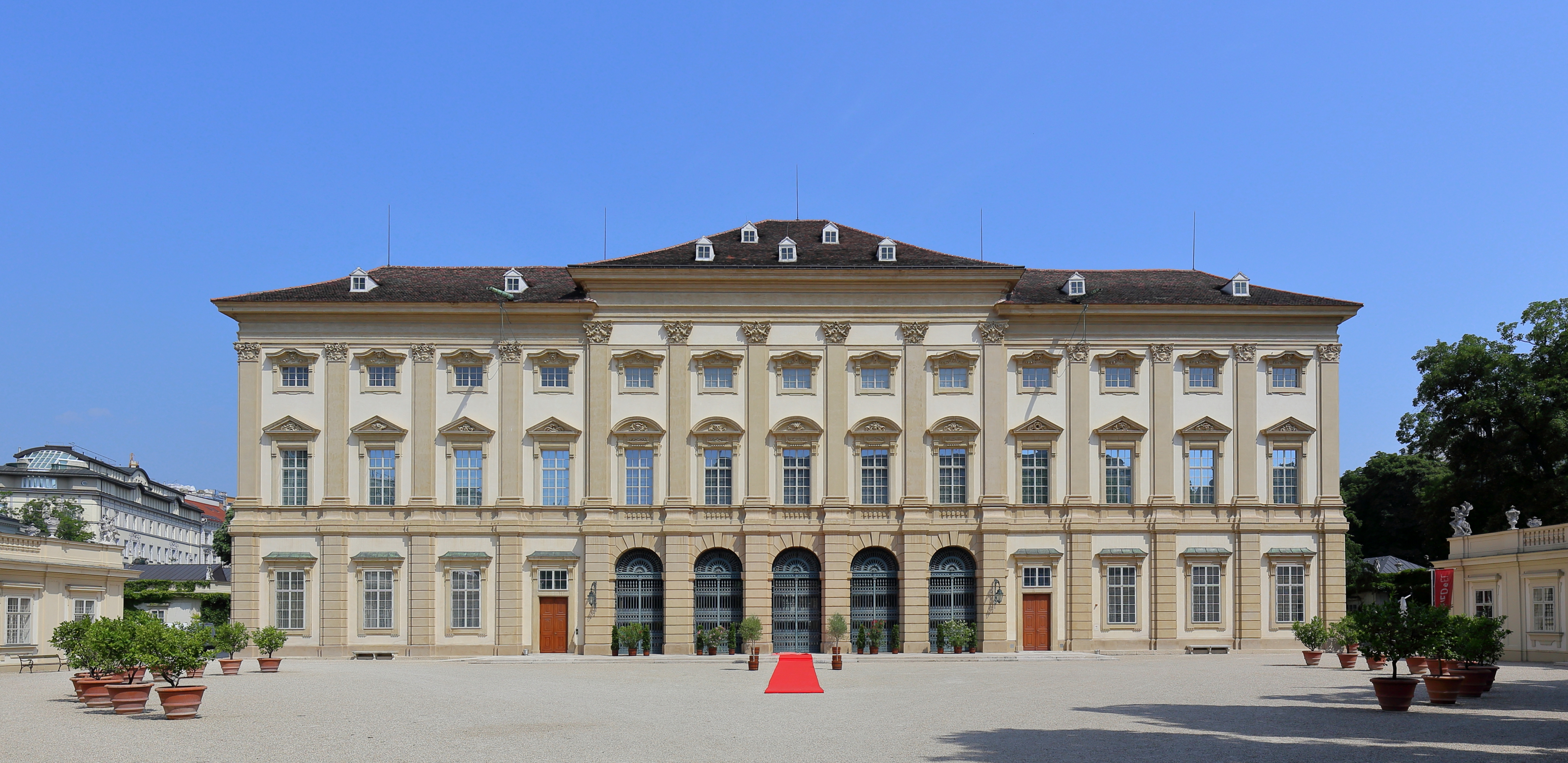
- Interactive map of Liechtenstein Garden Palace
- 48°13′21″N 16°21′35″E
- Location: Liechtenstein Garden Palace; Fürstengasse 1, Vienna, Austria

History
- Built: early 1700s

Site notes
- Owner: House of Liechtenstein

The Gartenpalais Liechtenstein (eng.: Liechtenstein Garden Palace) is a baroque palace on Fürstengasse in Vienna's 9th district, Alsergrund. The palace is owned by the Princely Family of Liechtenstein, rulers of Liechtenstein. It sits on the southern end of the Liechtensteinpark.

Until 2011, the palace was home to the Liechtenstein Museum. The building was renamed "Gartenpalais Liechtenstein" to distinguish it from the Stadtpalais Liechtenstein in the Innere Stadt.

== History ==
The Gartenpalais was built during the reign of Prince Johann Adam Andreas von Liechtenstein, who had acquired a plot in the Rossau suburb. He commissioned its design and construction from Domenico Egidio Rossi; the shell was finished in 1700.^{[1]} Artists Marcantonio Franceschini, Antonio Bellucci, Andrea Pozzo, and Johann Michael Rottmayr contributed to the décor in the palace. The palace, designed as a mix of a city and country house in the Roman style, was completed in the early 1700s.

== Garden ==
The garden was laid out in the style of a classic Baroque garden. The vases and statues were sculpted by local resident Giovanni Giuliani according to plans by Giuseppe Mazza. Around 1820, the garden was redesigned in a neoclassical style according to plans by Joseph Kornhäusel. An orangery, built in 1700, was placed opposite the palace on Fürstengasse.

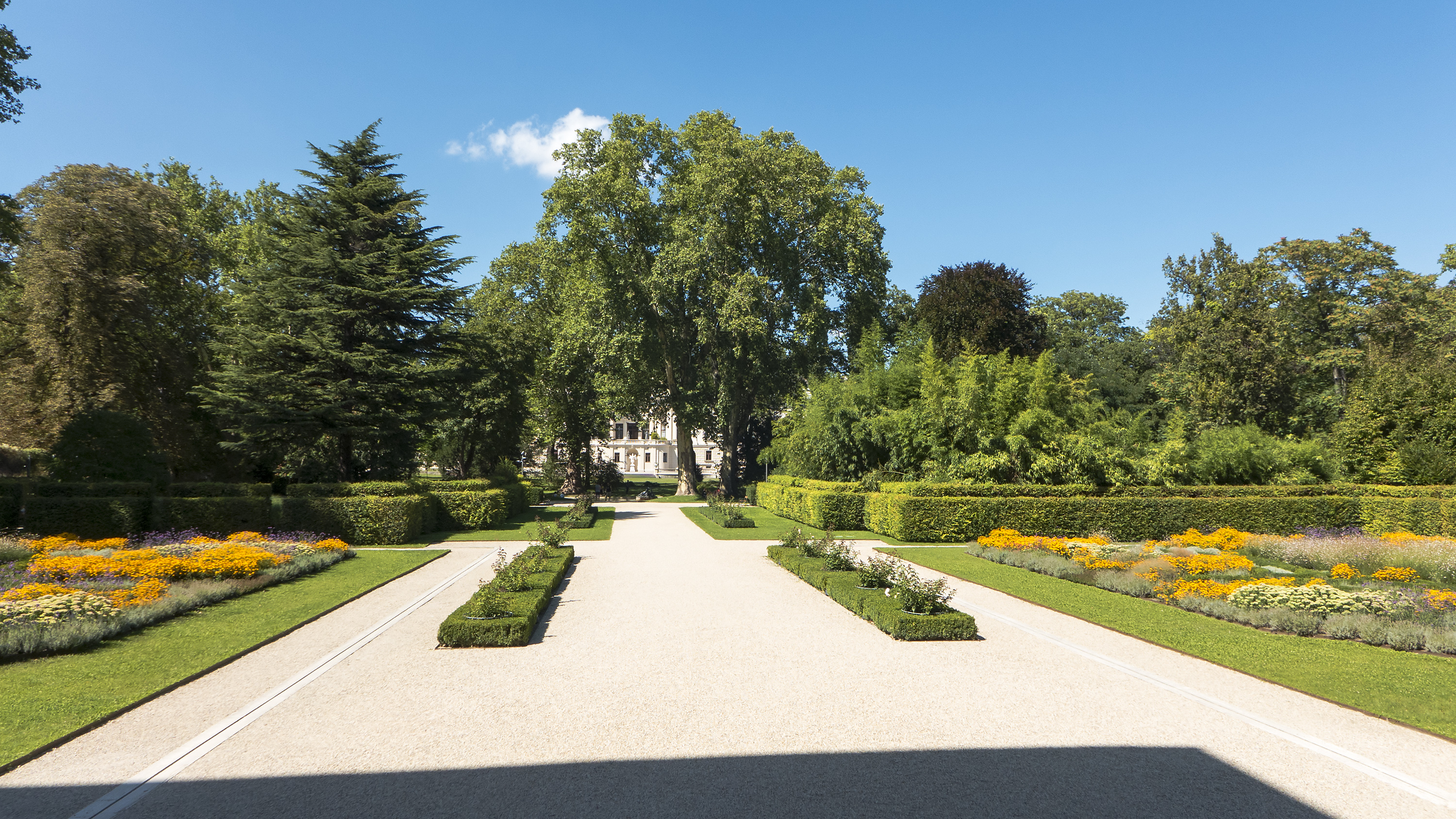
Liechtenstein park

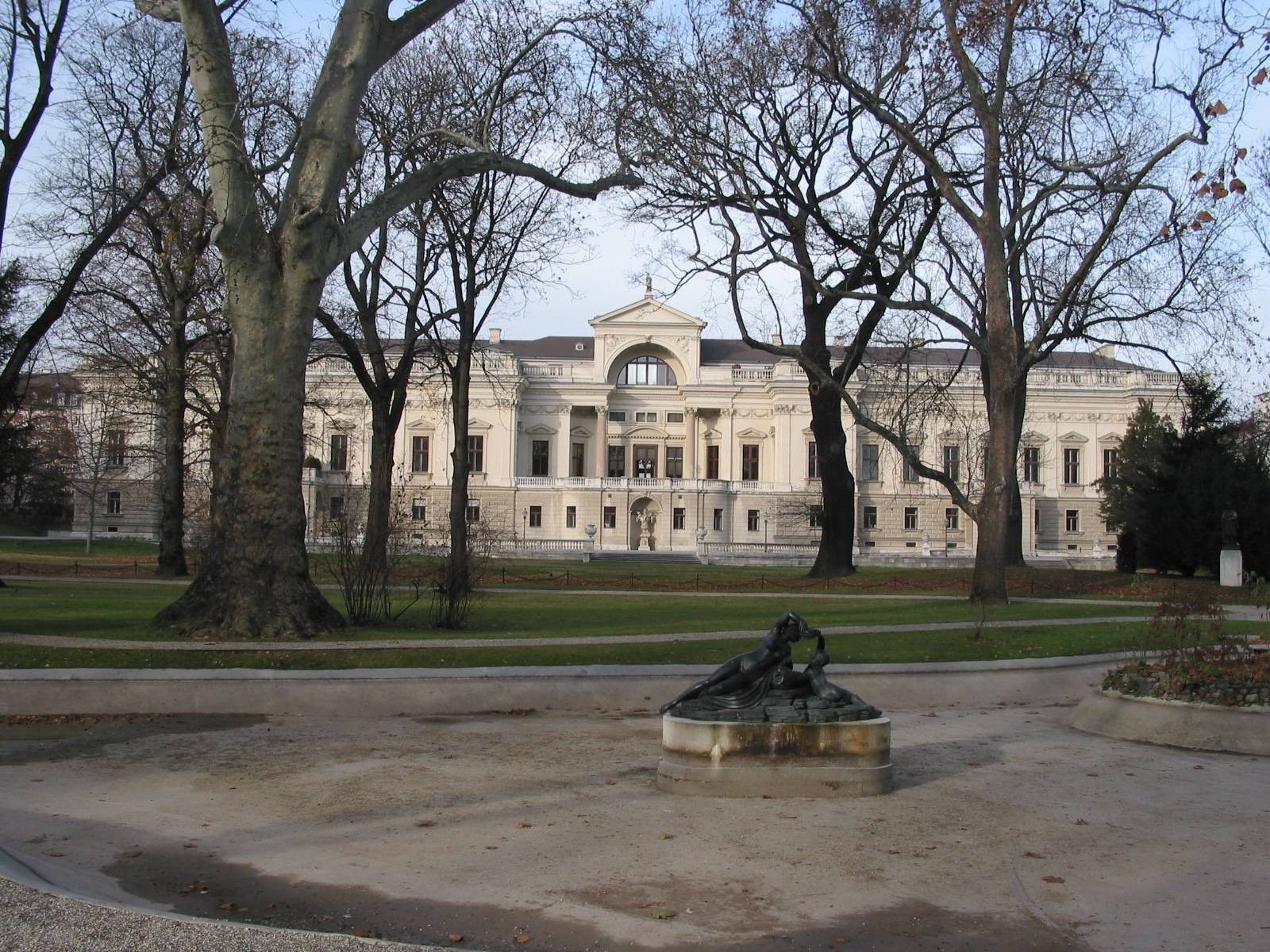
The Alserbachpalais, built for Countess Franziska

Originally, a garden belvedere stood on the northern side of the park. This was replaced between by the Alserbachpalais in 1875, designed by Heinrich von Ferstel for Countess Franziska, widow of Aloys II.

== Liechtenstein Museum ==
From 1805 to the Anschluss in 1938, the Palais housed the family collection of the House of Liechtenstein, which was also open to the public; the collection was then transferred to Liechtenstein, which remained neutral during the war and didn’t suffer from any bombing. In the 1960s and 1970s, the Bauzentrum (eng.: building centre) was housed in the palace as a tenant, an exhibition for the builders of detached houses and similar buildings. From 26 April 1979, the Museum des 20. Jahrhunderts (eng. Museum of the 20th Century), a federal museum, rented the building. The museum renamed itself Museum of Modern Art. In 2001, it moved to the newly built MuseumsQuartier.

From 29 March 2004 until the end of 2011, the Palais was part of the Liechtenstein Museum, whose collection, owned by the Princely Family of Liechtenstein, included paintings and sculptures from across five centuries. The museum also operated in the Stadtpalais Liechtenstein. The collection is one of the largest and most valuable private art collections in the world, with its main base in Vaduz.

In November 2011, it was announced that regular museum operations in the palace would be discontinued in January 2012 due to low visitor numbers. Exhibited works of art would then be on display only during the Long Night of Museums, for registered groups, and during rented events. The name Liechtenstein Museum will no longer be used.

=== Artworks (selection) ===
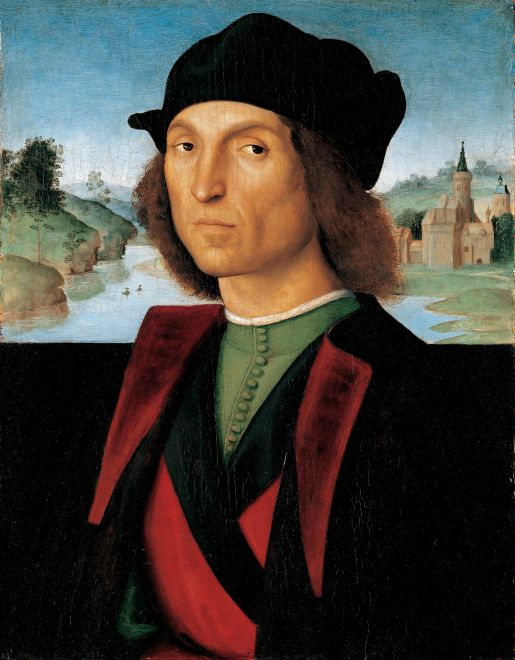
Raphael, Portrait of a Man

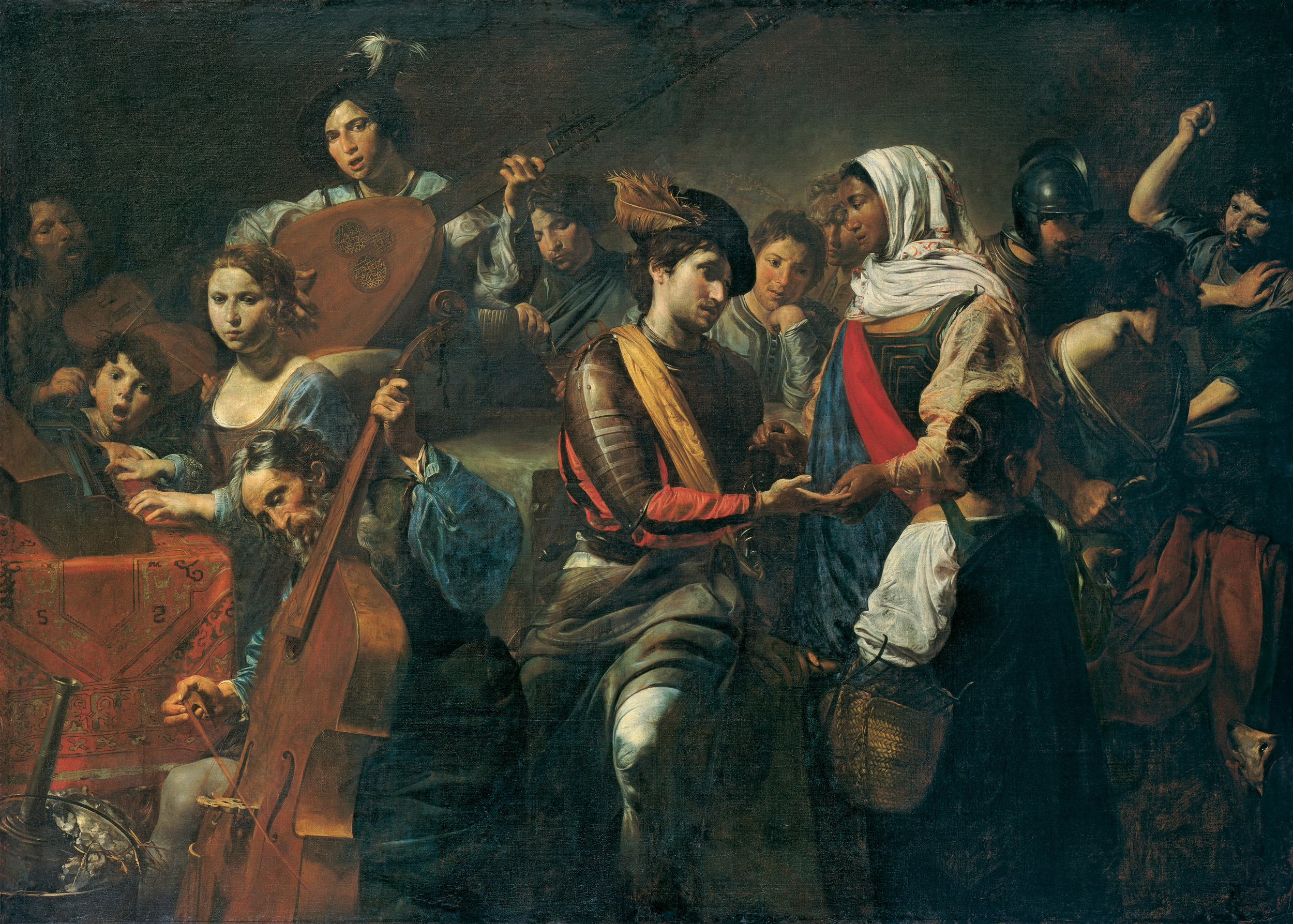
Valentin de Boulogne, A Musical Company with a Fortune-Teller ("Reunion with a Gypsy")

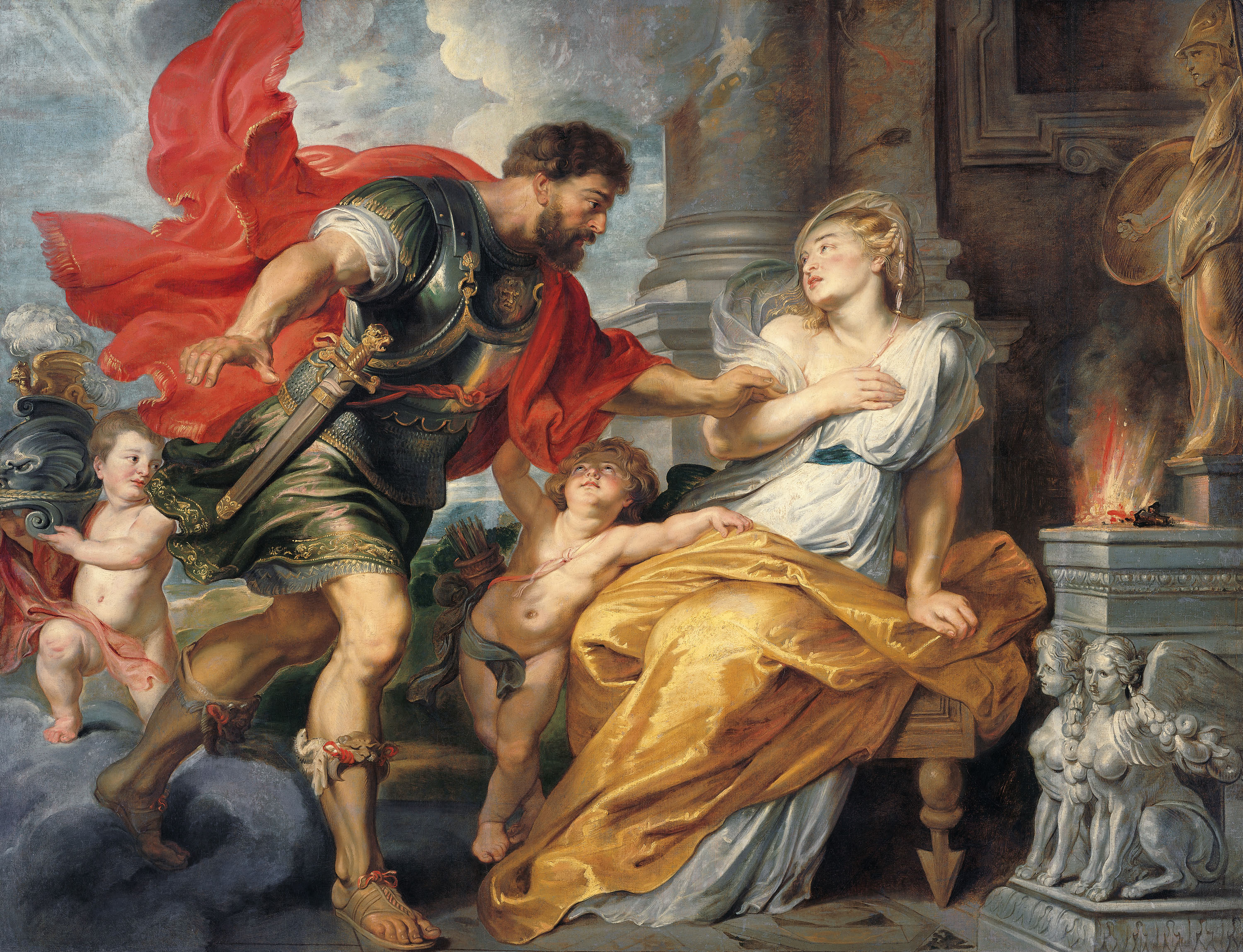
Rubens, Mars and Rhea Silvia

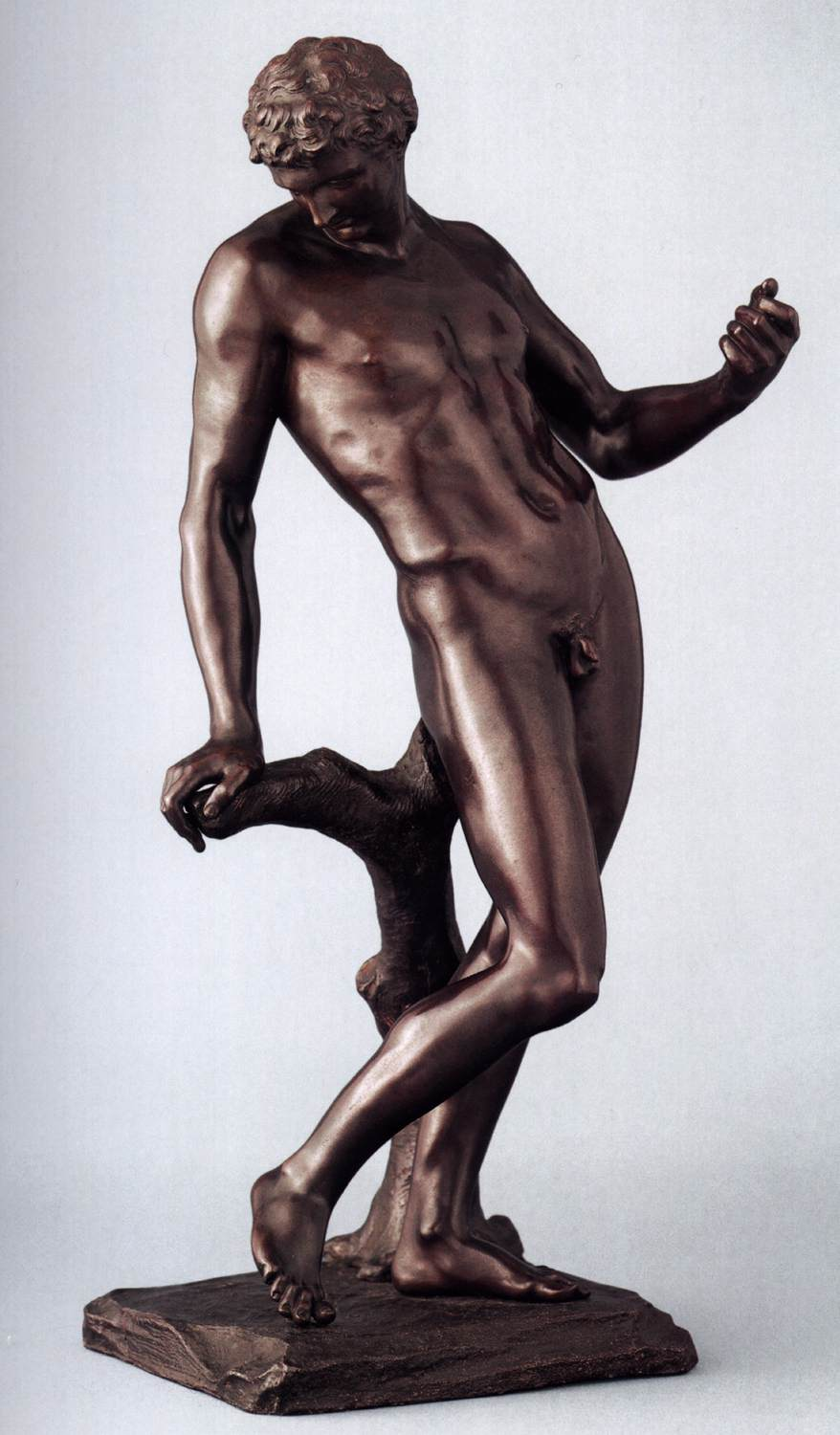
François Duquesnoy, Mercury

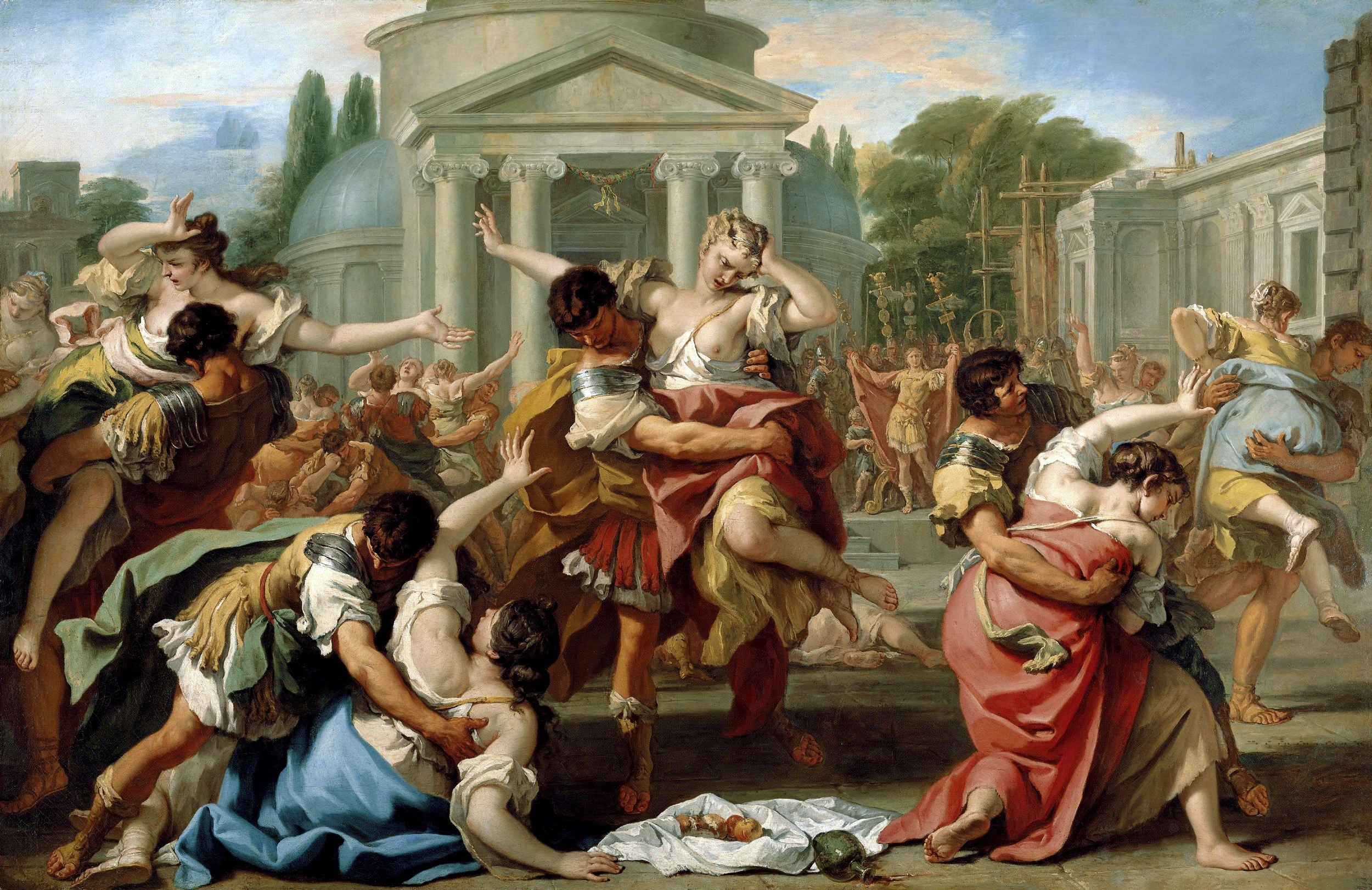
Sebastiano Ricci, Rape of the Sabine Women

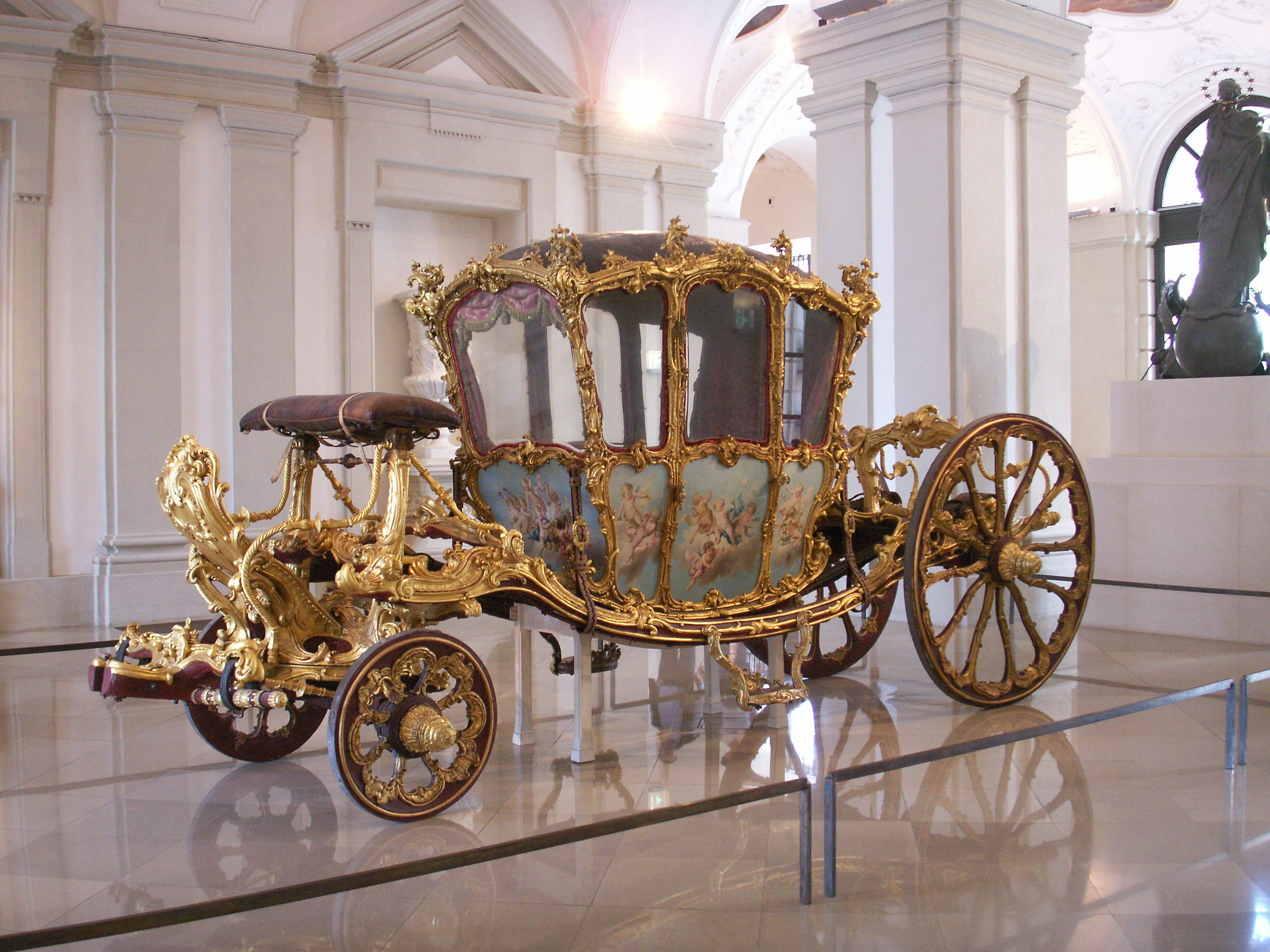
Golden carriage of Joseph Wenzel I. of Liechtenstein (1738)
