= A Man Called Adam (film) =

1966 film by Leon Penn

- Film poster
- Directed by: Leo Penn
- Written by: Lester Pine (as Les Pine); Tina Pine (as Tina Rome)
- Produced by: Ike Jones; James Waters
- Starring: Sammy Davis Jr.
- Cinematography: Jack Priestley
- Edited by: Carl Lerner
- Music by: Benny Carter
- Color process: Black and white
- Production company: Trace-Mark Productions
- Distributed by: Embassy Pictures
- Release dates: August 3, 1966 (New York); October 5, 1966 (Los Angeles)
- Running time: 104 minutes
- Country: United States
- Language: English

A Man Called Adam is a 1966 American drama musical film directed by Leo Penn and starring Sammy Davis Jr. It tells the story of a self-destructive jazz musician, played by Davis, and his tumultuous relationships with the people in his life.

== Plot ==
Adam Johnson is a talented African-American jazz cornetist plagued by ill health, racism, alcoholism and a short temper, as well as guilt over the deaths years before of his wife and child. The result is a caustic personality that wears on even those who care the most about him, such as his best friend Nelson and Vincent, a young White trumpeter whom Adam mentors. Arriving unexpectedly at his New York home drunk after leaving his jazz quintet, Adam finds prominent civil-rights activist Claudia Ferguson and her grandfather Willie, who is a well-known jazz trumpeter, in his apartment. Adam is rude to both and makes a vulgar pass at Claudia.

The next day, a sober Adam is apologetic and begins a friendship with Claudia and Willie. He is soon romantically involved with Claudia, although Nelson cautions Claudia, fearing that Adam will hurt her. However, she is determined to prevent Adam from destroying himself. The relationship has a positive effect on Adam.

Adam clashes with police officers and is arrested. Claudia is upset that he intentionally antagonized them, while Adam cannot understand why he should submit himself to humiliation. Adam begins to drink again and loses control of his temper. Adam's booking agent Manny wants to send Adam on a tour of the Southern United States, although Adam may face adverse treatment there. Adam violently threatens Manny and later physically assaults a jealous former girlfriend who had just slapped Claudia.

Adam tells Claudia that she is too good for him, but when he becomes sick, she moves into his apartment and their relationship is renewed. He confesses that he was driving while intoxicated, causing the car accident that killed his family. Claudia convinces Adam to reunite with his old group, but the police pressure the owner of the club where the group plays to ban him. When he learns of this, Adam lashes out at everyone, including Nelson, Claudia and Vincent.

Manny sends Adam on the Southern tour. However, when Adam hugs Vincent after a performance, a violent audience reaction ensues. Adam maintains control and does not respond. The tour continues successfully, and upon returning home, Adam proposes marriage to Claudia.

Vincent is violently attacked in front of Claudia and Adam, who remains frozen while Vincent is pummeled. Claudia reflects that it is she who changed Adam and stripped him of his manhood. Adam resurfaces at the club in rough physical condition and joins the group on stage. His performance begins brilliantly, but he begins to struggle physically and his playing turns frenetic. The group stops playing, and only Adam's fevered trumpeting is heard as he continues to play while in agony before he collapses and dies.

== Cast ==
- Sammy Davis Jr. as Adam Johnson
- Louis Armstrong as Willie Ferguson
- Ossie Davis as Nelson Davis
- Cicely Tyson as Claudia Ferguson
- Frank Sinatra Jr. as Vincent
- Mel Tormé as Guest Singer at Party (as Mel Torme)
- Peter Lawford as Manny
- Johnny Brown as Blind Les
- George Rhodes as Leroy
- Michael Silva as George
- Kai Winding as Trombonist
- Ja'Net DuBois as Martha (as Jeanette Du Bois)
- Michael Lipton as Bobby Gales
- Lola Falana as Theo
- Kenneth Tobey as Club Owner
- Gerald S. O'Loughlin as Red - the Sheriff
- Carl Lee as Minor Role
- Morris D. Erby as Minor Role (as Morris Erby)
- Lester Wilson as Minor Role
- Matt Russo as Minor Role
- Will Hussung as Judge
- Ted Beniades as Minor Role
- Roy Glenn as Police Detective Sergeant
- Don Crabtree as Minor Role
- Elvera Davis as Minor Role
- Brunetta Bernstein as Minor Role
- Joe Williams (jazz singer) as Guest at Party
- George Kirby as Guest at Party
- Nathaniel Adderley as Trumpet Soloist for Mr. Davis (as Nat Adderley)

== Production ==
A Man Called Adam was initially a Nat King Cole project. Following Cole's death, the rights reverted to Ike Jones, who had produced shows for Cole. Jones brought the project to producer Joseph E. Levine as the first of a proposed series of films. Jones became the first African American to produce a major American film.

The film was based on a composite of jazz musicians, including Miles Davis. It features several musical numbers, including Louis Armstrong performing "Back O' Town Blues" and two songs composed for the film by Benny Carter: Mel Tormé on "All That Jazz" and Sammy Davis Jr. with "Whisper to One". The film's trumpet performances by the Adam Johnson character were dubbed for Davis by Nat Adderley.

Johnny Brown, who later became better known as a comic actor on the television series Laugh-In and Good Times, plays the role of the blind pianist in Adam's jazz quintet. Brown's future Good Times co-star Ja'Net DuBois also appears in the film as a girlfriend of Adam.

In advance of the film's release, Signet Books published a novelization of the script written by the film's screenwriters, Lester and Tina Pine.

== Reception ==
In a contemporary review for The New York Times, critic Bosley Crowther wrote:

The picture fails, although it tries hard and, in some ways, admirably. Almost as provocative as the theme—a king trumpeter's decline—is the heartening fact that the movie not only stars a Negro artist but also has both Negro and white players in key roles. another rarity. ... The trouble is a man called Adam, and his kinship to the one called Job. Mr. Davis portrays the neurotic hero with savage intensity and deep feeling. But this focal character ... seems more of an aggressive self-chosen martyr than a man among men.

Critic Kevin Thomas of the Los Angeles Times wrote:

"A Man Called Adam" has all the class of a hastily-assembled TV drama hour. It has no style, just awkward stagings, and its tempo is as uneven as its script, an overly-familiar story of the decline and fall of a jazz great. But it is an exciting, entertaining picture (in multiple run) because that jazz man called Adam is Sammy Davis Jr. At the very least his performance is bravura, in the manner of that other celebrated Davis, Bette. The screen all but bursts with his intense talent. It is an awesome experience merely to witness him hold a pause. Time and again he turns dross into gold, making all false notes ring true.

== See also ==
- List of American films of 1966
