= Portrait of Monsignor Giovanni Battista Agucchi =

Painting by Annibale Carracci

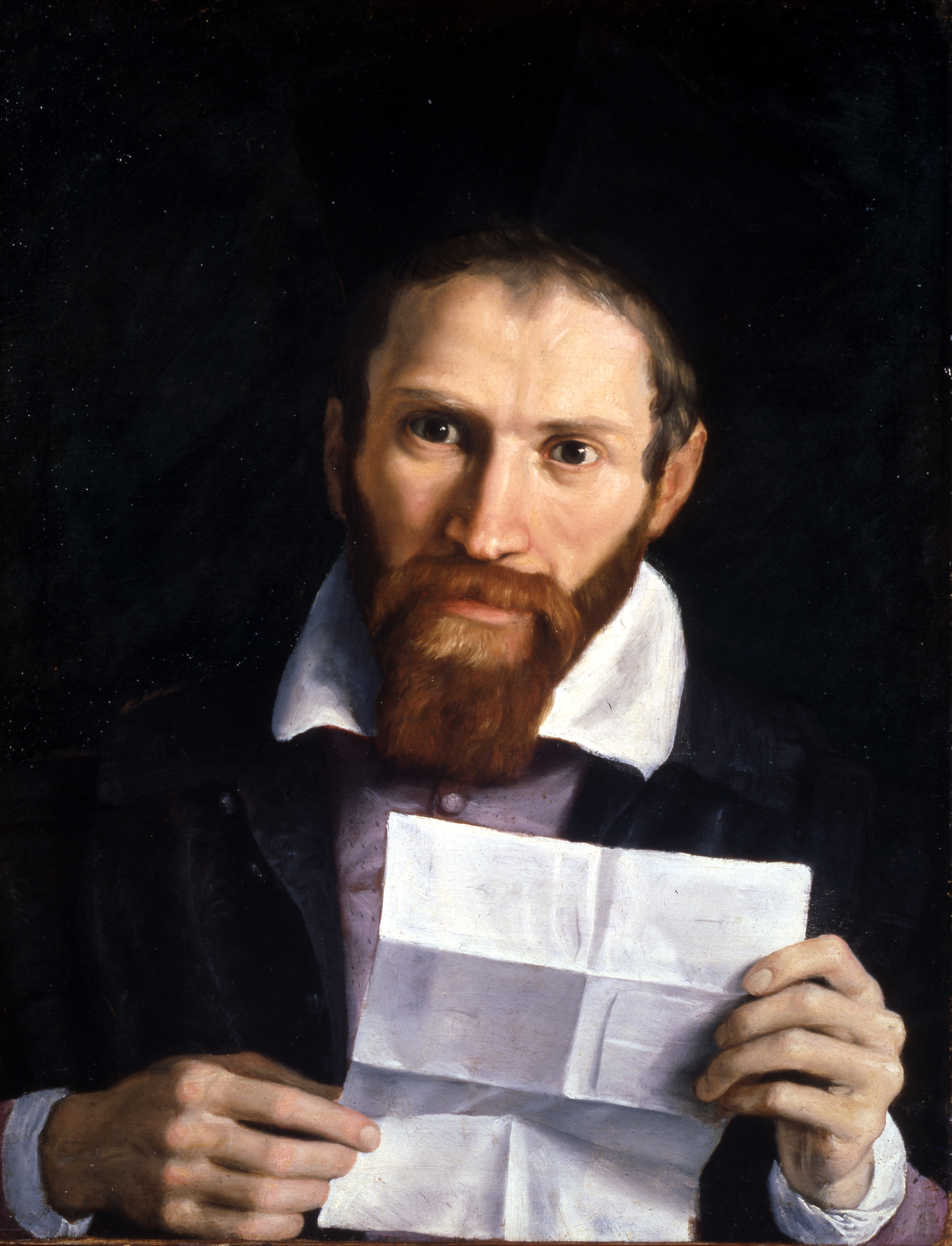
Portrait of Monsignor Giovanni Battista Agucchi (1604) attributed to Annibale Carracci

Portrait of Monsignor Giovanni Battista Agucchi is a 1604 oil-on-canvas painting now in York Art Gallery, to which it was presented via the National Art Collections Fund in 1955 by Francis Lycett Green (1893–1959), a collector and younger brother of Sir Edward Lycett Green, 3rd Baronet. Long attributed to Domenichino, it is now usually attributed to Annibale Carracci, though some art historians still support the old attribution based on archival discoveries. The Gallery accepts the new attribution, though this is not yet reflected in its ArtUK entry.

Its subject Giovanni Battista Agucchi was brother to Cardinal Girolamo Agucchi and a major supporter of Carracci. It appears as "Monsignor Agucchi in a chimere holding a letter with both hands and looking at the viewers" in the list of prints after paintings by Annibale Carracci in Carlo Cesare Malvasia's 1678 Felsina Pittrice, though other 17th-century sources attribute the painting to Domenichino. The attribution to Domenichino was held unanimously from the 19th century until 1994, when Silvia Ginzburg rediscovered the reference in Malvasia and found other documentary and stylistic evidence to support reattributing the work to Annibale. Denis Mahon, Daniele Benati and Tomaso Montanari have all backed the reattribution. During a loan to the National Gallery, London the work was displayed with the new attribution.

== Description and style ==
Already defined as one of the "most brilliant informal portraits painted in the seventeenth century", the portrait of Monsignor Agucchi has recently been indicated as one of the milestones of Baroque portraiture.

The art historian Tomaso Montanari (who believes the painting to be by Carracci) identifies in the portrait of Agucchi one of the first examples of a talking portrait, that is the type of portrait, typically Baroque, in which the portrayed is placed in direct relationship and personal with the observer, to the point that he seems to be about to speak to him.

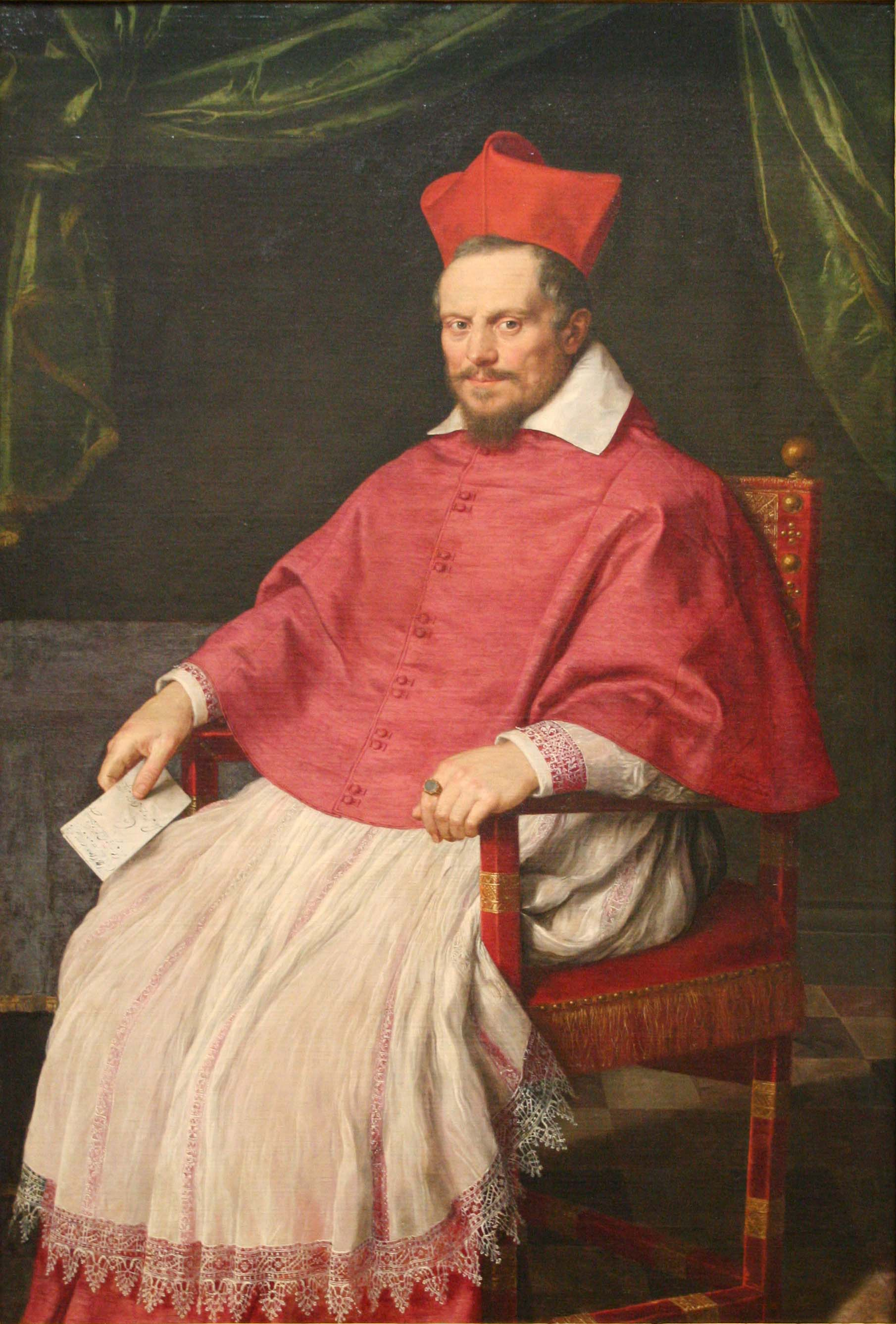
Domenichino, Portrait of Cardinal Jean de Bonsi, 1616, Musée Fabre, Montpellier

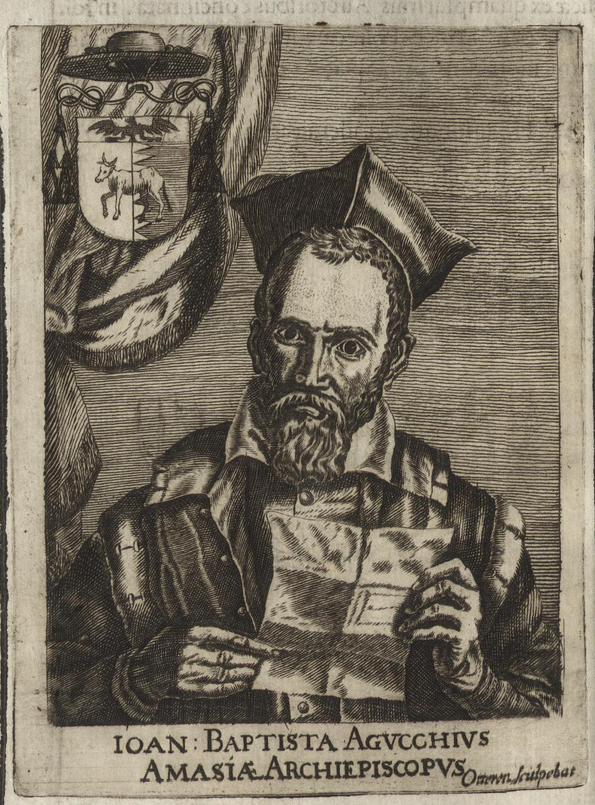
The print quoted by Malvasia, inserted into Memorie imprese, e ritratti de' signori Accademici Gelati di Bologna, 1672
