= Hands On =

Hands On may refer to:

- Hands On USA, now All Hands Volunteers, a relief project established to help victims of Hurricane Katrina
- Hands On Learning Australia, a nonprofit that provides an alternative learning framework for disengaged students to reconnect with school and community
- Hands On (TV series), TV program for deaf and hard-of-hearing people in Ireland
- Hands On (album)
- Hands On (song), By Kanye West from Jesus Is King
