= Pericle Luigi Giovannetti =

Swiss painter and illustrator (1916–2001)

- Born: Pericle Luigi Giovannetti; 22 June 1916; Basel, Switzerland
- Died: 19 August 2001 (aged 85); Ascona, Switzerland
- Other name: Luigi Pericle
- Occupations: painter, cartoonist, illustrator
- Known for: paintings, drawings, inks, cartoons, writings
- Spouse: Orsolina Klainguti
- Parents: Pietro Giovannetti (father); Eugenie Rosé (mother)
- Website: https://luigipericle.org/

Pericle Luigi Giovannetti (Basel, 22 June 1916 - Ascona, 19 August 2001), also known as Luigi Pericle, was a Swiss painter and illustrator of Italian origin.

== Biography ==
Born in Basel in 1916, to an Italian father, Pietro Giovannetti, from Monterubbiano – in the Marche region – and a mother of French origin, Eugenie Rosé, Pericle Luigi Giovannetti attended an art academy at the age of sixteen, but soon he left and became self-taught. During his youth, he studied the East Asian, ancient Egyptian and Greek philosophies on his own.

In 1947 he married the Grisons painter Orsolina Klainguti. In the 1950s, Giovannetti and his wife moved to Ascona where they led a very secluded life and resided until their death. In his handwritten autobiography entitled Bis ans Ende der Zeiten (Until the end of time) completed in 1994 but never published, Giovannetti defines the years 1958 to 1965 as "Jahre des Umbruchs" ("the years of radical change").

The house where Giovannetti lived until the end of his days was called "Casa San Tomaso". After the artist's death in 2001, it had been closed down for sixteen years as he had no heirs. In December 2016, the property was purchased by his neighbours, and that's when the existence of paintings and inks, as well as unpublished documents was discovered.

=== Max the Hamster and the cartoon production ===
Giovannetti started to work as a draughtsman producing materials for the British satirical magazine Punch. There he published different comic book characters’ stories.

In 1951, his first book Das betrunkene Eichhorn, signed as Pericle Giovannetti, was published by the Vineta Verlag publishing house. In 1952, he produced an illustrated children's book for the Swiss Union of Free Trade Unions as a Christmas gift.

In 1953, Giovannetti created Max the Hamster, the main character of the homonymous comic strips with no texts, for all ages, which brought him international fame: the cartoon character soon became popular, especially in Europe, the United States and Japan.

The book Max was reprinted in 25 editions between 1954 and 2004, the reprints of Giovannetti's various works continued over the years and until 2015, when Creative Media Partners published Max Presents Portraits, Sketches, Vignettes, and Pictorial Memoranda of Men, Women, and Other Animals.

In 1958, in collaboration with Clive King, Giovannetti wrote the children's story Hamid of Aleppo and he also produced the illustrations.

His work as an illustrator was released by the New York-based publisher Macmillan and was also published in popular newspapers and magazines such as The Washington Post, New York Herald Tribune, and Punch. At that time, he signed his work as Giovannetti or Pericle Giovannetti.

The books with the adventures of Max, and of other characters as well, were reprinted several times in Germany, France and the United Kingdom.

=== Luigi Pericle ===
In 1959 Giovannetti, signing himself Luigi Pericle, began a collaboration with Peter G. Staechelin, an art collector from Basel, who acquired several of the artist's works for his own collection. In 1962, Giovannetti met Martin Summers, gallery owner and curator at the Arthur Tooth & Sons Gallery in London, where the painter held two solo exhibitions, in 1962 and 1965, and two group exhibitions – Colour, Form and Texture and Contrasts in Taste II – both in 1964.

In 1963, some works were also exhibited in Ascona at the Castelnuovo Art Gallery. Giovannetti met Hans Hess, museologist and curator of the York Art Gallery. In 1965, Hess organized an itinerant solo exhibition, displaying a selection of 50 works, in several British museums, including: York, Newcastle, Hull, Bristol, Cardiff and Leicester.

In January 1965, Herbert Read – art critic, co-founder of the Institute of Contemporary Art in London and artistic consultant for Peggy Guggenheim – visited Pericle's studio in Ascona. Later, he curated the second solo exhibition of Luigi Pericle's work in London and wrote the preface to the catalogue that would afterwards be included in the book Luigi Pericle: dipinti e disegni (Luigi Pericle: paintings and drawings). From the 1960s to the 1980s, the artist produced a series of works on canvas and masonite, inks and drawings. During this period, the Luigi Pericle: dipinti e disegni (Luigi Pericle, paintings and drawings) catalogue was printed: the project of a monograph devoted to the artist was initiated in collaboration with Staechelin and, after the latter's death, was completed with his son, Ruedi Staechelin.

The paintings by Luigi Pericle are now part of the Municipal Collection of Ascona, the permanent collection of the Bristol Museum & Art Gallery in Bristol and the permanent collection of the York Art Gallery Museum in York.

Since the end of 2018, further research carried out by the Luigi Pericle Archive resulted in the rediscovery of the artist and the exhibition that took place at the Fondazione Querini Stampalia (11 May–24 November 2019) accompanied by the publication of the catalogue Luigi Pericle. Beyond the visible.

== Comic books and illustrated books ==
- (DE) Aus meiner Menagerie Nebelspalter-Verlag, 1951
- L'unione fa la forza : strenna natalizia per i piccini, Unione Svizzera dei sindacati liberi, 1952
- (DE) Das betrunkene Eichhorn, Vineta-Verl, 1951
- (EN) Max, MacMillan Company, 1954
  - (DE) Max, Zurigo, Sanssouci, 1954
    - Max, Baldini e Castoldi, 1959
      - (EN) Max, Atheneum, 1977, ISBN 978-0689500824
        - (FR) Max, Ecole des loisirs, 2003, ISBN 978-2211070744
- (EN) Max Presents: Portraits, Sketches, Vignettes and Pictorial Memoranda of Men, Women and Other Animals; Conceived by Max, Supervised by Max, Selected by Max, Arranged and Edited by Max, Commentary by Max, Macmillan (N.Y.), 1956
  - (EN) Max Presents Portraits, Sketches, Vignettes, and Pictorial Memoranda of Men, Women, and Other Animals, HardPress Publishing, 2013, ISBN 978-1313557467
    - (EN) Max Presents Portraits, Sketches, Vignettes, and Pictorial Memoranda of Men, Women, and Other Animals, Creative Media Partners, LLC, 8 August 2015, ISBN 978-1296562311.
- (EN) Beware of the Dog, Macmillan, 1958.
- (EN) Clive King e Giovannetti, Hamid of Aleppo, MacMillan Company, 1958
- (EN) Nothing But Max, MacMillan Company, 1959
- (EN) Birds without words, MacMillan Company, 1961
- (EN) The Penguin Max, Penguin, 1962
- (DE) Jawassinüdsäged! Nebelspalter-Verlag, 1971
- (DE) Max: d. Murmeltier, über d. d. Welt schmunzelt, Heyne, 1973,
  - Max - Das Murmeltier, 1981 ISBN 978-3453003118
- (DE) 111 neue Kaminfeuergeschichten, Nebelspalter-Verlag, 1975
- (DE) Pablo, Nebelspalter-Verlag, 1976
- (DE) Ja - wer chunt dänn daa? Nebelspalter-Verlag, 1976
- (DE) Max : alle Abenteuer des Murmeltiers, über das die Welt schmunzelt, Heyne, 1993

== Bibliography ==
Luigi Pericle, Luigi Pericle: dipinti e disegni, Roma, Romagraf, 1979. Distributed by Istituto Geografico de Agostini (Catalogue)

Chiara Gatti, Luigi Pericle: Beyond the visible, Cinisello Balsamo, Silvana Editoriale 2019 (ISBN 9788836643073)
