= Hands On (TV series) =

Hands On is the TV programme for deaf and hard-of-hearing people in Ireland. The programme airs twice a month on Sunday on RTÉ One, Ireland's national public service broadcaster. Hands On first aired on RTÉ in 1996. Its predecessor, Sign of the Times, aired on RTÉ from 1988 to 1995.

Hands On is produced by a mixed deaf and hearing team and there are nine presenters working on the programme, who present the programme through Irish Sign Language (ISL), the first language of the deaf community in Ireland. The programme is also subtitled with an English voice-over.

== Presenters ==
Hands On's presenting team is Sarah Jane Moloney, Caroline Worthington, Teresa Lynch, Seán Herlihy, Eddie Redmond, Senan Dunne, Caroline McGrotty, Julianne Gillen and Ronan Dunne.

== Format ==
Each series consists of 14 new programmes and 6 "Best Of" programmes. The programme generally consists of deaf news, an animation for deaf children titled Molly & Mr Milk, and three magazine stories of differing themes; information pieces, interviews, topical reports, funny/light entertainment pieces, investigative reporting, sports stories or video diaries (items filmed and presented by Hands On viewers). Series twelve will also include feature length programmes on one topic.

The children's animation, Molly & Mr Milk, is aimed at improving literacy levels for deaf kids and introducing sign language and deaf awareness to hearing children. Twenty-six episodes brought Molly, a deaf girl and her pet cat, Mr. Milk, to a different "letter land" each week, where they discovered new words and signs. Four episodes on the theme of weather also appeared on Hands On in 2007.

Some popular stories that have recently appeared on Hands On include: video diaries from men and women's deaf sports teams competing in European Championships, hilarious presenter challenges such as signed busking on Dublin's main shopping street, interviews with residents of a house for adult deaf and deaf-blind people, reports on new developments in the field of health, a report debunking the myth that deaf people cannot be primary school teachers in Ireland, interviews with all political parties leading up to the Irish general election and interviews with deaf people who have traveled the world, are business owners, university students, historians, authors, sportsmen and women.
