= Harland Miller =

English writer & artist (born 1964)

- Born: 1964 (age 61–62); Yorkshire, England, United Kingdom
- Education: Chelsea College of Art and Design
- Occupations: Writer and artist
- Website: www.harlandmiller.com

Harland Miller (born 1964) is a writer and artist. He studied at Chelsea School of Art, graduating in 1988 with an MA.

Miller published his first novel Slow Down Arthur, Stick to Thirty, published by Fourth Estate, to critical acclaim in 2000. In the same year he published a novella titled At First I was Afraid, I was Petrified. Published by Book Works, the novella is a study of obsessive compulsive disorder. It is based on a hoard of hundreds of Polaroids found by Miller and taken by a relative of his, all of oven knobs all turned to “Off”.

Miller produces canvases based on Penguin Book covers. The titles include Whitby – The Self Catering Years, Rags to Polyester – My Story, York, So Good They Named It Once, and Incurable Romantic Seeks Dirty Filthy Whore.

== Exhibitions ==
- From 20 September to 24 November 2013 Miller had a solo exhibition in Amsterdam titled "Wherever You Are Whatever You're Doing This One's For You"
- An exhibition of Miller titled "York, So Good They Named It Once" opened at York Art Gallery on 14 February 2020. The show was due to run until May 2020 but closed early due to the Coronavirus Pandemic. A new exhibition at York Art Gallery, titled "XXX", opened on 14 March 2025. In advance of the exhibition Miller donated three new versions of his "Bad Weather Paintings" series to the gallery.

== See also ==
- List of British artists
- List of English novelists
- Miniature Museum
- York Art Gallery
