= Giovanni Battista Agucchi =

Italian churchman (1570–1632)

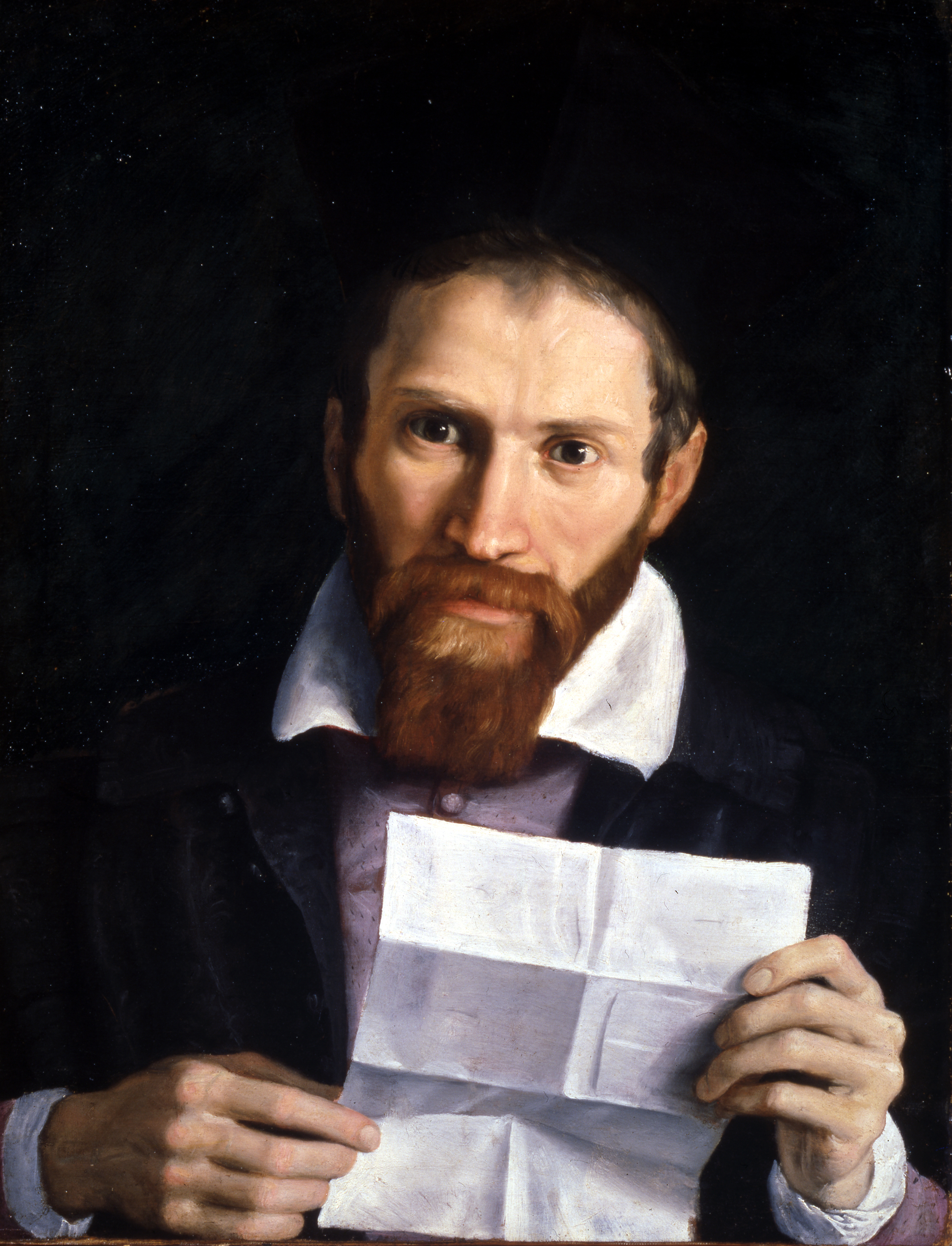
Portrait of Agucchi by Annibale Carracci, 1615–1620, York Art Gallery

Giovanni Battista Agucchi (20 November 1570 – 1 January 1632) was an Italian churchman, Papal diplomat and writer on art theory. He was the nephew and brother of cardinals, and might have been one himself if he had lived longer. He served as secretary to the Papal Secretary of State, then the Pope himself, on whose death Agucchi was made a titular bishop and appointed as nuncio to Venice.

He was an important figure in Roman art circles when he was in the city, promoting fellow Bolognese artists, and was close to Domenichino in particular. As an art theorist he was rediscovered in the 20th century as having first expressed many of the views better known from the writings of Gian Pietro Bellori a generation later. He was also an amateur astronomer who corresponded with Galileo.

== Career ==
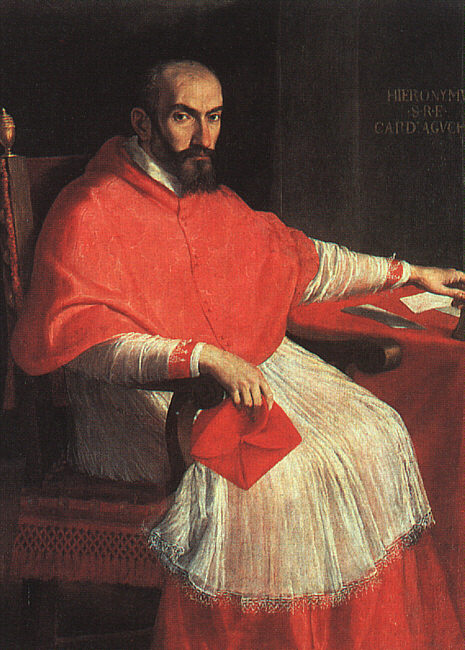
Domenichino, Portrait of Cardinal Girolamo Agucchi, older brother of Giovanni Battista, 1604–05

Agucchi was born into a noble family in Bologna. He began his career in 1580–82 assisting his much older brother Girolamo Agucchi (1555–1605), later briefly a cardinal from 1604 to 1605, who was governor of Faenza in the Papal States, then studied at Bologna and Rome. He was made a canon of Piacenza Cathedral, then from 1591 worked for his uncle Cardinal Filippo Sega, an important diplomat for the Papacy, accompanying him when Sega was papal nuncio (ambassador) to France, then returning with him to Rome in 1594, and continuing in his service until Sega's death in 1596.

He then followed his brother Girolamo into the service of Cardinal Pietro Aldobrandini, Papal Secretary of State, whose secretary was Girolamo. Aldobrandini was the nephew of Pope Clement VIII (r. 1592–1605). Agucchi accompanied Aldobrandini on his embassies to Florence and France, the latter to negotiate the Treaty of Lyon (1601) and the marriage of Henry IV of France, then in 1604 to Ravenna, where Aldobrandini had been made archbishop, with a trip to Ferrara in the same year. The death of Pope Leo XI and his replacement by Pope Paul V in 1605 meant the loss of papal favour for both men, and Agucchi was able to spend most of his time on his personal interests until 1615, when Aldobrandini returned to favour and office. He was also a protege of the art-loving Cardinal Odoardo Farnese, acting as his secretary.

Aldobrandini died in 1621 and Agucchi became secretary (Segretario dei Brevi) to the new Pope Gregory XV, also from Bologna, the same year. Gregory died in 1623 and the same year his successor Urban VIII made Agucchi Bishop of Amasea in partibus infidelis (a titular role, since Amasea is in Eastern Turkey), and appointed him as Apostolic nuncio to the Republic of Venice. Venetian politics were at this period highly polarized between pro- and anti-papal factions, and Agucchi's period largely coincided with the unstable reign of Doge Giovanni I Cornaro, (r. 1625–29) whose election Agucchi had striven for, but whose reign was something of a disaster. Agucchi left Venice in 1630 to avoid the plague, and died the following year in the Castello San Salvatore at Susegana, after a period in Oderzo.

== In the art world ==
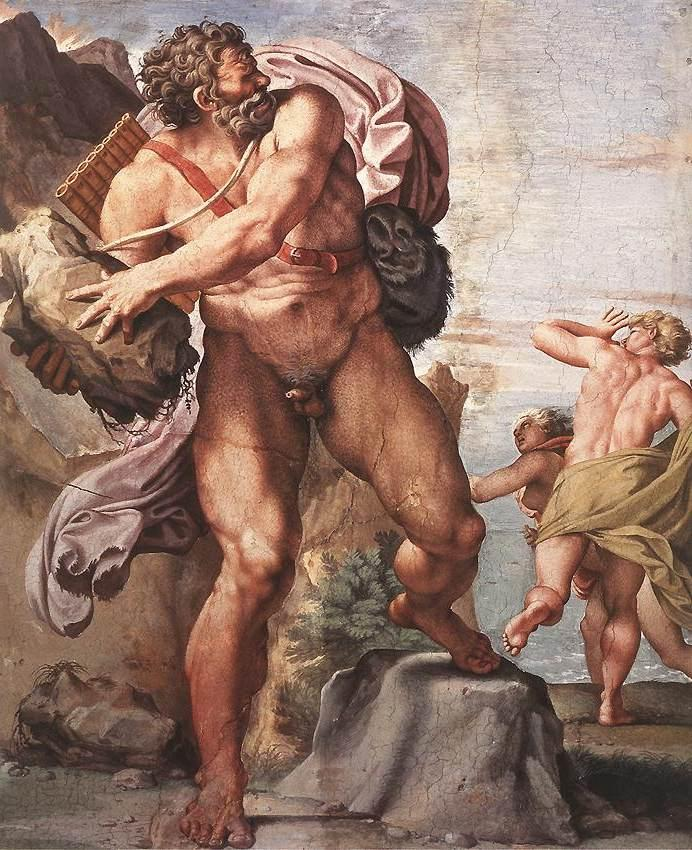
Annibale Carracci, the Cyclops Polyphemus in his frescos for the Palazzo Farnese

Agucchi was a cultivated intellectual, and the friend of many artists, playing a significant role in introducing painters from his native Bologna to patrons in the Roman Curia. He was "an assiduous correspondent on his own and others behalf", and many unpublished letters survive, as well as those quoted by Carlo Cesare Malvasia in his works. He frequently crops up in discussion of Roman commissions of the period, for example suggesting Ludovico Carracci to the authorities for an altarpiece in Saint Peter's, Rome, though without success. Annibale Carracci had his own recommendation to Cardinal Odoardo Farnese from the cardinal's brother Ranuccio I Farnese, Duke of Parma, but became a friend of Agucchi in Rome, and is held up as a model in his writings, which also contain important biographical information on the Carracci. Agucchi may have advised Carracci on the complicated and learned mythological iconography in his frescos of The Loves of the Gods for the cardinal's Palazzo Farnese, the dazzling scheme that was Carracci's first commission in Rome, and remains a landmark work for the Roman Baroque. He administered his last Holy Communion to Annibale before his premature death in 1609, and composed his epitaph for the Pantheon.

Domenichino joined Carracci in his work on the Palazzo Farnese, and Agucchi and his brother introduced him to Cardinal Pietro Aldobrandini and the future Gregory XV. Domenichino lived in Agucchi's household for a period from 1603/4 to 1608, and according to Bellori, one of the figures in Domenichino's fresco Meeting of St Nilus and Emperor Otto III (c. 1609–10; Grottaferrata Abbey, Cappella dei SS Fondatori) is a portrait of Agucchi.

Cardinals Odoardo Farnese and Pietro Aldobrandini were politically opposed, although less so after a marriage between the two families in 1600, but were the two leading supporters of Bolognese painting in Rome, who between them succeeded in effectively giving the Bolognese "almost a monopoly" of large commissions for palaces in the 1610s. Cardinal Aldobrandini's personal taste was for the Late Mannerist style of Giuseppe Cesari (the Cavaliere d'Arpino) and others, and his support of the Bolognese must be largely attributed to Agucchi's advocacy. The cardinal commissioned Domenichino to paint eight frescos with the story of Apollo for the Villa Aldobrandini outside Rome in 1616–18; they are now in the National Gallery, London. Agucchi's elder brother, Cardinal Girolamo, commissioned Domenichino to paint three frescos on the life of Saint Jerome in the portico of Sant'Onofrio in Rome, which are still in place. This was in 1604, completed 1605, at the time Domenichino was living with Agucchi. The church also contains Domenichino's portrait of the Agucchis' uncle, Cardinal Sega, on his memorial.

From Annibale Carracci Cardinal Aldobrandini commissioned a set of decorative frescos with religious subjects in landscapes for his palace in Rome, now containing the Doria Pamphilj Gallery and still in the family, the Domine, quo vadis? in the National Gallery, London, and a Coronation of the Virgin bought by the Metropolitan Museum of Art from the Mahon collection. By 1603 he owned six works by Carracci, including two of the above. The Bolognese artist Guercino only spent the years of Gregory XV's papacy in Rome, where his style changed in the direction of classicism. Denis Mahon suggested that this change was mainly in response to the urgings of Agucchi; like most commentators Mahon thought that the change was on the whole not an improvement. Eva-Bettina Krems suggests that Agucchi is a likely candidate for the connection that introduced the Lombard sculptor Ippolito Buzzi to Cardinal Ludovico Ludovisi, who provided a steady stream of work to him over several years.

=== Portrait in York ===
The fine and intimate portrait in York Art Gallery (illustrated) had always been attributed to Domenichino until an article in 1994 proposed that it was instead by Annibale Carracci, from around 1603; it was owned by Agucchi until his death. When the York gallery was closed for rebuilding in 2014–15 it was loaned to the National Gallery, London, and displayed there . Domenichino and Agucchi collaborated on the monument for Girolamo Agucchi in the church of San Giacomo Maggiore in Bologna, for which there are drawings in the British Royal Collection (Royal Library, MS. 1742).

== Writings ==
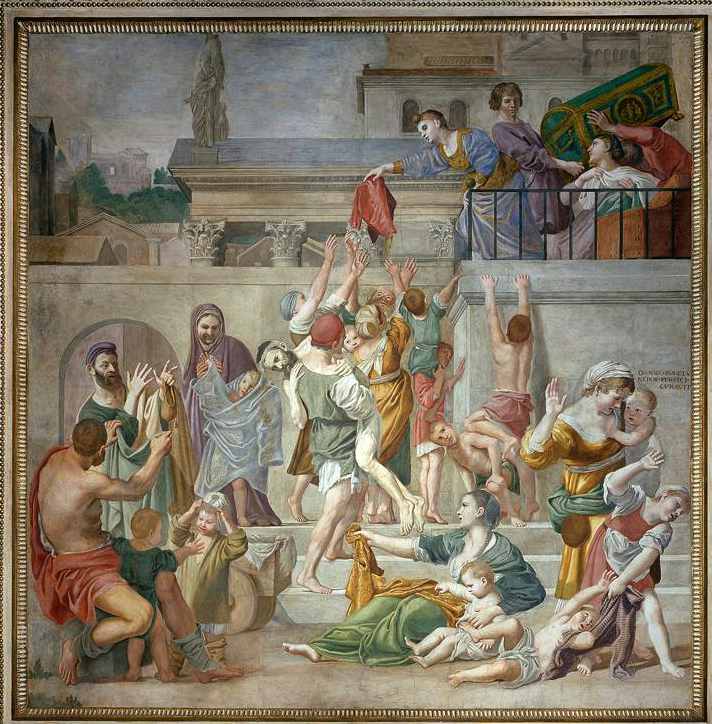
Domenichino, St. Cecilia Distributing Alms, fresco, 1612–15, San Luigi dei Francesi, Rome

Agucchi's main published writing is a very incomplete but nonetheless significant Trattato della pittura ("Treatise on painting"), probably written in 1615, whose manuscript is in the library of the University of Bologna (MS. 245), who also have an unpublished Latin biography of his brother Vita Hieronymi Agucchi (MS 75). The Trattato was published posthumously in Rome in 1646, using the pseudonym Gratiadio Machati, which Agucchi had used in his lifetime (a convention for a cleric writing on secular matters). It was included in the preface by G. A. Mosini, the pseudonym of Giovanni Antonio Massani, to a collection of prints after Annibale Carracci called Diverse figure al numero di ottanta ("Eighty different figures"). There is an English translation by Denis Mahon (1947), who did much to stimulate interest in Agucchi as a theorist who had been previously overlooked.

The Trattato "is a lively document on official Roman art circles during the years 1607–15 and concentrates specifically on exalting the idea della bellezza, which Agucchi identifies particularly in ancient sculpture." The work shows signs of having been influenced by discussions with Domenichino, reflecting a division of national and regional schools of painting that the latter claimed as his own in a letter, and is essentially that used until the 20th century, distinguishing in Italy the Roman, Venetian, Lombard, and Tuscan (Florentine and Sienese) schools. It has been suggested that the Trattato may have been in effect a collaboration, with the polished prose of Agucchi writing up Domenichino's thoughts, although this is mostly thought not to be the case.

Agucchi drew from Neoplatonist thought, in which "nature is the imperfect reflection of the divine, and the artist must improve upon it to achieve beauty", a view already conventional in the previous century. He held up classical sculpture, Raphael and Michelangelo as models, who had observed from "nature" but selected and idealized what they depicted, and deprecated the Mannerists. Annibale Caracci in particular had rescued art from their artificiality, returning to depicting improved nature. The naturalism of Caravaggio and his followers was also deplored.

The period was generally lacking in writing on art theory, apart from the series of lectures for the Accademia di San Luca by Federico Zuccari, its first president. These were published as L'idea de' Pittori, Scultori, ed Architetti (1607), and have been called "the swan song of the subjective mysticism of Mannerist theory". The lectures themselves were abandoned when the first were received with hostility by the Bolognese and Caravaggisti alike. The Idea may have provoked Agucchi into beginning his own work. Despite its delayed and obscure publication, Agucchi's ideas represent the earliest exposition of "the classical-idealist theory" that was to be dominant in most of the Roman art world in the 17th century.

The younger antiquary Francesco Angeloni, was a close friend who had also worked for the Aldobrandini, in his case Pope Clement VIII, and owned at least a copy of the York portrait. Angeloni raised his nephew Gian Pietro Bellori (1613–1696), introducing him to Agucchi and the Bolognese artists in Rome. Bellori was to follow many of Agucchi's ideas in his own very influential writings on art.

Silvia Ginzburg has pointed out that an earlier piece by Agucchi, Descrizione della Venere dormiente di Annibale Carrazzi ("Description of Annibale Carracci's Sleeping Venus"), written around 1603 but not published until 1678, shows rather different attitudes to painting, appreciating the rapidity of Carracci's style and his ability to paint without first drawing – neither qualities the Trattato approves of. She suggests that reaction to the style of Caravaggio accounts for the change, which may also be referred to in a letter by Agucchi of 1603.

Agucchi was also interested in astronomy and mathematics, and a member of the Accademia dei Gelati of Bologna. He had a long correspondence with Galileo Galilei in 1611–13, including passing on the data from his own astronomical observations, and lectured on the satellites of Jupiter in 1611; Galileo had made the first recorded observations of these in 1609.
