= Sleeping Venus (Carracci) =

Painting by Annibale Carracci

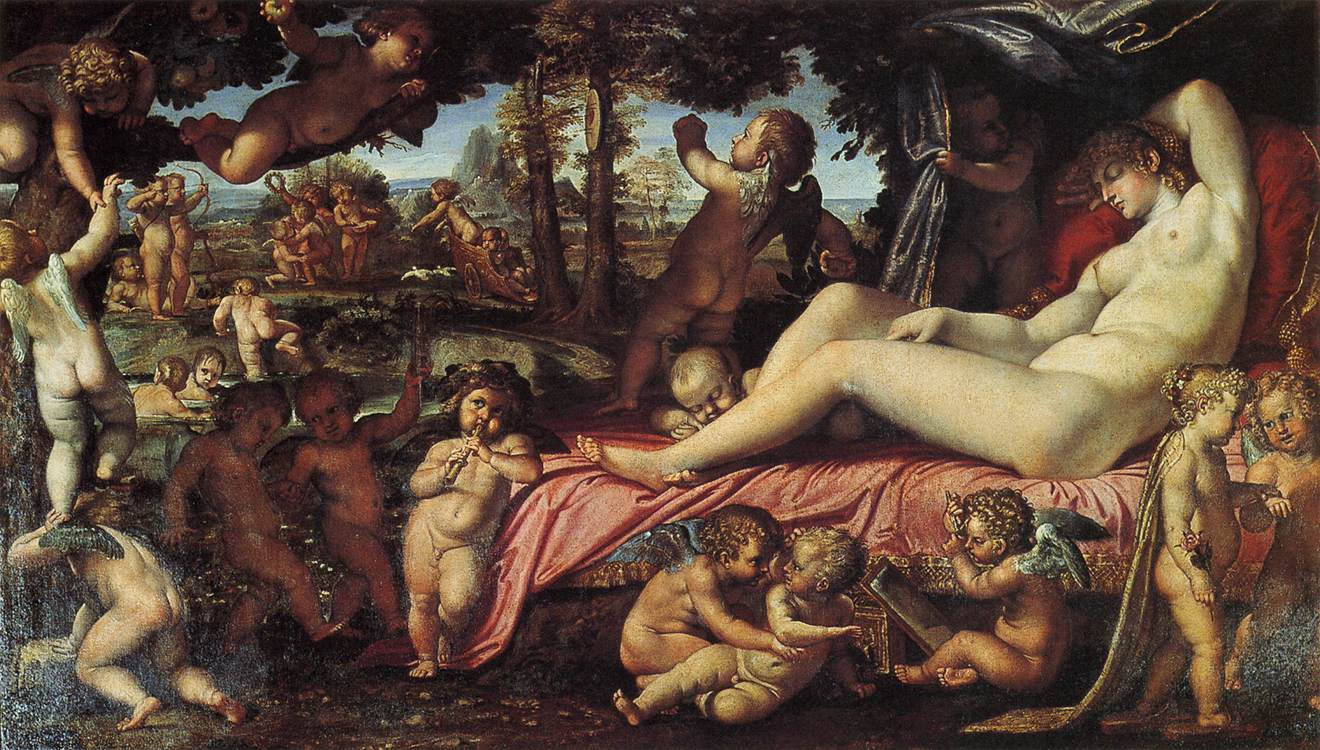
- Artist: Annibale Carracci
- Year: c. 1603
- Medium: Oil on canvas
- Subject: Venus and putti
- Dimensions: 190 cm × 328 cm (75 in × 129 in)
- Location: Musée Condé; Chantilly, Oise, France

Sleeping Venus (also known as Sleeping Venus with Putti) is a painting created c. 1603 by the Italian artist Annibale Carracci, now in the Musée Condé in Chantilly, Oise, France. This oil painting measures 190 x 328 cm. The painting depicts Venus sleeping with her arm above her head as putti frolic around her. Carracci painted Sleeping Venus for Odoardo Farnese. Giovanni Battista Agucchi wrote an ekphrasis of this painting that Carlo Cesare Malvasia included in his book Life of the Carracci. In The Lives of the Modern Painters, Sculptors and Architects, Giovanni Pietro Bellori wrote a description of the painting that paraphrases Agucchi's ekphrasis without citation.

== Bibliography ==
- Fried, Michael (2010). The Moment of Caravaggio. Princeton University Press. ISBN 978-0691147017.
- Lattuada, Riccardo (2001). Keith Christiansen; Judith Walker Mann (eds.). "Artemisia in Naples and London: 1629-52". Orazio and Artemisia Gentileschi. Metropolitan Museum of Art. ISBN 1588390063.
- Summerscale, Anne (2000). Malvasia's Life of the Carracci: Commentary and Translation. Penn State University Press. ISBN 0271044373.
- van Gastel, Joris (2013). Il Marmo Spirante: Sculpture and Experience in Seventeenth-Century Rome. Walter de Gruyter. ISBN 978-3050059488.
- Weststeijn, Thijs (2008). The Visible World: Samuel Van Hoogstraten's Art Theory and the Legitimation of Painting in the Dutch Golden Age. Amsterdam University Press. ISBN 978-9089640277.
- Witte, Arnold Alexander (2008). The Artful Hermitage: The Palazzetto Farnese as a Counter-Reformation Diaeta. L'Erma di Bretschneider. ISBN 978-8882654771.
- Wohl, Hellmut. Giovan Pietro Bellori: The Lives of the Modern Painters, Sculptors and Architects.
