= York Art Gallery =

Public art gallery in England

- York Art Gallery and statue of William Etty
- Established: 1882
- Location: Exhibition Square, York, England
- Coordinates: 53°57′47″N 01°05′11″W
- Type: Art museum
- Accreditation: Arts Council England Accredited Museum
- Key holdings: British Studio Pottery, Views of York, William Etty
- Collections: Western European paintings, British paintings, prints, watercolours, drawings, ceramics
- Visitors: 81,402 (2018–19)
- Director: Kathryn Blacker
- Curator: Dr Beatrice Bertram
- Architect: Edward Taylor
- Owner: York Museums Trust
- Website: yorkartgallery.org.uk

Listed Building – Grade II
- Official name: City Art Gallery
- Designated: 1 July 1968
- Reference no.: 1257852

York Art Gallery is a public art gallery on Exhibition Square in York, England, with a collection of paintings from 14th-century to contemporary, prints, watercolours, drawings, and ceramics. It closed for major redevelopment in 2013, reopening in summer of 2015. The building is a Grade II listed building and is managed by York Museums Trust.

== History ==
=== Foundation and development ===
The gallery was created to provide a permanent building as the core space for the second Yorkshire Fine Art and Industrial Exhibition of 1879, the first in 1866 having occupied a temporary chalet in the grounds of Bootham Asylum. The 1866 exhibition, which ran from 24 July to 31 October 1866 was attended by over 400,000 people and yielded a net profit for the organising committee of £1,866. A meeting of this committee in April 1867 committed to "applying this surplus in providing some permanent building to be devoted to the encouragement of Art and Industry".

The result was the development of a second exhibition, housed in a newly constructed building designed by a York architect named Edward Taylor; a series of 189 drawings, watercolours and sketches for the proposed gallery were produced by Taylor in the period 1874–1878. The architectural plan for the building changed considerably during this time, from an 'Elizabethan' style to an 'Italian' style – neither were fully realised in the final design. The building first opened on 7 May 1879.

The site for the 1879 exhibition was an area in the grounds of the medieval St Mary's Abbey known as 'Bearparks Garden'. It is fronted by what became Exhibition Square, which was cleared by the demolition of a house and the former Bird in Hand Hotel. The art gallery consisted of an entrance hall, central hall, north and south galleries and on the upper floor a Grand Picture Saloon. Its intended grand classical façade decorated with 18 stone figures, a carved tympanum and 14 mosaics was not done for financial reasons and it was decorated instead with two tiled panels representing 'Leonardo expiring in the arms of Francis I', and 'Michaelangelo showing his Moses', together with four ceramic roundels depicting York artists William Etty (painter), John Carr (architect), John Camidge (musician), and John Flaxman (sculptor). To the rear of the building was a large temporary exhibition hall with machinery annex. The exhibition hall itself measured 200 ft (61 m) by 90 ft (27 m) and had aisles on each side with galleries above. A large organ was placed in the building, originally built in 1862 by William Telford of Dublin. The roof of the building was over 60 ft (18 m) above. Each side of the covered way between the hall and the stone building was used for refreshments with a cafe on one side and a first-class lounge on the other. A large cellar was excavated below in order to store liquor for these rooms.

The exhibition hall was intended to be used only for three years, but remained in use for meetings, concerts and other functions until 1909 and was not demolished until the Second World War.

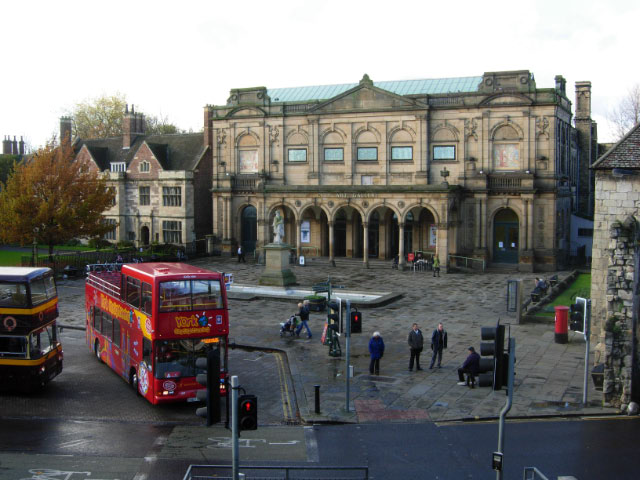
The Gallery situated within Exhibition Square

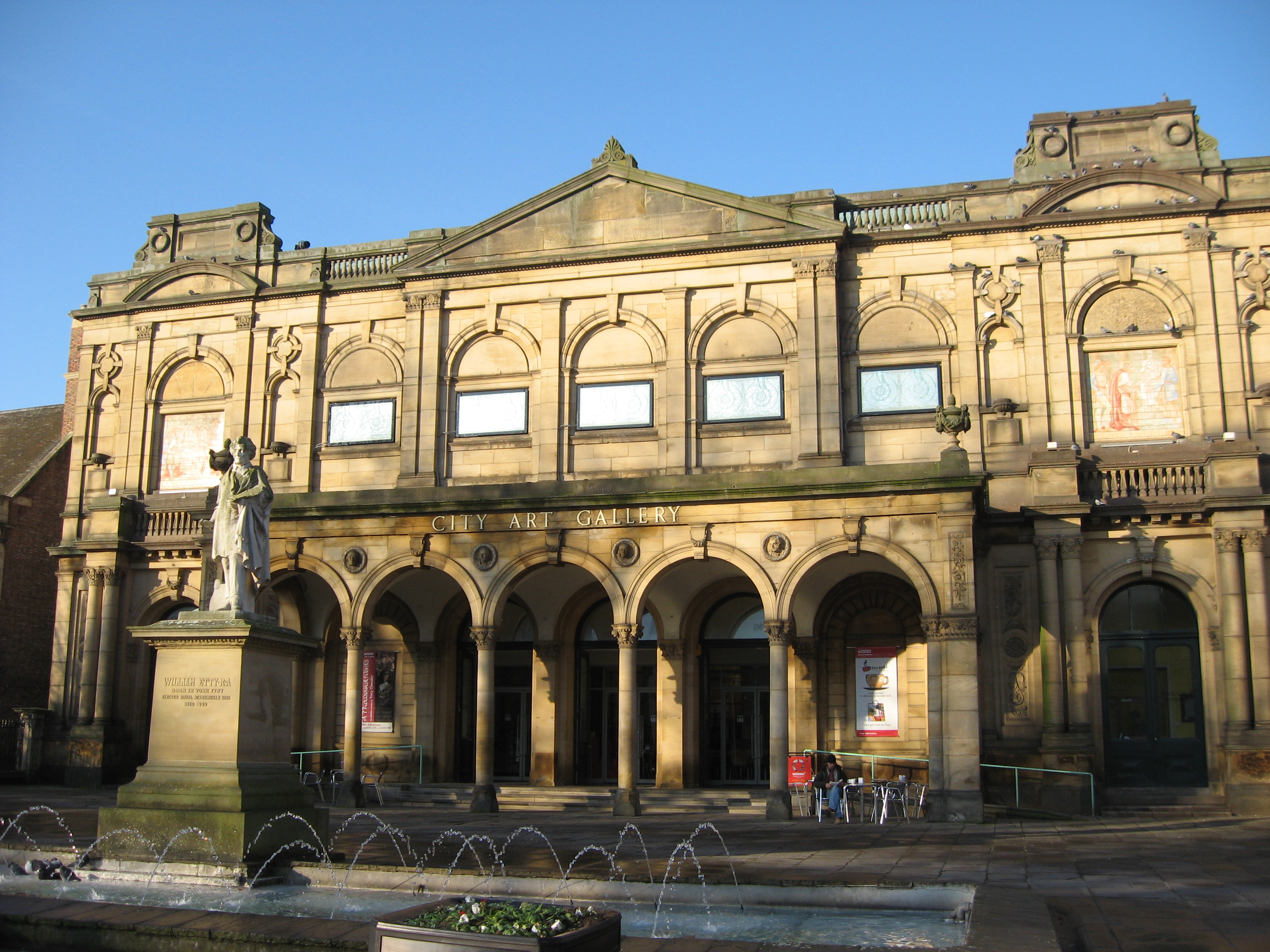
Front elevation

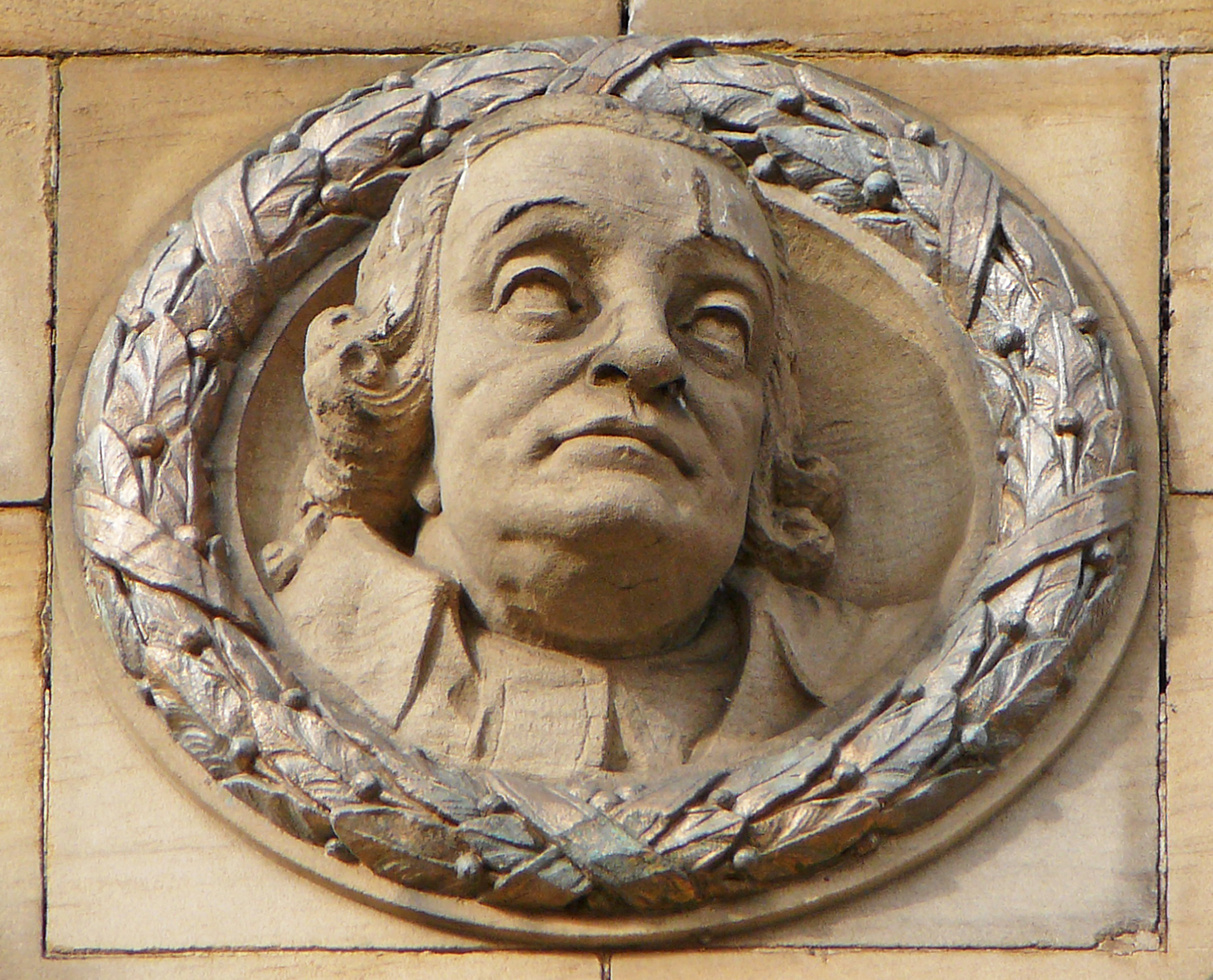
Sculpted roundel on the front elevation

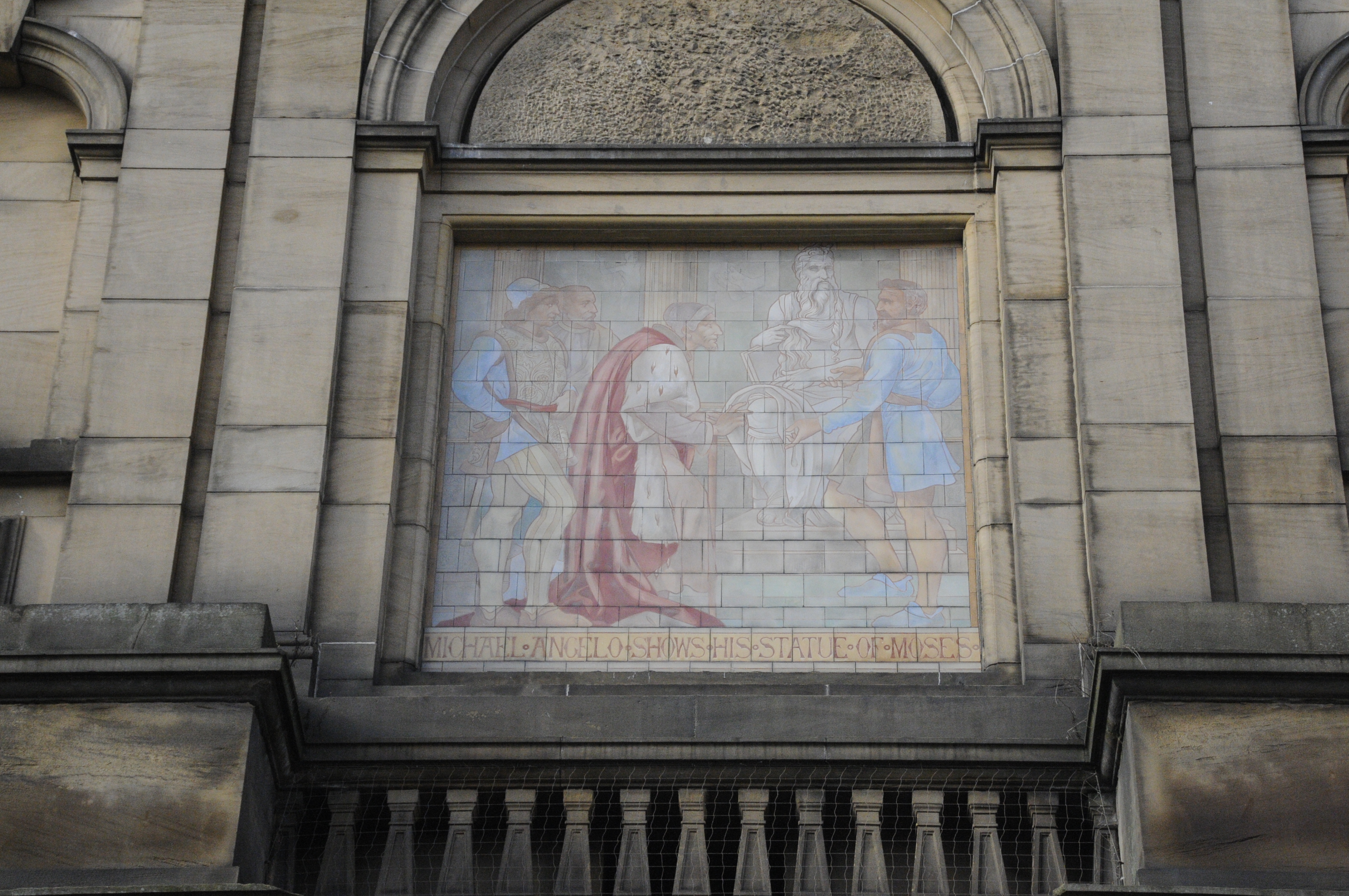
Mosaic panel on the front elevation

Statue of William Etty

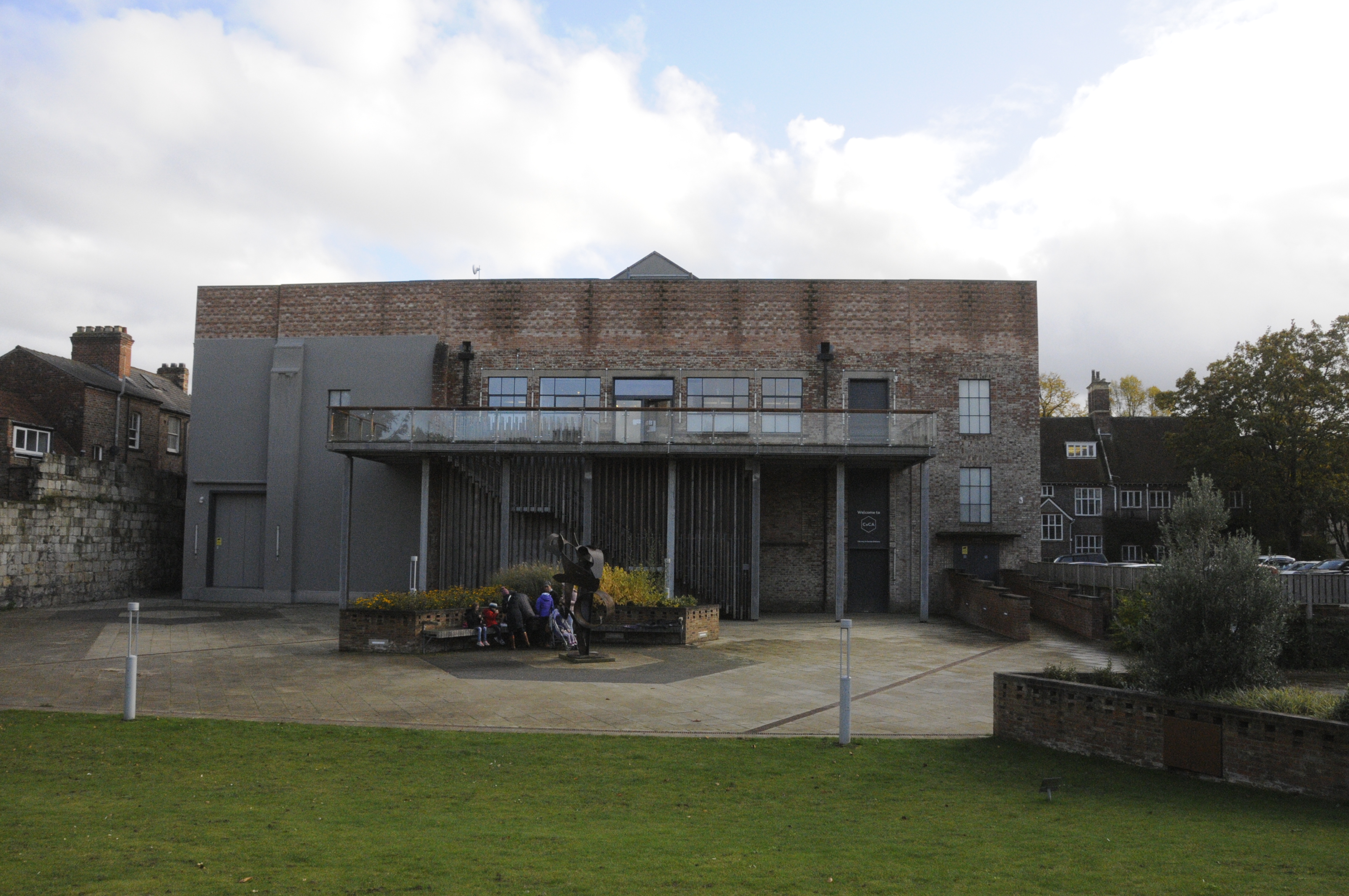
Rear elevation

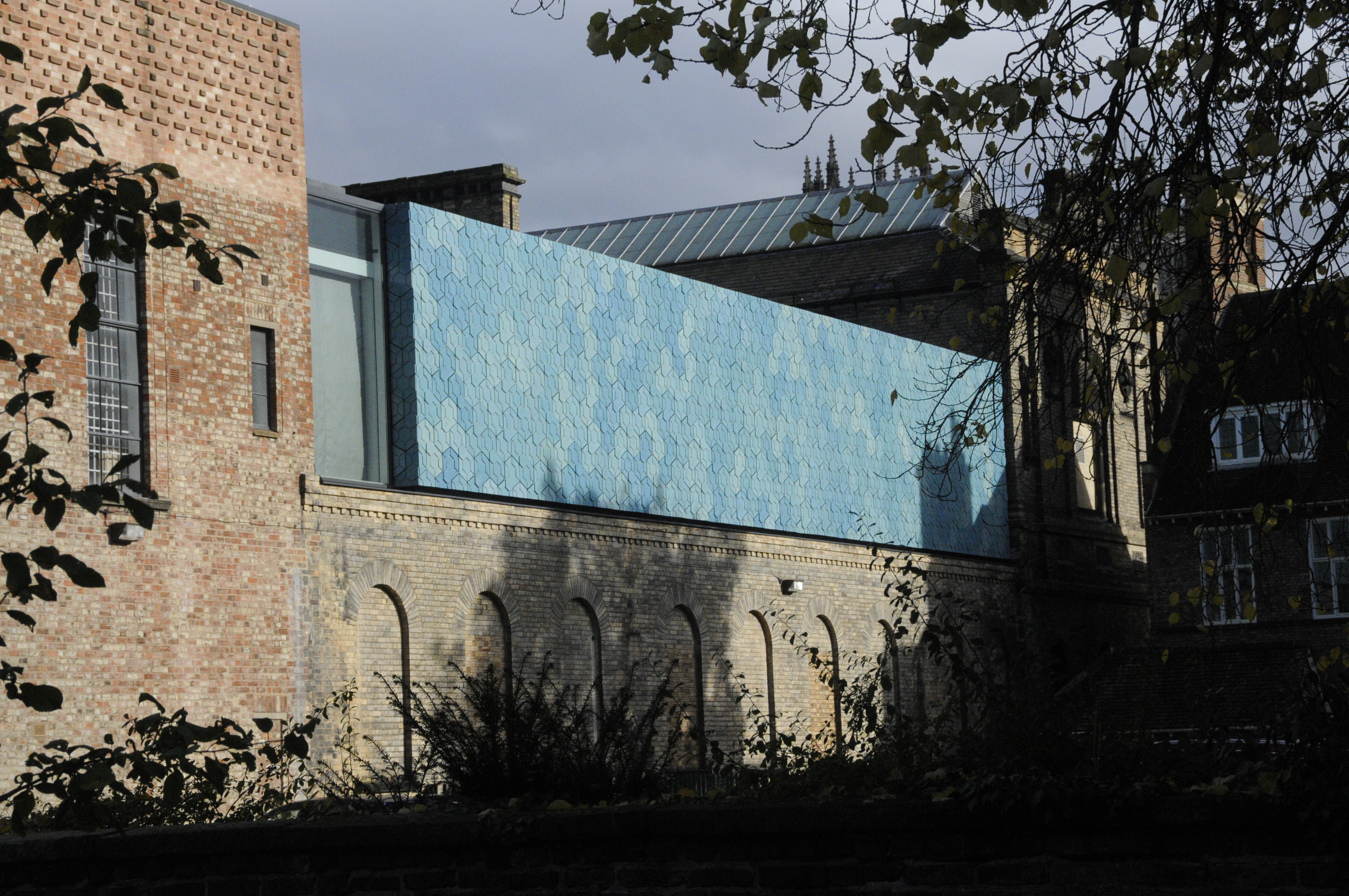
West elevation

Following the 1879 exhibition the renamed Yorkshire Fine Art and Industrial Institution aimed to create a permanent art exhibition. It was given a major boost by the bequest of York collector John Burton (1799–1882) of more than one hundred 19th-century paintings, supplemented by gifts and in the early years two major temporary loan collections. In 1888 the north galleries were leased to York School of Art, which moved there in 1890 from Minster Yard.

York City Council purchased the buildings and collection in 1892. Temporary summer exhibitions ceased in 1903 but a major exhibition of the work of York artist William Etty was held in 1911 when his statue by local sculptor George Walker Milburn was erected outside.

In 1888 the north wing was leased to York Art School which added a further storey in 1905, and after that the wing was vacated by the school. It housed the city archives from 1977 to 2012.

=== Second World War ===
The period up to the commencement of the Second World War was one of modest growth, the major event being purchase of the Dr William Arthur Evelyn collection of prints, drawings and watercolours of York in 1931. The building was requisitioned for military purposes at the outbreak of the Second World War and closed, suffering bomb damage during the Baedeker Blitz on 29 April 1942.

=== Post-War ===
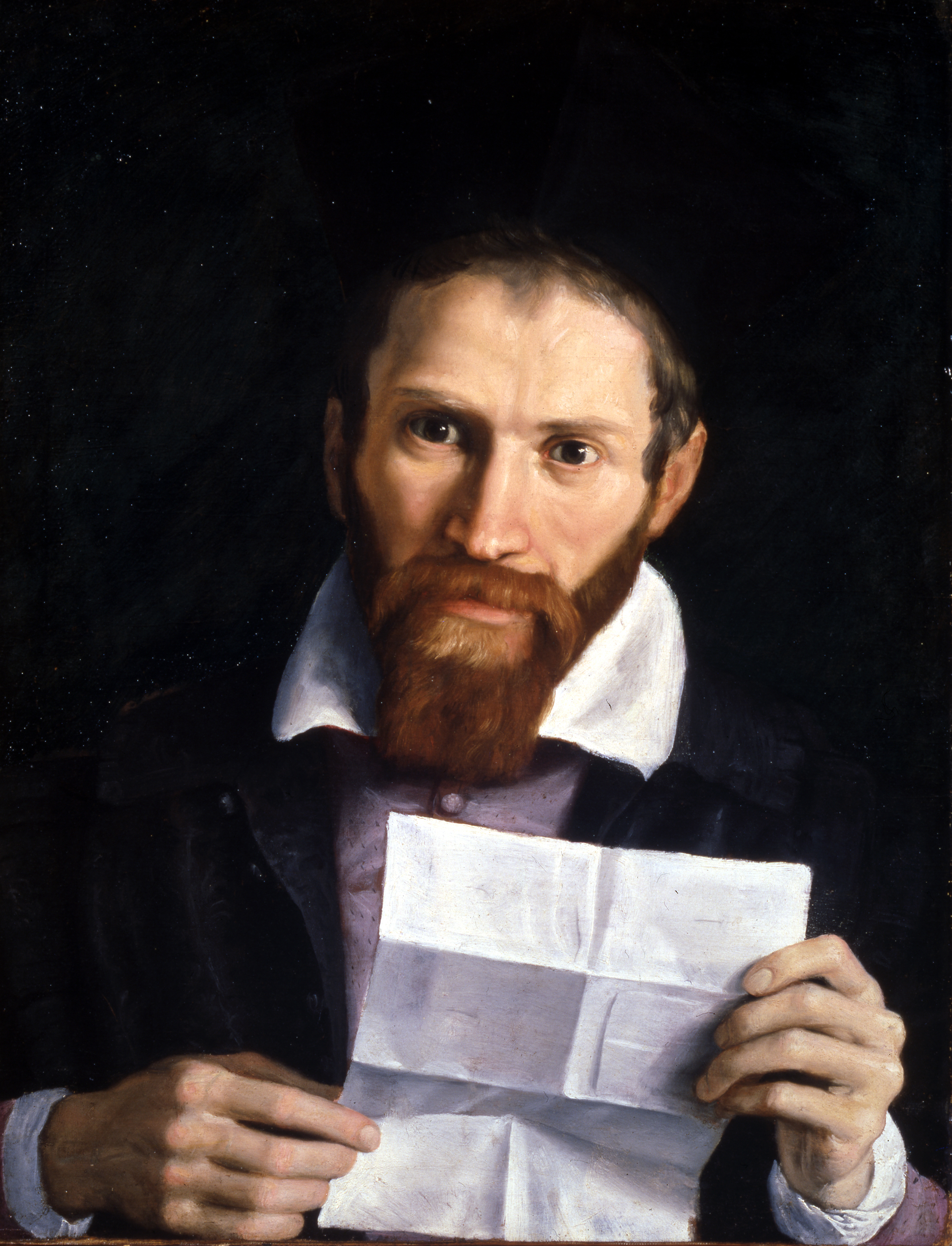
Portrait of Giovanni Battista Agucchi by Annibale Carracci, 1615–1620

The gallery reopened in 1948 with a small temporary exhibition before a major restoration in 1951–52 after which began a major revival of fortune under the direction of Hans Hess. He made important acquisitions with the assistance of the York Art Collection Society founded in 1948 (later Friends of York Art Gallery) and the National Art Collections Fund, and then in 1955 the donation of FD Lycett Green's collection of more than one hundred continental Old Master paintings. As a result of the systematic build up under Hess and his successors, the gallery has a British collection especially of late-19th-century and early-20th-century works with some French works representative of influential styles.

In 1963 the gallery was given Eric Milner-White's collection of studio pottery.

=== Later 20th century ===
In 1979 a 15th-century painting of the Angel Gabriel and five saints by an artist of the Nuremberg School was stolen from the gallery. It was recovered and returned to the gallery in 2023 after an auction house in Dorchester linked it to a listing on the Art Loss Register.

In the 1990s and 2000s the collection was supplemented by other major donations and loans, most notably those of WA Ismay and Henry Rothschild (1913–2009).

==== 1999 robbery ====
In January 1999 the gallery was victim of an armed robbery, during which staff were tied up and threatened, and over £700,000 of paintings were stolen. At closing time, four members of staff were threatened by two men bearing pistols and wearing ski masks. They took a watercolour by J. M. W. Turner from a display case and 19 other paintings from the walls, cutting some of those from their frames.

The main perpetrator, Craig Townsend, was arrested by armed police when he, and another man, arrived at an arranged meeting with an art dealer to sell the stolen paintings. He was sentenced to 14 years in jail at York Crown Court in February 2000 for the robbery.

=== 21st century ===
The gallery underwent a £445,000 refurbishment in 2005, reopening on 19 March. This development was supported by a £272,700 grant from the Heritage Lottery Fund and £85,000 from the City of York Council.

A restoration in 2013–15 cost £8 million, and was undertaken to increase display space by some 60%, including reincorporation of the north wing, an upper-floor extension to the south wing, and reorganisation of the internal space for exhibition and storage. The development enabled the area to the rear of the building to be restored to public use as part of the Museum Gardens. The reopened gallery houses the British Studio Ceramics on the upper floor. The gallery reopened on 1 August 2015, charging an admission fee for the first time since 2002. The first year after the gallery reopened with a new charging structure saw visitor numbers fall by over 120,000 to 91,896 compared to the year 2011–2012 when there was no admission charge.

During the 2020 exhibition of paintings by Harland Miller ("Harland Miller: York, So Good They Named it Once") it was reported that commemorative posters sold in the Art Gallery gift shop were being resold online for up to £1,000. The posters depicted a reworked version of Miller's 2009 work 'York – So Good They Named It Once'; part of his 'Pelican Bad Weather' series of humorous book covers.

In November 2020 the gallery announced that it had acquired works following a successful application to the Derbyshire School Library Service, which had owned the works but closed in 2018. The works acquired are by four British artists: Prunella Clough, Margaret Mellis, Marion Grace Hocken, and Daphne Fedarb.

In January 2024 the gallery announced that it would be charging for entry fees once again. It had changed from a charged-entry to a free-entry model after the first COVID-19 lockdown in England, but a 2023 review of this showed that it was revealed that the move was costing £200,000 per year in lost income.

=== COVID-19 pandemic ===
During the COVID-19 pandemic the gallery, along with the other York Museums Trust sites, closed to the public on 23 March 2020. It was announced in July that the gallery would reopen on 1 August (Yorkshire Day) 2020 and that it would not charge visitors. The gallery was forced to close a second time from 5 November 2020 as part of new national restrictions in England. It reopened on 1 December 2020, but York was moved into Tier 3 Restrictions on 31 December 2020, forcing the gallery to close again. In March 2021 it was announced that the Art Gallery would reopen on 28 May to coincide with the launch of a new exhibition 'Grayson Perry: The Pre-Therapy Years'.

== Collection ==
=== Paintings ===
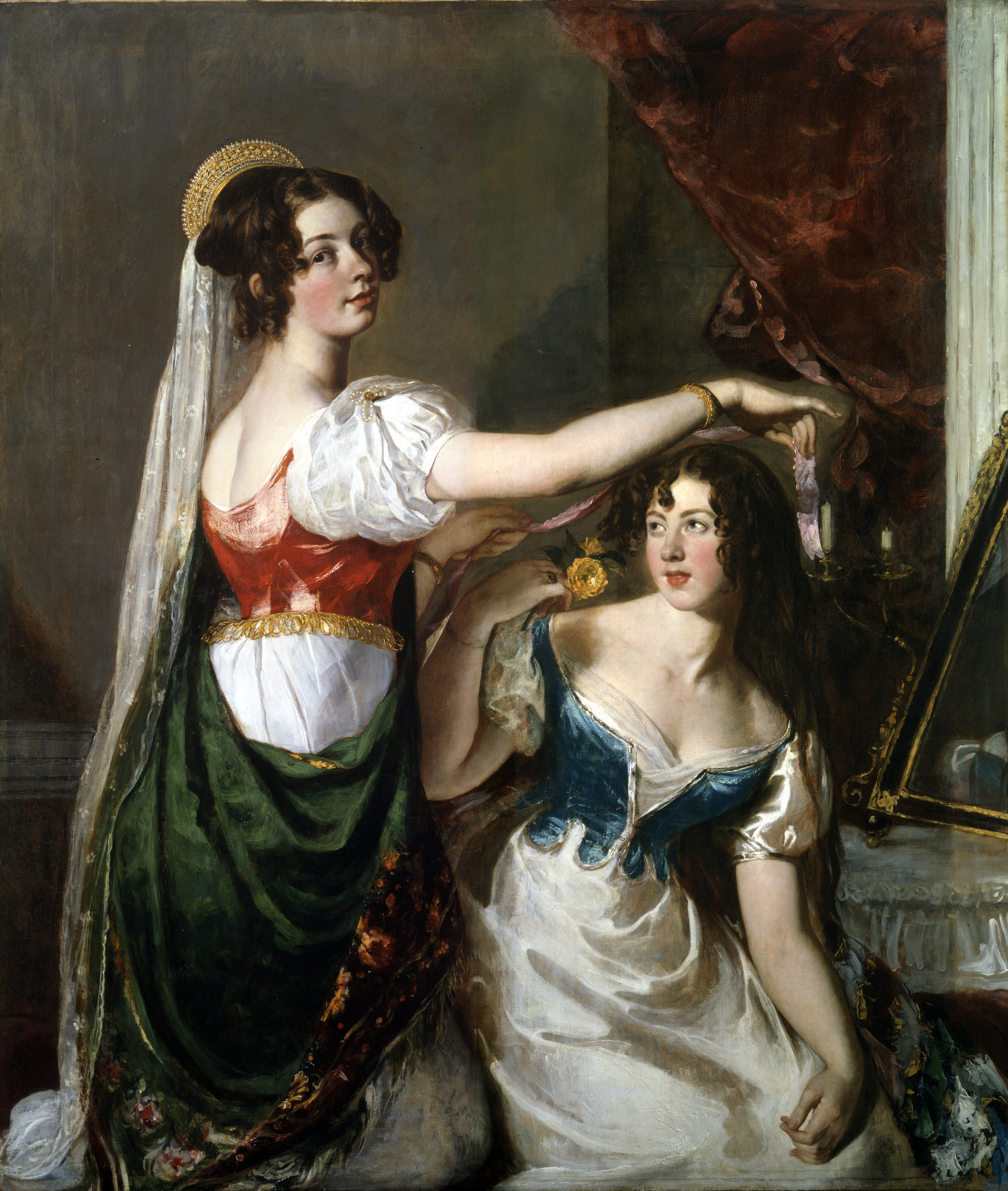
Preparing for a Fancy Dress Ball, William Etty, 1835

The gallery has more than 1,000 paintings. Western European paintings include 14th-century Italian altarpieces, Annibale Carracci's early 17th-century Portrait of monsignor Giovanni Battista Agucchi, 17th-century Dutch morality works, and 19th-century works by French artists who were predecessors and contemporaries of the Impressionists. British paintings date from the 16th century onward, with 17th and 18th-century portraits and paintings by Giambattista Pittoni and vedutas by Bernardo Bellotto, Victorian morality works and early 20th-century work by the Camden Town Group associated with Walter Sickert being particularly strong. Among the contemporaries, Paul Nash, L. S. Lowry and Ben Nicholson and the Swiss-born Luigi Pericle. Amongst York born artists the gallery has the largest collection of works by William Etty and good paintings by Albert Moore. Henry Keyworth Raine, the great nephew of William Powell Frith, gifted various works, including a portrait of George Kirby (1845–1937), the First Curator of York Art gallery. In 2025 Harland Miller donated three new versions of his 'Bad Weather Paintings' series.

=== Studio pottery ===
The gallery holds a collection of British studio ceramics with more than 5,000 pieces. They include works by Bernard Leach, Shoji Hamada, William Staite Murray, Michael Cardew, Lucie Rie, Hans Coper, Jim Malone and Michael Casson.

=== Works on paper ===
The collection of more than 17,000 drawings, watercolours and prints is particularly strong in views of York, with more than 4,000 examples, largely watercolours and drawings, some by local artists such as Henry Cave, John Harper, John Browne and Patrick Hall. Watercolour artists represented include Thomas Rowlandson, John Varley, Thomas Girtin, J. M. W. Turner, and 20th-century painters Edward Burra, John Piper and Julian Trevelyan. The gallery holds the William Etty archive.

=== Decorative arts ===
There are more than 3,000 decorative objects particularly from Yorkshire potteries from the 16th century to the early 20th century, Chinese and Korean pottery from the 18th and 19th century, and glassware.

== Notable staff ==
Lead curators and directors
Name	Title	Dates in Post	Reference
George Kirby	Curator	1879–1931	
Hans Hess	Curator	1947–1967	
John Ingamells	Curator	1967–1977	
Richard Green	Curator	1977–2003	
Caroline Worthington	Curator of Art	2003–2008	
Laura Turner	Curator of Art	2008–?2017	
Vera Pavlova	Senior Curator of York Art Gallery	2017–2018	
Beatrice Bertram	Senior Curator of York Art Gallery	2018 – current	

Other notable curators
Name	Title	Dates in Post	Reference
Peter Tomory	Assistant Curator	1950–1956	

== Exhibitions in York Art Gallery ==
Many exhibitions have taken place in the gallery, of varying sizes and length. The exhibition schedule from 2020 onwards has included a mix of touring exhibitions and internal exhibitions, often linked to wider events in the city and internationally.

== Awards ==
- Visit York Tourism Awards: Visitor Attraction of the Year 2016 (Over 50,000 Visitors category) (winner).
- Art Fund: Museum of the Year 2016 (finalist).
- Kids in Museums: Family Friendly Museum Award 2016 (winner).
- European Museum Forum: European Museum of the Year 2017 (nominated). Special commendation received.
- Museums + Heritage Awards: Partnership of the Year 2020 (winner).
- Visit York Tourism Awards: Event, Festival or Cultural Experience of the Year 2025 (winner).

== See also ==
- Listed buildings in York (outside the city walls, northern part)
