= Miniature Museum =

Museum of miniature artworks

The Miniature Museum of Modern and Contemporary Art was founded by Ria and Lex Daniels in 1990. It was initially located at the AMC hospital in Amsterdam, but moved to the Kunstmuseum Den Haag in 2013, where it was on a long-term loan for five years.

== History ==
The Collection of the Miniature Museum is based on the private collection of Ria and Lex Daniels, Amsterdam art collectors and retired gallery owners. In the late 70s, the Daniels began to collect miniature artworks for their private collection. These works were initially displayed on a wall in their private home, but a renovation pushed them to reconsider what to do with their collection. What started out as a spontaneous idea, quickly turned into a serious endeavor, and by 1990 they had devised a plan for a miniature museum. The Miniature Museum was officially established in 1990. In the following three decades, a large number of artists were invited to contribute to the growing collection of the Miniature Museum. Since early on, the museum has been linked to the Medical Cancer Research Foundation, supporting the foundation with donations. On December 2, 1997 the mayor of Amsterdam opened the miniature museum at the pediatric oncology department at the AMC hospital in Amsterdam Zuid-oost. From 2013 to 2018, the Miniature Museum was housed in the Kunstmuseum Den Haag. A new building was specifically built to house the miniature collection. The exhibition in the new building was curated by the Daniels in close collaboration with the Dutch curator Wim van Sinderen. Due to the size of the miniature collection, which ranged in the 2000s, a part of the collection could not be displayed at the Kunstmuseum Den Haag. Instead, the Haags Historisch Museum exhibited this part of the collection from 2017 to 2018.

== Collection ==
The collection of the Miniature Museum consists of around 2000 miniature artworks by more than 1050 artists, who have made an artwork especially for the museum. Two-dimensional works in the collection generally measure between 10 x 10 cm and 9 x 12 cm, while sculptures are limited to 10 x 10 x 20 cm. Nevertheless, a few exceptions have been made.

The museum has works by internationally recognized artists, including Arman, César, Daniel Spoerri, Jonathan Lasker, Edward Kienholz, Sam Francis, Christo, Dennis Oppenheim, Sol LeWitt, George Baselitz, Roy Lichtenstein, Robert Mangold, Jenny Holzer, Annie Leibovitz, Sandro Chia, A.R. Penck, Andres Serrano, Karel Appel, Carl Andre, Panamarenko, Robert Longo, Kenny Scharf, Günther Förg, Allen Jones, Bettina Rheims, Ed Rucha, Richard Artschwager, Tetsumi Kudo, Peter Halley, Marlene Dumas, Keith Haring, Anton Corbijn, Louise Bourgeois, Peter Beard, Imi Knoebel, Damien Hirst, Lawrence Weiner, David Levinthal, and many more.

The collection's recent acquisitions include works by Ali Banisadr, Anish Kapoor, Angel Otero, Arnaldo Pomodoro, Daido Moriyama, Donald Baechler, Enoc Perez, Erwin Olaf, Harland Miller, Inez van Lamsweerde and Vinoodh Matadin, Larry Bell, Martin Parr, Pat Steir, Taryn Simon, Tauba Auerbach, Tom Sachs, Urs Fischer, Yinka Shonibare, and Zhang Huan.

== Building ==
The first building to house the Miniature Museum at the AMC was designed by Ria and Lex Daniels themselves. In 2013 a new building was built in context of the Miniature Museum's exhibition at the Gemeentemuseum Den Haag. It was inspired and based on an early design by Theo van Doesburg of the Dutch art movement De Stijl and was constructed by the exhibition architects Kossman DeJong.

== Visitors ==
The museum has attracted over 1.000.000 visitors so far.

All proceeds made in the sale of the catalogue have been donated to the Medical Cancer Research Foundation. Together with anonymous donations, the Miniature Museum has raised a large amount of money for the foundation. The museum is planning to publish a second volume of the catalogue in 2020.

In 1997 the Miniature Museum was awarded the Guinness World Record for the smallest museum in the world. It has since been featured in the Guinness book of records as such, opposite the largest museum in the world, the Hermitage.
