= George Kirby =

George Kirby may refer to:

- George Kirbye (c. 1565–1634), English composer
- George Kirby (curator) (1845–1937), British academic and curator of the York Art Gallery
- George Hughes Kirby (1875–1935), American physician and psychiatrist
- George Kirby (comedian) (1923–1995), American comedian, singer, and actor
- George Kirby (footballer) (1933–2000), English football player and manager
- George Kirby (baseball) (born 1998), American baseball player
