= George Kirby (curator) =

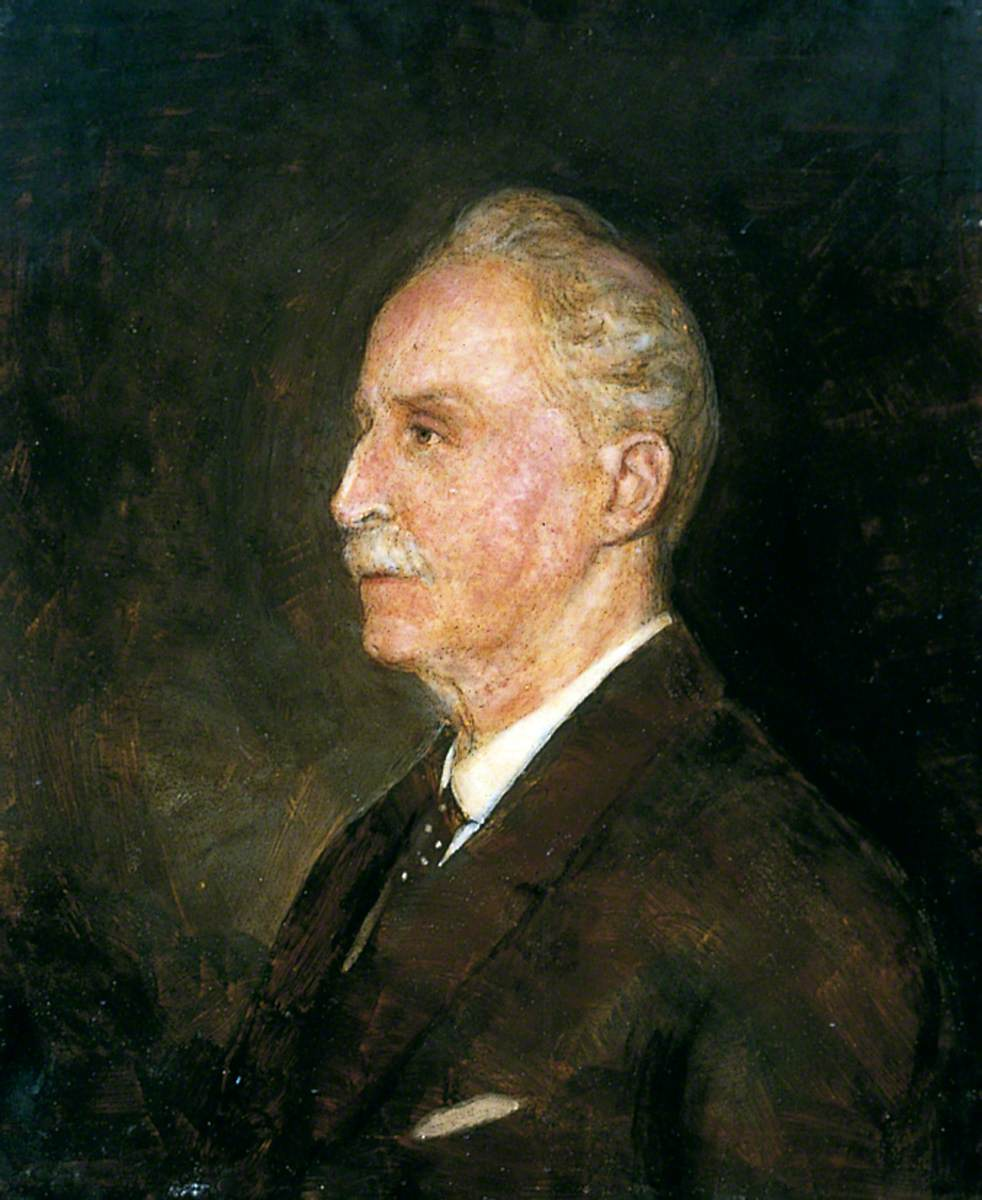
- Born: 1845
- Died: 1937 (aged 91–92)
- Occupations: Lecturer; Musician; Curator

George Kirby (1845–1937) was a British academic who served in York, England, as the first curator of York Art Gallery.

Kirby was a lecturer in music and concert arranger before, in 1879, taking on the role of Curator of the Art Gallery and Superintendent of the buildings associated with the 1879 Yorkshire Fine Art and Industrial Exhibition. He remained in this role for 52 years, retiring at the age of 90.

A 1925 portrait of Kirby by Henry Keyworth Raine is in the collection of the York Art Gallery.
