= Richard Green (curator) =

Art curator and art historian

Richard Green is a British art curator and art critic.

== Biography ==
Green was Keeper of fine art at the Laing Art Gallery from 1971 to 1977. One of his early acquisitions for Newcastle was Laus veneris by Edward Burne-Jones. In 1977 he became the curator of York Art Gallery, a post he held until 2003 when he left to become an independent art historian. As curator at York Art Gallery, Green was present during the armed robbery of January 1999 in which staff were tied up and threatened, and over £700,000 of paintings were stolen.

Green is an honorary visiting fellow in the Department of Art History at the University of York. He was elected as a Fellow of the Society of Antiquaries of London in 2014.

== Select publications ==
- 1990 (with Murray H and Riddick S). York through the Eyes of the Artist. York City Art Gallery.
- 2011. 'Etty and the Masters' in S. Burnage, M. Hallett and L. Turner, eds, William Etty: Art and Controversy. London.
- 2012. 'Paul Sandby's young Pupil identified', Burlington Magazine 144.
