= Filippo Sega =

Catholic bishop

His Eminence Filippo Sega
- Bishop of Piacenza
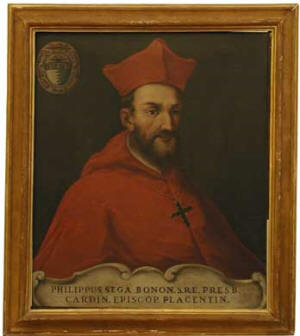
- Church: Roman Catholic Church
- Diocese: Piacenza
- See: Piacenza
- Appointed: 3 October 1578
- Term ended: 29 May 1596
- Predecessor: Tommaso Gigli
- Successor: Claudio Rangoni
- Other post: Cardinal-Priest of Sant'Onofrio (1594-96)
- Previous posts: Bishop of Ripatransone (1575-78); Apostolic Nuncio to Spain (1577-81); Apostolic Nuncio to Austria-Hungary (1586-87)

Orders
- Consecration: 29 June 1575 by Gabriele Del Monte
- Created cardinal: 18 December 1591 by Pope Innocent IX
- Rank: Cardinal-Priest

Personal details
- Born: Filippo Sega; 22 August 1537 Bologna, Papal States
- Died: 29 May 1596 (aged 58) Rome, Papal States
- Buried: Sant'Onofrio al Gianicolo
- Education: University of Bologna

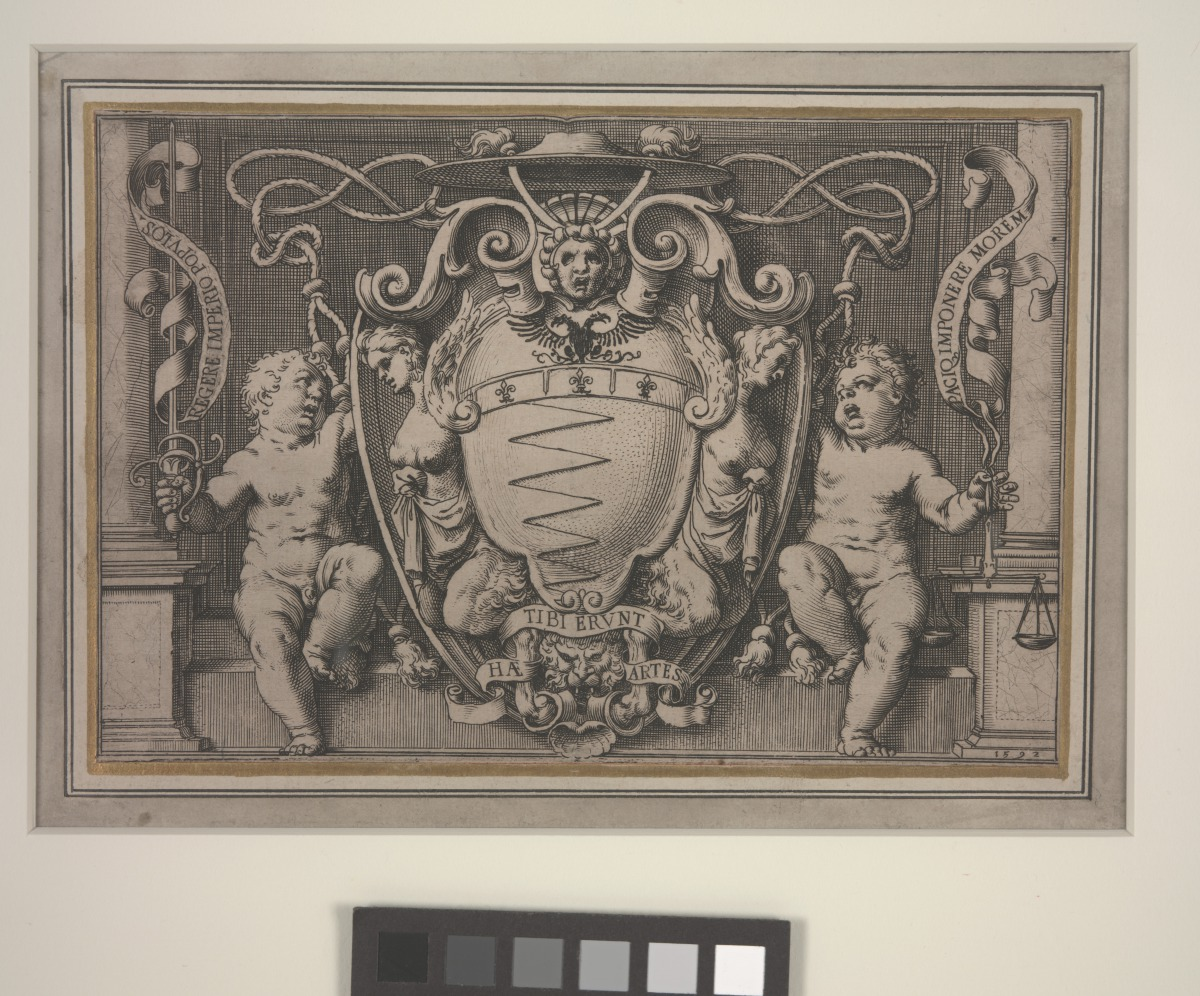
Coat of Arms of Cardinal Filippo Sega, attributed to Agostino Carracci

Filippo Sega (22 August 1537 – 29 May 1596) was a Catholic bishop from 1575 to 1596 and a cardinal from 1591 to 1596. He served as a papal diplomat in several important and sensitive posts, in Flanders, Spain, Vienna, Prague, and France.

== Biography ==
Sega was born in Bologna on August 22, 1537, the son of a noble family originally from Ravenna. His sister, born Isabella Sega, was the mother of Cardinal Girolamo Agucchi and the diplomat Bishop Giovanni Battista Agucchi, who worked under Sega at the start of his career.

He was educated at the University of Bologna, where he became a doctor of both laws on September 26, 1560.

After completing his doctorate, he became a protonotary apostolic. He was named governor of Cesena on September 20, 1566; governor of Forlì on January 24, 1569; governor of Imola on March 3, 1571; of Romagna on December 15, 1572; and of the March of Ancona on January 1, 1575.

=== Bishop ===
On May 20, 1575, Sega was "elected" (provided) as the second Bishop of Ripatransone by Pope Gregory XIII. He was consecrated a bishop by Gabriele del Monte, Bishop of Iesi, in Osimo Cathedral on June 29, 1575. On Oct. 3, 1578, while he was still in Spain, he was appointed Bishop of Piacenza.

=== Diplomat ===
In 1577, Sega was sent as a special envoy to John of Austria in the County of Flanders. His mission was to aid Don Juan in the pacification of the Spanish Netherlands, which was the property of the Crown of Spain, to stop the advance of Protestantism, and to prepare in secret the expedition for the conquest of England. He was only in Flanders a few months when the papal Nuncio to Spain, Niccolò Ormaneto, became gravely ill and died on 23 February 1577. On 1 July 1577 a dispatch from the papal Secretary, Cardinal Filippo Guastavillani, the Pope's nephew, ordered Sega to Spain as the new Nuncio, and on 8 July Pope Gregory signed the necessary documents. There were numerous matters pending between the Papacy and the King of Spain, not the least of which was the choice of new bishops for the dioceses of Toledo and Cuenca. Sega was Nuncio in Spain until 30 April 1581. He took his leave of King Philip at Lisbon in December 1581.

In Spring 1582, Bishop Sega was back in his diocese, but on 20 September 1583, he received a letter from Cardinal Guastavillani, appointing him to another mission to Spain. He sailed from Genoa on the 25th, and was in Madrid on 11 October. He was to attempt to get King Philip II to revive the league with Venice and the Papacy against the Turks; he was to revive Gregory XIII's enterprise against England; he was to persuade the King to support Prince Ernest of Bavaria, who had been chosen Archbishop of Cologne but who was being resisted by the schismatic heretic Otto von Truchses and Prince Casimir. On 24 November 1583 the Spanish response was given by Cardinal de Granvelle: the league was refused; the King was committed to the English expedition, but circumstance were unfavorable at the time; the Catholics of Cologne were being supported by the Prince of Parma, to the extent that his commitments in the Netherlands made it possible, but in any case, the Elector Ernest would have to pay the expenses, since the King could not. Bishop Sega left the Spanish court at the end of January 1584, but fell ill at Barcelona, and did not arrive in Italy until June. He was dispensed from the necessity of traveling directly to Rome to make his report to the Pope.

A new pope, Sixtus V (Felice Peretti) was elected on 24 April 1585. His program for his papacy included the reform of the clergy of the city of Rome, and, for that purpose, on 29 July 1585 he chose two bishops with a reputation for reform in their own dioceses, Giulio Ottinelli of Castro and Filippo Sega of Piacenza. The assignment of the "Monsignori Riformatori" was to carry out an official visitation of all the churches and colleges in Rome; each member of the clergy who held a benefice of any kind was summoned to give an account of himself. The English, German, Greek, and the Maronite Colleges were visited, as well as the Roman Seminary and the Lateran Basilica. Unfortunately, Sega's work was interrupted when he was again pressed into diplomatic service.

He served as Nuncio to the Holy Roman Emperor Rudolf II in Vienna from January 18, 1586 until May 28, 1587. Back in his diocese, he organized and presided over a diocesan synod, held on 3 May 1589.

After the assassination of Henry III of France on 2 August 1589 by a fanatical monk, Pope Sixtus acted with lightning speed and appointed an embassy to the new Catholic king of France, the Cardinal Charles de Bourbon (Charles X), and his League. The new papal legate a latere was Cardinal Enrico Caetani, and he was accompanied by Bishop Filippo Sega with the title of Nuncio. The embassy of more than 200 persons left Rome on 2 October 1589. Sega was promoted to Legate on 15 April 1592 on the withdrawal of Caetani, and continued to serve until 12 March 1594.

=== Cardinal ===
In the consistory of December 18, 1591, Pope Innocent IX named Bishop Sega a cardinal priest. Sega had been given the endorsement of William V, Duke of Bavaria. Due to his service in France, he was not assigned a titular church until his return, when, on 5 December 1594, he received the red hat and became the Cardinal-Priest of Sant'Onofrio. He did not participate in the papal conclave of 1592 that elected Pope Clement VIII.

He became president of the Congregatio Germanica (the German affairs committee) in the Papal Curia in 1595. Worn out by work and importunities, however, he retired to a villa outside the Porta Pinciana above Trastevere, where he died.

Cardinal Filippo Sega died in Rome on 29 May 1596 and is buried in his titular church of Sant' Onofrio.

== Bibliography ==
- Biaudet, Henry (1910). Les nonciatures apostoliques permanentes jusqu'en 1648 (Helsinki: Suomalainen tiedeakatemia, Helsingfors), p. 286. (in French)
- Cardella, Lorenzo (1793). Memorie storiche de' cardinali della santa Romana chiesa (in Italian). Vol. Tomo quinto (5). Roma: stamperia Pagliarini. pp. 322–324.
- Gulik, Guilelmus (1923). Eubel, Conradus (ed.). Hierarchia catholica (in Latin). Vol. Tomus 3 (second ed.). Münster: Libreria Regensbergiana.
- Fernández Collado, Angel (1991). Gregorio XIII y Felipe II en la nunciatura de Felipe Sega (1577-1581): aspectos político, jurisdiccional y de reforma (in Spanish). Toledo: Estudio Teologico San Ildefonso. pp. 27–34. ISBN 978-84-404-9050-6. (in Spanish)
- Florencio del Niño Jesus (1934), "Monseñor Sega," in: Mensajero de Santa Teresa (Madrid 1934), pp. 278–282.(in Spanish)
- Gachard, M. (1864). "Une visite aux Archives et à la Bibliothèque royales de Munich," in: Compte rendu des séances de la Commission Royale d'Histoire ou recueil de ses bulletins (in French and Italian). Bruxelles, Belgie: Kiessling. 1864. pp. 25–218.
- Molinari, F. (1976). "Il card. Filippo Sega, vescovo di Piacenza e San Carlo Borromeo (1574–1584)." in: Ricerche storiche sulla Chiesa Ambrosiana 6 (Milano 1976) 199-201. (in Italian)
- Reichenberger, Robert, ed. (1905). Die nuntiatur am Kaiserhofe: Germanico Malaspina und Filippo Sega. Nuntiaturberichte aus Deutschland (1585-1590), Zweite Abteilung, Erste Hälfte (in German and Latin). Paderborn: Schöningh.
