= Girolamo Agucchi =

Catholic cardinal

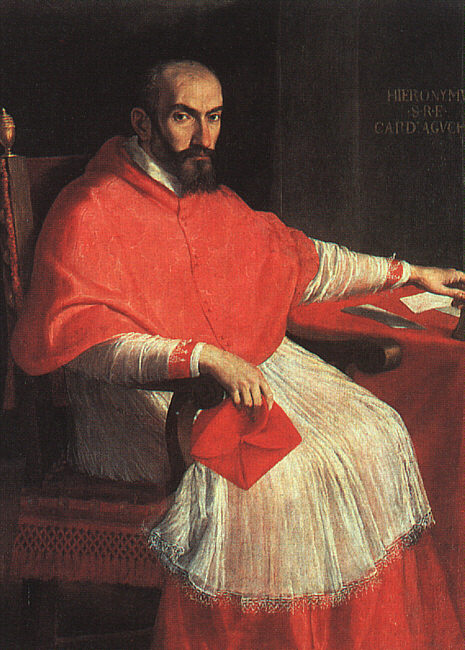
Portrait of Girolamo Agucchi by Domenichino.

Girolamo Agucchi (15 January 1555 – 27 April 1605) was a Catholic cardinal from 1604 to 1605.

== Biography ==
Agucchi was born in Bologna on January 15, 1555, the son of Gian Giorgio Agucchi and Isabella Sega. His mother was the sister of Cardinal Filippo Sega, and Giovanni Battista Agucchi was his brother.

He was educated at the University of Bologna, receiving a doctorate in law.

After university, he became a notary of the Holy See. On April 15, 1592, Pope Clement VIII made him a protonotary apostolic. He was then made papal envoy to the County of Flanders. In 1595, he became Referendary of the Apostolic Signatura. He became vice-governor of Fermo on September 20, 1596. On November 1, 1597, he became the majordomo of Cardinal Pietro Aldobrandini. He traveled to Ferrara with the cardinal in 1598. In 1600, he became Secretary of the Sacred Congregation of Bishops and Regulars.

In the consistory of June 9, 1604, Pope Clement VIII made him a cardinal priest. On June 25, 1604, he received the red hat and the titular church of San Pietro in Vincoli. He participated in the papal conclave of March 1605 that elected Pope Leo XI.

He died in Rome on April 27, 1605, and is buried in San Pietro in Vincoli.
