= Henry Keyworth Raine =

British painter

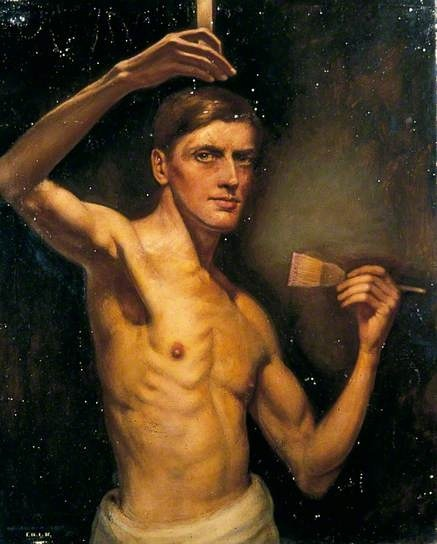
Self-portrait (as Diogenes) by Henry Keyworth Raine

Henry Keyworth Raine (1872–1934) was a British portraitist.

== Life ==
Born in York, he was the son of the Reverend James Raine and Ann Jane Keyworth; and the great nephew of William Powell Frith,

In 1895, according to a newspaper report in the York Herald, Raine was commissioned to paint the portrait of Princess Louise, Duchess of Argyll, the sixth child of Queen Victoria, at Kensington Palace. Raine, on his own account, began painting portraits by candlelight in 1897. In 1901, a portrait of Francis Foljambe by Raine, and a self-portrait, were hanging at Osberton Hall.

Raine was described in newspapers as "The cellar artist". Stories about his method of painting in the dark were printed. The techniques he employed in his underground studio off Hanover Square, Westminster were stated to be an effort to recreate the style and results of artists he admired, such as Titian, Rembrandt and Velazquez. Painting by candlelight, using only three colours on his palette and using special black canvas, Raine was able to complete a portrait in five hours, meaning the sitter would only need to visit his studio on one occasion. A newspaper report of 1904 stated that he never exhibited, and had painted portraits of Henry Edwyn King-Tenison, 9th Earl of Kingston and Charles Innes-Ker.

York Art Gallery contains examples of his work.
