= Caroline Worthington =

Caroline Worthington (born 1972) is a British curator, museum director and director of the Royal Society of Sculptors.

== Biography ==
Worthington was curator of art at the Royal Albert Memorial Museum in Exeter as curator of art before moving to the Laing Art Gallery in Newcastle. In 2003, aged 31, she moved to York Art Gallery as curator of Art, leaving in 2008 to become the director of the Florence Nightingale Museum in London.

Worthington is the director of the Royal Society of Sculptors and chief executive of Bexley Heritage Trust.

In 2019 she was the guest curator of an exhibition titled 'Parallel Lines: Drawing and Sculpture' at The Lightbox.

== Select publications ==
- 2000. Exeter's fine art. Exeter, Exeter City Museums.
- 2005. 'Relaxation and edification' : dealing in Dutch drawings. Paul Getty Museum.
