= Klainguti =

- Type: Pastry shop and café
- Industry: Confectionery
- Founded: 1828
- Founders: Klainguti brothers

Klainguti is an Italian pastry shop and café, which is located in the historic centre of Genoa, Italy, between Piazza Soziglia and Piazza Campetto. The establishment was founded in 1828 by four brothers of the Klainguti family, pastry makers from Pontresina in the Swiss canton of Graubünden.

== History ==
The four Klainguti brothers arrived in Genoa during the nineteenth century intending to continue their journey to the Americas. According to historical accounts concerning the establishment, their departure was delayed and they opened a pastry shop in the city instead, beginning a business that continued for nearly two centuries.

The pastry shop became associated with the commercial life of Genoa's historic centre and was listed among the city's historic shops. Over time, ownership changed, and the business was later managed by the Ubaldi family.

In 2020, the company entered bankruptcy proceedings after a period of financial difficulties. The closure was reported by the Genoese newspaper Il Secolo XIX, which also described the historical background of the establishment and its connection with the Klainguti family tradition.

The business was subsequently restored and reopened following a change in management and restoration work on the premises. Since June 2025, the company has been owned by the French pastry chef, Michel Paquier, and the Italian entrepreneur, Carlo Ponte, through the Gruppo Douce.

== Premises and products ==
The shop is located in Genoa's medieval historic centre. The entrance, windows and external sign have been modified over time while retaining elements inspired by the original nineteenth-century appearance.

The interior decoration includes historic wood panelling, mirrors and decorative elements. Some restoration work, including decorative panels by the Genoese artist, Attilio Mangini, was carried out in the twentieth century.

Klainguti produces traditional pastries associated with Genoese and Swiss confectionery traditions. Some traditional French sweets are also produced. Among the products historically associated with the establishment are the cakes known as Engadina and Zena, as well as pastries, fruit jellies and almond-based biscuits.

== Association with Giuseppe Verdi ==
The pastry shop has a historical association with the composer Giuseppe Verdi, who lived in Genoa for extended periods during the later part of his life. Local historical accounts state that Verdi was a customer of Klainguti and that the establishment created a brioche named Falstaff in reference to his opera of the same name, first performed in 1893.

According to the tradition preserved by the pastry shop, Verdi sent a note of appreciation to the Klainguti brothers, which is displayed inside the establishment. The attribution of the note is generally reported in local sources describing the history of the café.

== Cultural significance ==
Klainguti is included among the historic commercial establishments of Genoa, as a part of its gastronomic and cultural heritage.
