= Giovanni Paolo Panini =

Italian painter and architect (1691–1765)

- Louis Gabriel Blanchet, Portrait of Giovanni Paolo Pannini, 1736, oil on canvas, 97 x 76 cm, priv. col.
- Born: 17 June 1691; Piacenza, Duchy of Parma, Holy Roman Empire
- Died: 21 October 1765 (aged 74); Rome, Papal States (now Italy)
- Other name: Gian Paolo Panini/Pannini
- Education: Giuseppe Natali; Andrea Galluzzi; Francesco Galli Bibiena; Benedetto Luti; Andrea Locatelli
- Notable work: Ancient Rome; Modern Rome; Roman Capriccio: The Pantheon and Other Monuments; The Lottery in Piazza di Montecitorio
- Movement: Baroque
- Children: Giuseppe Pannini; Francesco Panini

Giovanni Paolo, also known as Gian Paolo Panini or Pannini (17 June 1691 – 21 October 1765), was an Italian Baroque painter and architect who worked in Rome and is primarily known as one of the vedutisti ("view painters"). As a painter, Panini is best known for his vistas of Rome, in which he took a particular interest in the city's antiquities. Among his most famous works are his view of the interior of the Pantheon (on behalf of Francesco Algarotti), and his vedute – paintings of picture galleries containing views of Rome. Most of his works, especially those of ruins, have a fanciful and unreal embellishment characteristic of capriccio themes. In this they resemble the capricci of Marco Ricci. Panini also painted portraits, including one of Pope Benedict XIV.

== Biography ==
=== Early life and training ===
Giovanni Paolo Panini was born in Piacenza on 17 June 1691. As a young man, he trained in his native town, under Giuseppe Natali and Andrea Galluzzi, and with stage designer Francesco Galli Bibiena. A book of drawings dated 1708 (Piacenza, Biblioteca Passerini-Landi) probably belongs to this period of his training. In 1711, he moved to Rome, where he studied drawing with Benedetto Luti and took lessons in landscape painting from Andrea Locatelli. His first signed work is a canvas depicting the Flight into Egypt (Genoa, priv. col.), which is influenced by Flemish landscape painting, particularly the work of the brothers Pieter and Jan Frans van Bloemen, and of the Dutch vedutista Caspar van Wittel.

In Rome, Panini earned a name for himself as a decorator of palaces. His earliest commissions came from Cardinal Giambattista Patrizi and from Elisabeth Farnese, who, in 1714, had become the second wife of Philip V of Spain. Their patronage, together with the high quality of his work, quickly spread Panini's fame in Italy and abroad. In 1719, Panini was admitted to the Accademia dei Virtuosi al Pantheon. That same year, he was became a member of the Accademia di San Luca, Rome's oldest and most distinguished academy of art. Panini taught perspective at the Accademia for several years and was elected its principe (director) in 1754.

In 1724 he married Caterina Gosset, sister-in-law of Nicolas Vleughels, director of the French Academy in Rome, with whom he had two sons: the architect Giuseppe (1720‒1812), and the painter Francesco (1745‒1812), who collaborated with their father and were deeply influenced by his art. The fact that in 1732 Panini was accepted as a member of the French Academy in Rome and assigned to teaching optics testifies to the extent of his fame by this time.

=== Work as an easel painter ===
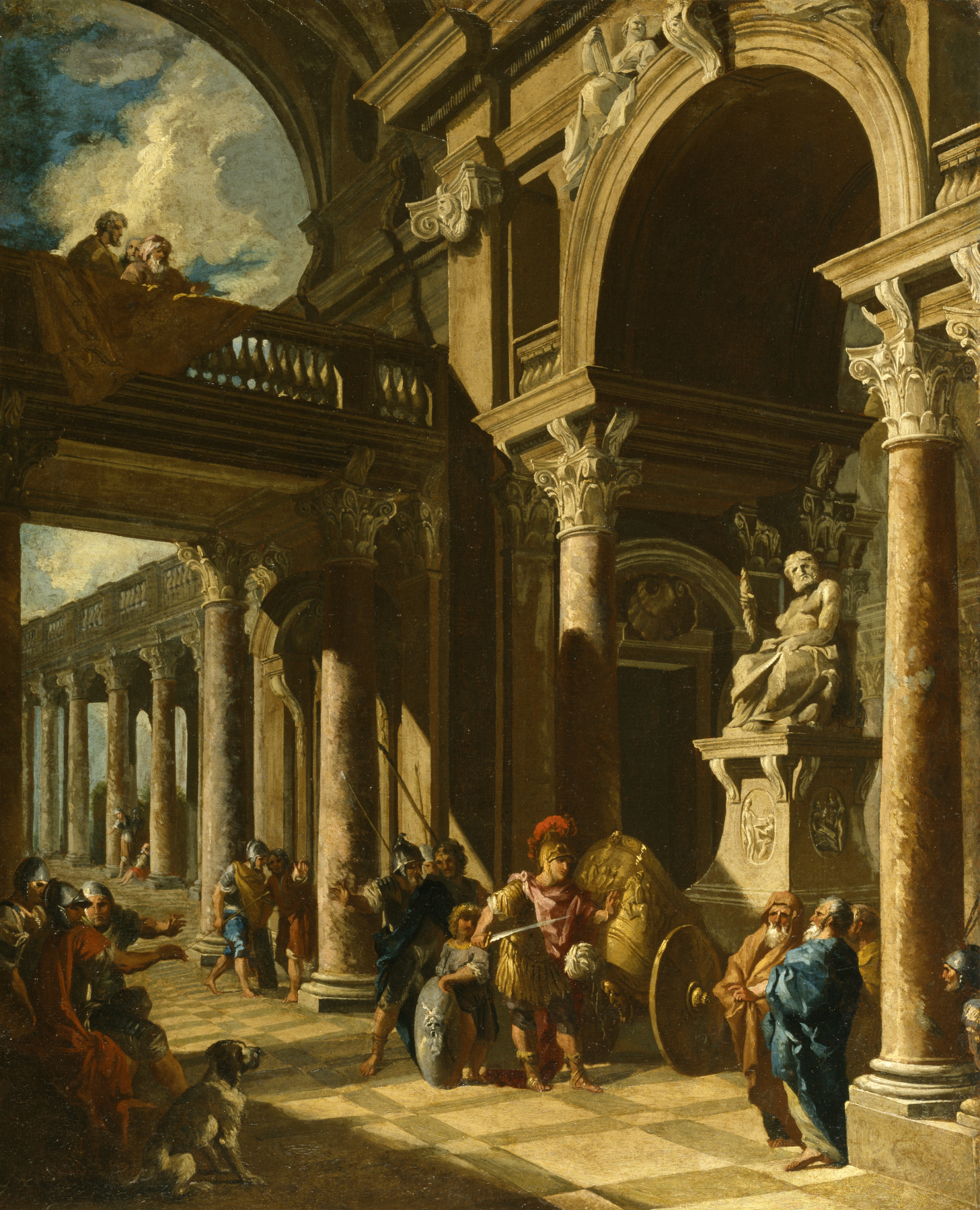
Giovanni Paolo Panini: Alexander the Great Cutting the Gordian Knot, oil on canvas, 733×597 mm, c. 1718‒1719 (Baltimore, Walters Art Museum)

Following in the footsteps of Caspar van Wittel, Giovanni Ghisolfi and Salvator Rosa, Panini devoted himself to the painting of vedute and capriccios. Noteworthy among his capriccios are the Architectural Capriccio (Toronto, Art Gallery of Ontario), and Alexander Cutting the Gordian Knot (Baltimore, MD, Walters Art Museum). In these works the compositions are vertical, animated by crowds of figures and lit by a brilliant light. Perhaps the most famous of Panini's capriccios is the Roman Capriccio: The Pantheon and Other Monuments (1735; he Indianapolis Museum of Art), which features a staggering array of Roman monuments, including the Temple of Hadrian, the Pantheon, the Temple of Vesta, the Maison Carrée and the Theatre of Marcellus. While quite cavalier with regard to geography, Panini was remarkably faithful in his architectural reconstructions. He carefully edited out later additions to the original buildings, such as the walled-in sections in the arches of the Theatre of Marcellus and Bernini's bell towers on the Pantheon's pediment.

Besides his capriccios, Panini also painted realistic topographical views of Rome. Heavily in demand among contemporary tourists, they include views of the ruined monuments of ancient Rome, such as the Colosseum, the Arch of Constantine and Other Monuments (1735; Gemäldegalerie, Berlin) or the signed and dated View of the Forum (1735; Detroit Institute of Arts). There are also views of contemporary Rome, such as the Basilica of Santa Maria Maggiore (signed and dated 1742 ) or the Piazza del Quirinale (signed and dated 1733 but executed in 1742; both Rome, Quirinal Palace), works teeming with crowds of vivacious little figures.

Another type of veduta shows the interiors of buildings, antique and modern, such as the Interior of St. Peter's Basilica, which exists in numerous versions, including one signed and dated 1731 (Saint Louis Art Museum), or the rare view of the Interior of San Giovanni in Laterano (Moscow, Pushkin Museum). Some vedute represent public ceremonies or the visit of some important figure to the city, as in the View with Firework Machine to Celebrate the Birth of the Infanta of Spain, signed and dated 23 October 1727 (London, Victoria and Albert Museum) or the two signed paintings commissioned by Cardinal Melchior de Polignac, French ambassador to the Holy See: the Preparation of the Decorations and Fireworks in Piazza Navona for the Celebration of the Birth of the Dauphin (1729) and Cardinal Melchior de Polignac Visiting St. Peter’s ( 1730; both Paris, Louvre). The former painting depicts the decorative wood and papier-mâché arches and the preparations being made for the firework display held on 30 November 1729 to celebrate the birth of Louis XV’s son, Louis Ferdinand. The monumental scene is crowded with figures and is rendered highly theatrical by its luminous composition centred around the imposing façade of Sant'Agnese in Agone, flanked by an imaginary view of Cardinal de Polignac’s palazzo. In the 1740s Panini recorded the visit to Rome of the Bourbon monarch, Charles III of Spain, with two paintings: the Visit of Charles III to St. Peter's Basilica (1745) and Charles of Bourbon Visiting Pope Benedict XIV at the Coffee House del Quirinale (1746; both Naples, Museo di Capodimonte). Dating to 1747 is the large canvas Musical Feast Given by the Cardinal de La Rochefoucauld for the Marriage of the Dauphin, which depicts the musical feast held at the Teatro Argentina in Rome by the Cardinal de La Rochefoucauld in honour of the marriage of the Dauphin Louis to Maria Josepha of Saxony (Paris, Louvre).

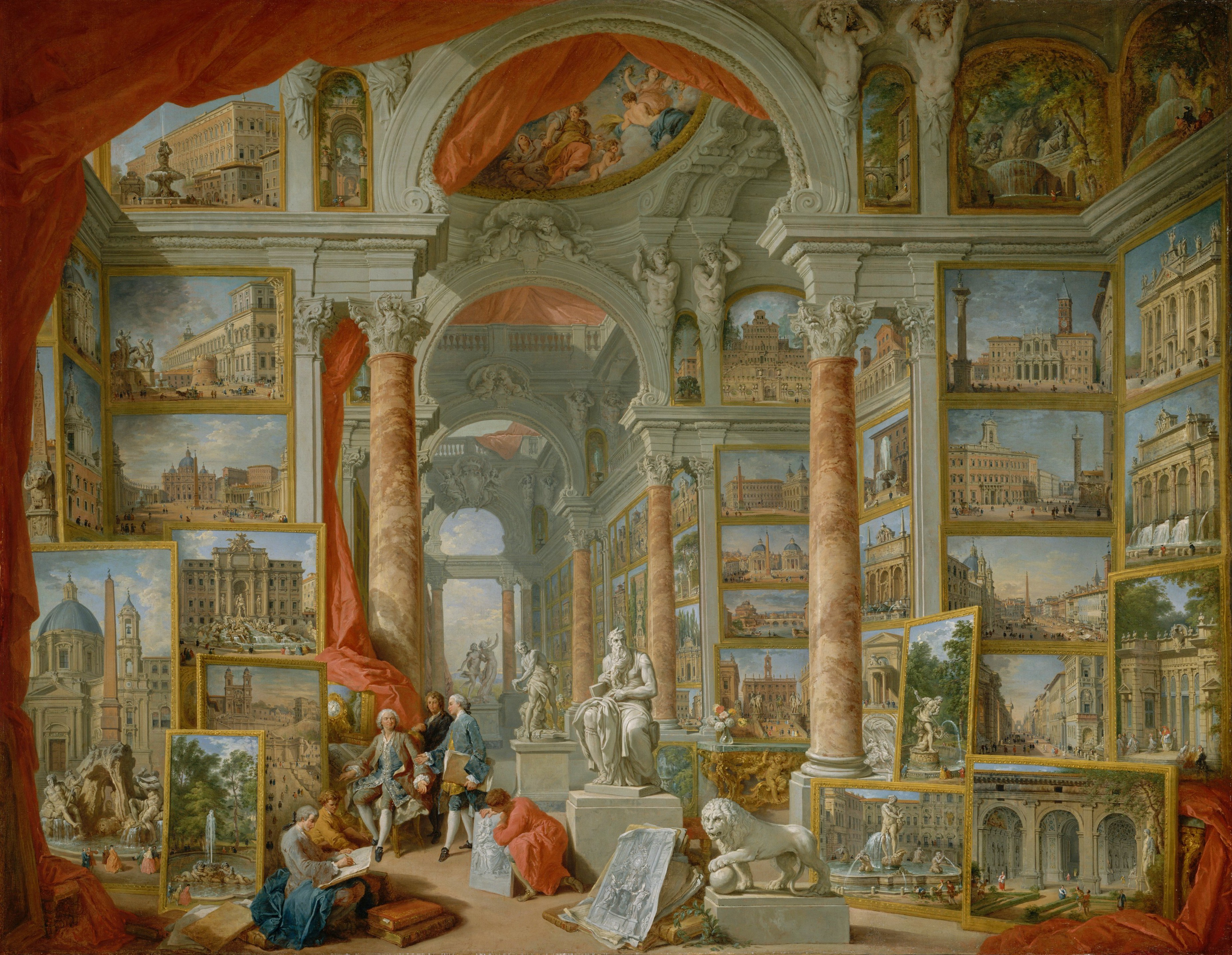
Giovanni Paolo Panini: Modern Rome, oil on canvas, 67 3/4 x 91 3/4 in. (172.1 x 233 cm), 1757 (New York, Metropolitan Museum of Art)

Among Panini's most appreciated works are his pictures of vast imaginary galleries, the walls of which are entirely stacked with vedute depicting the most famous Roman buildings, statues and reliefs (e.g. Modern Rome, 1757; New York, Metropolitan Museum of Art). Such compositions provided European tourists with a handy souvenir of all the most characteristic sights of Rome. The Gallery of Views of Ancient Rome (1758) and the Gallery of Views of Modern Rome (1759; both Paris, Louvre) were commissioned by Claude-François de Montboissier de Canillac de Beaufort, chargé d'affaires of the embassy of France to the Holy See. Panini died in Rome on 21 October 1765 and was buried in the small church of San Giovanni in Ayno in the rione Regola.

Panini is also documented as an architect. In 1732, he served as one of the judges on the architectural panel for the competition to design the new façade of San Giovanni in Laterano. In 1734 he designed the chapel of Santa Teresa (inaugurated 1745) in Santa Maria della Scala in Rome. He also provided drawings of designs for carvings and ecclesiastical furnishings, such as those for the tabernacle of the church of San Romualdo in Ravenna. Panini also created firework machines and ephemeral architectural sets for various celebrations for the Cardinal-Protectors of France and Spain.

== Legacy ==
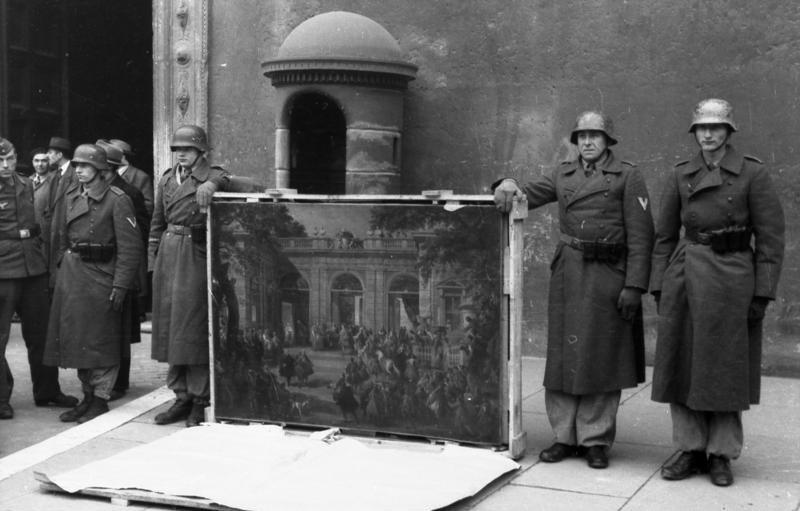
German soldiers in 1944 posing with a Pannini picture – Charles of Bourbon Visiting Pope Benedict XIV at the Coffee House del Quirinale – at the time looted from the Museo di Capodimonte in Naples

Panini’s studio was a major artistic hub that trained and influenced both Italian and foreign artists. His style had a significant impact on leading Italian vedutisti such as Canaletto and Bernardo Bellotto. Panini also had a profound influence on French Neoclassical painters such as Charles-Louis Clérisseau, Claude-Joseph Vernet, Jean-Honoré Fragonard, and Hubert Robert, who travelled to Rome to further their artistic education. Robert, in particular, was a pupil of Panini's and his early works were often mistaken for those of his master.

In addition to being a painter and architect, Panini was a professor of perspective and optics at the French Academy of Rome. His masterful use of perspective was later the inspiration for the creation of the "Panini Projection", a mathematical rule for constructing images with very wide fields of view, which is now used in software for creating and viewing panoramic photographs.

Panini was one of the most successful Roman painters of his time. His work was in high demand from private clients, particularly British noblemen, as well as royal courts. The Spanish monarchs commissioned Filippo Juvarra to purchase his paintings to adorn the Lacquer Room at the Royal Palace of La Granja de San Ildefonso. Panini's works are held in the permanent collections of many museums worldwide, including the Prado Museum, the Louvre, the Museo Nazionale di Capodimonte, the Museo Thyssen-Bornemisza, the Hermitage, the Pushkin Museum, the Staatsgalerie Stuttgart, the Staatliche Museen, the Palazzo del Quirinale, the Toledo Museum of Art, the University of Michigan Museum of Art, the Brooklyn Museum, the Saint Louis Art Museum, the Detroit Institute of Arts, the Museum of Fine Arts Boston, the Getty Center, the Metropolitan Museum of Art, the Nelson-Atkins Museum of Art, the Virginia Museum of Fine Arts, the Walters Art Museum, the Harvard Art Museums, the Philadelphia Museum of Art, and the Indianapolis Museum of Art.

== Gallery ==
=== History paintings ===
Expulsion of the Moneychangers from the Temple (c. 1724), oil on canvas, 74 x 99 cm., Thyssen-Bornemisza Museum

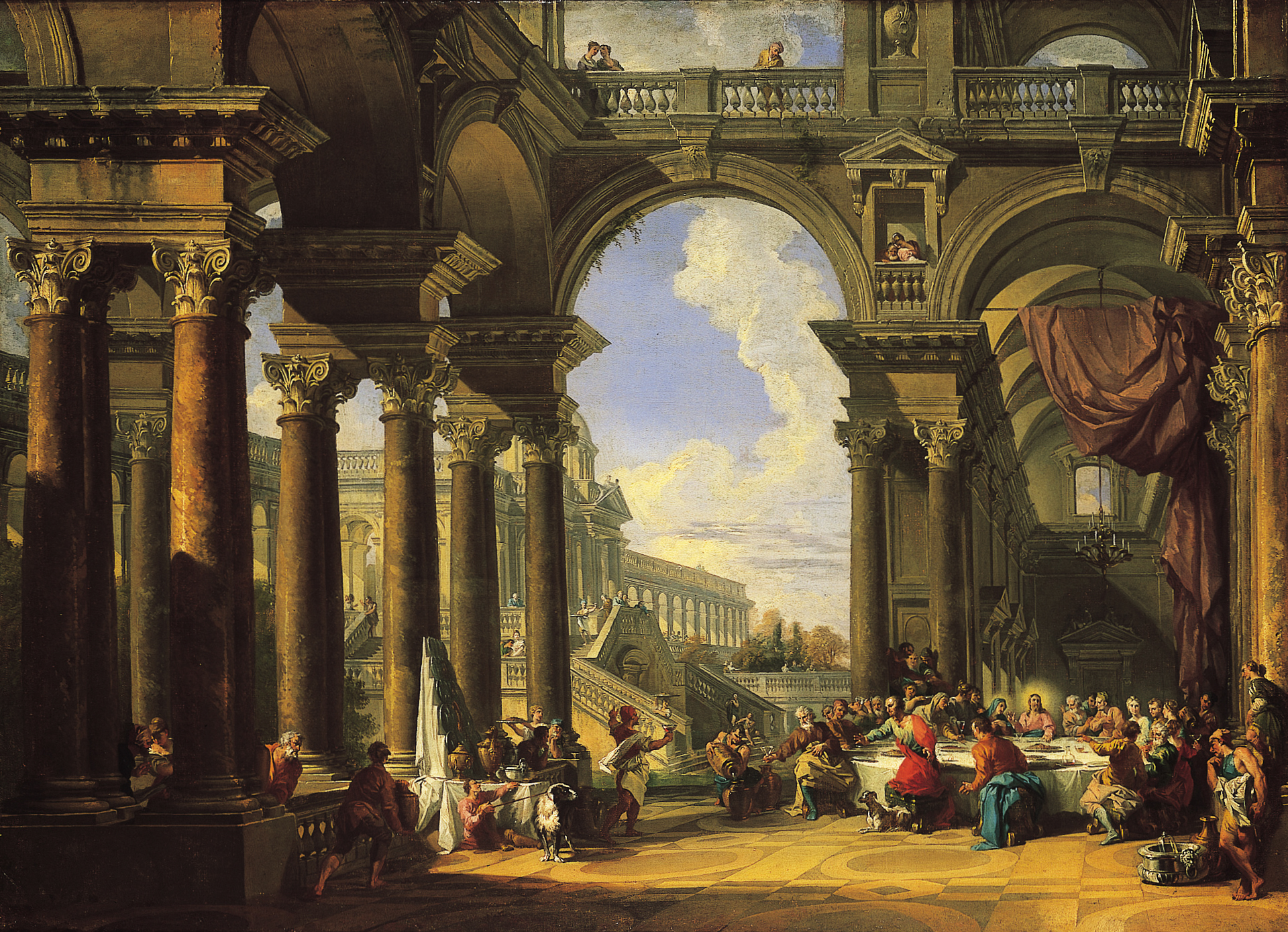
The Wedding at Cana (c. 1725), oil on canvas, 99.2 × 137.2 cm., Speed Art Museum

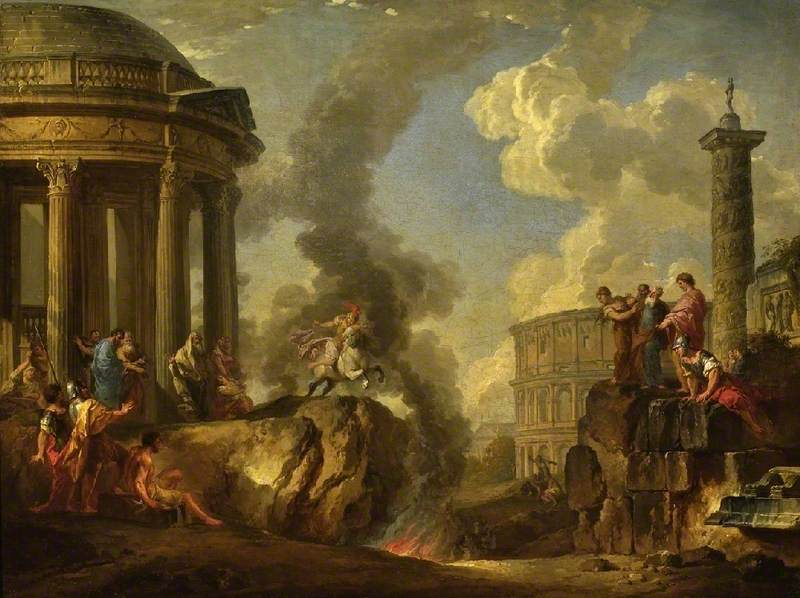
Marcus Curtius Leaping into the Gulf (no date), oil on canvas, 73.7 x 98.1 cm., Fitzwilliam Museum

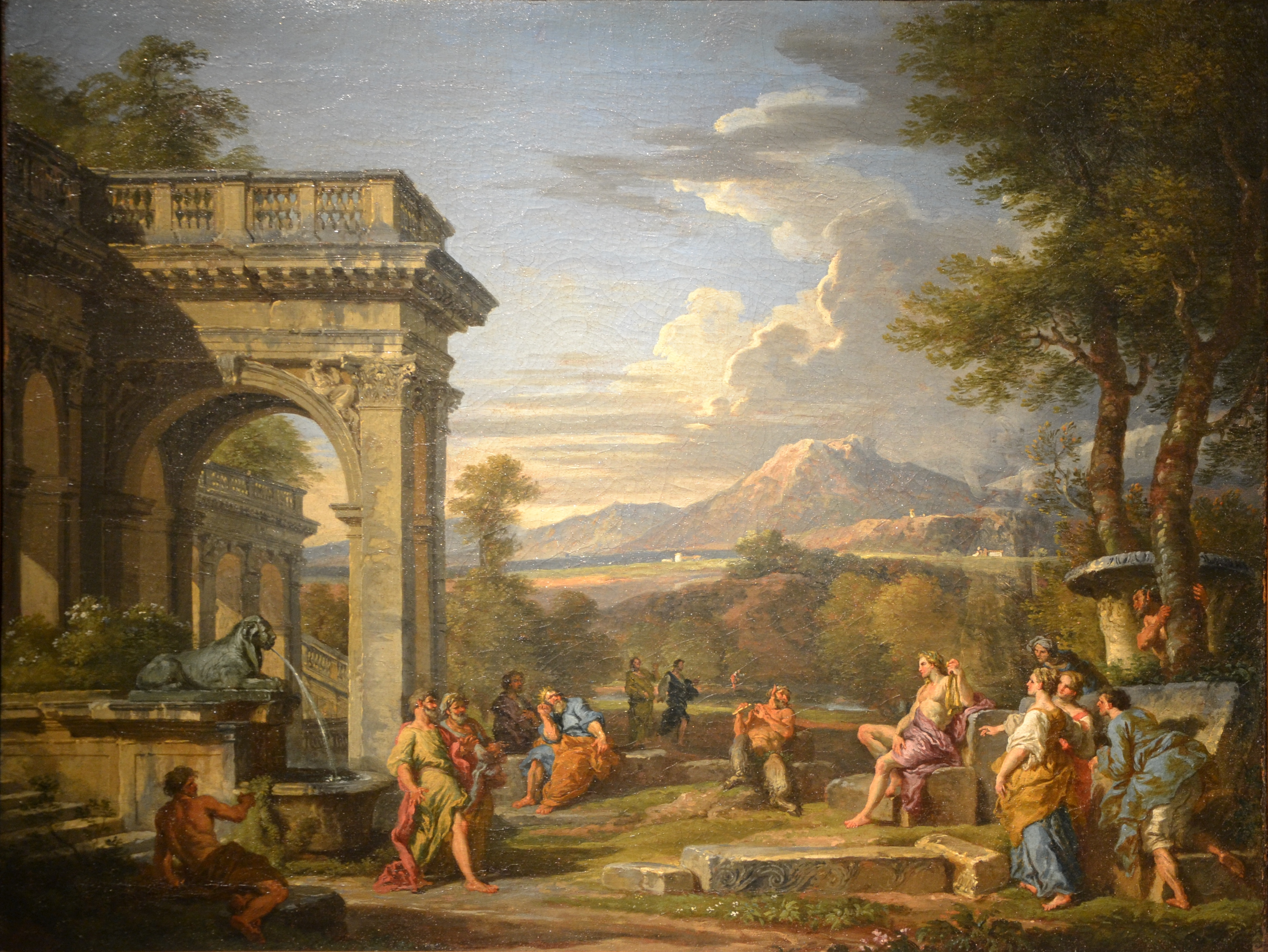
Apollo and Mars (no date), oil on canvas, Diocesan Museum of Milan

=== Capriccios ===
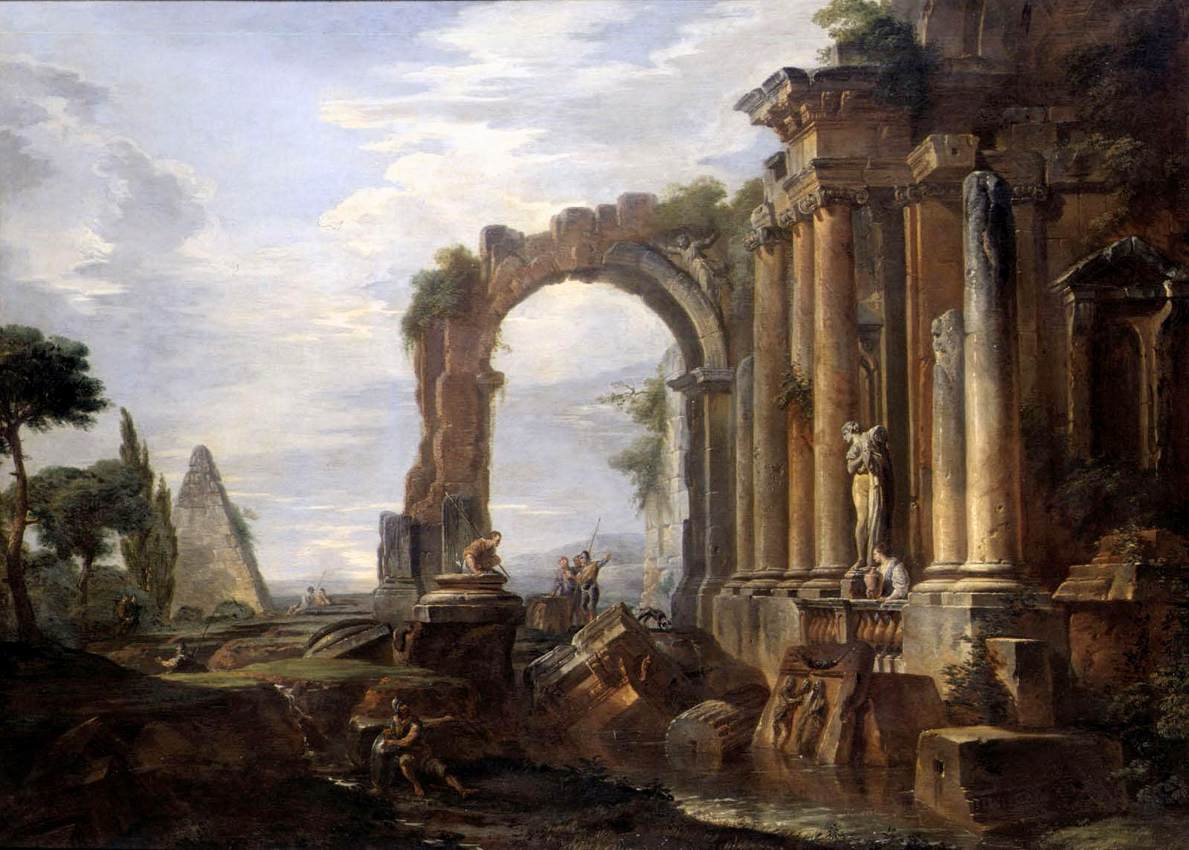
Capriccio of Classical Ruins (c. 1725-30), oil on canvas, 123 x 132 cm., private collection

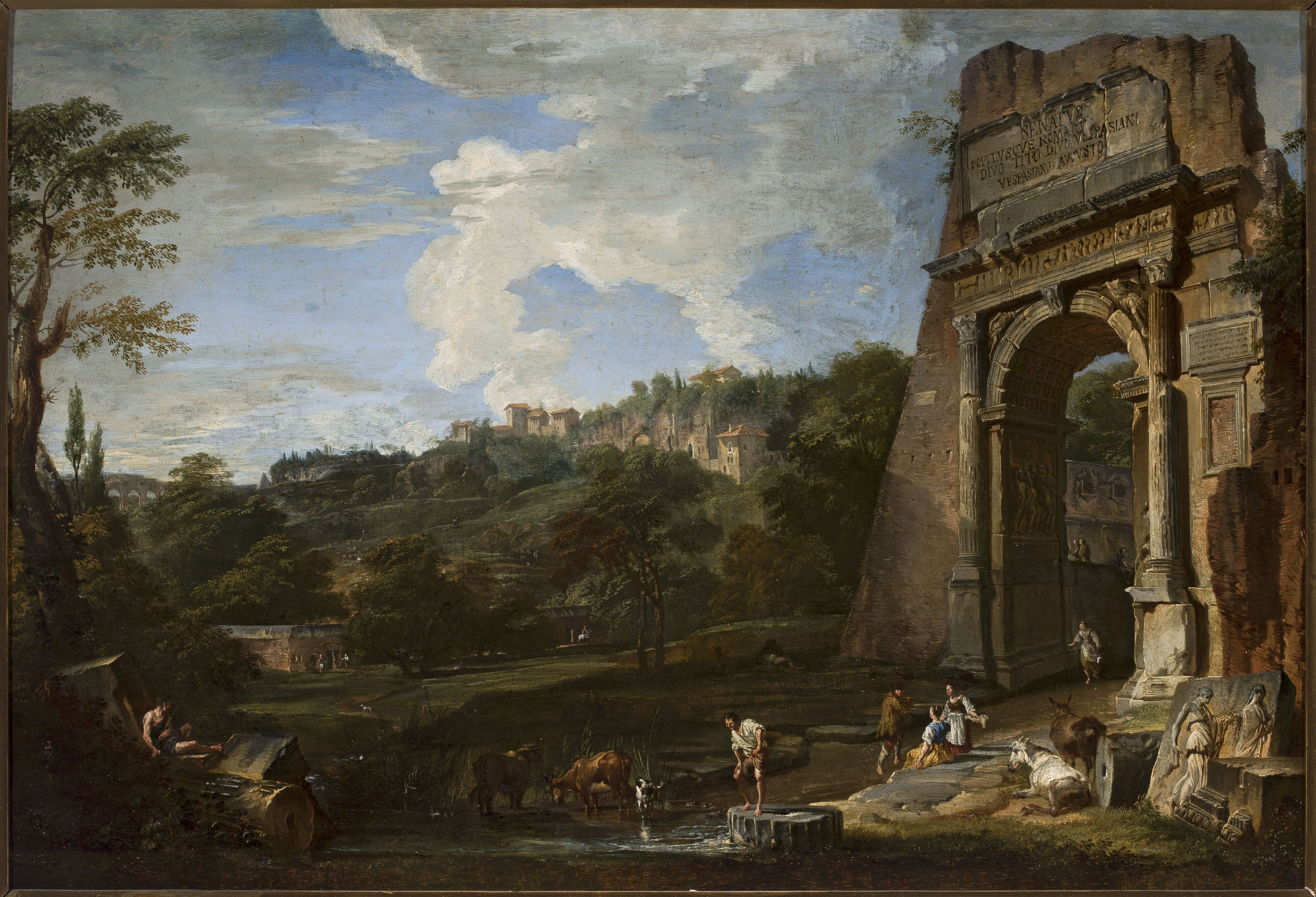
Landscape with the Arch of Titus (1725-50), oil on canvas, 51 x 76 cm., National Museum, Warsaw

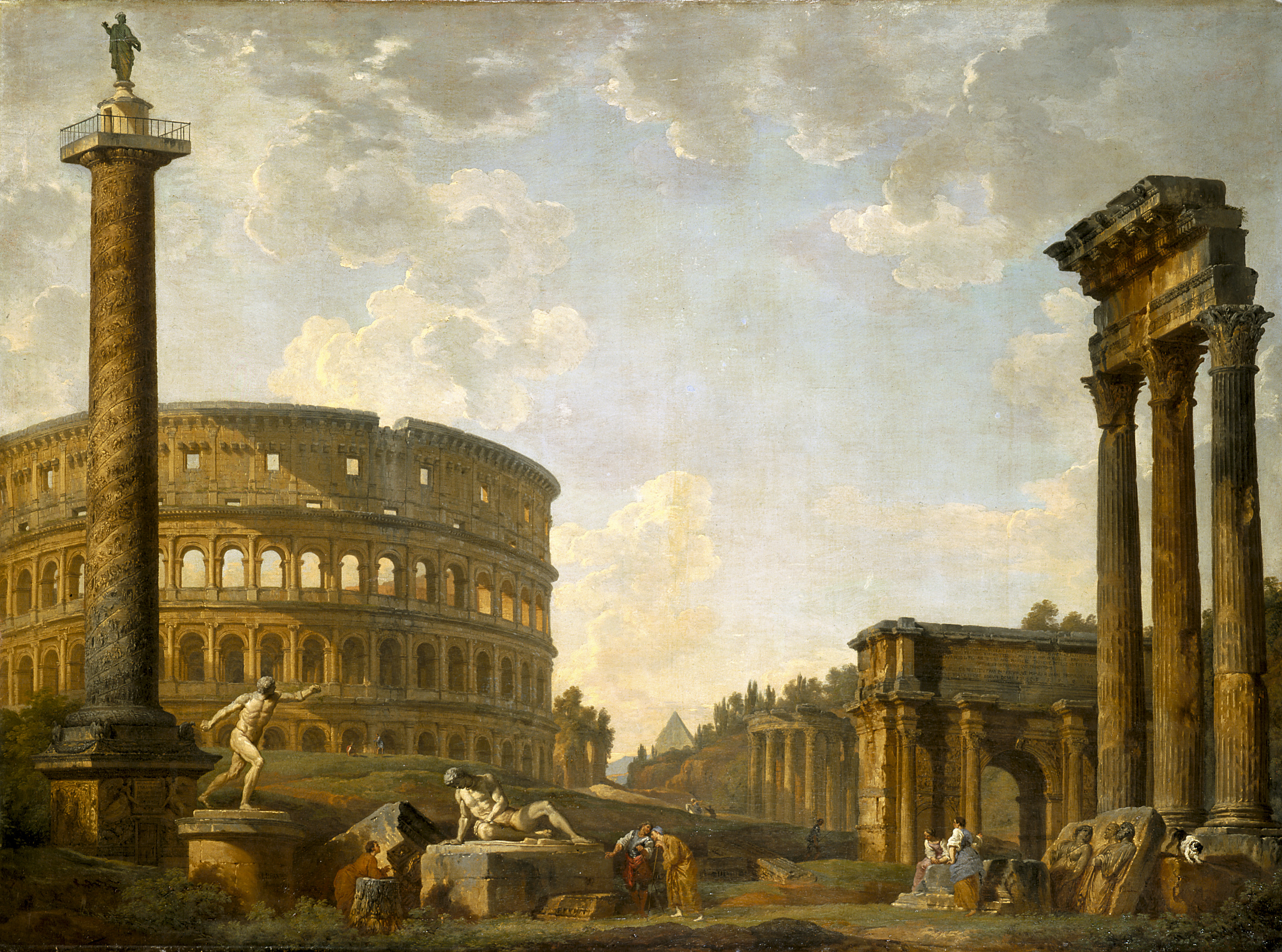
Roman Capriccio: The Colosseum and Other Monuments (1735), oil on canvas, 98.4 x 133 cm., Indianapolis Museum of Art

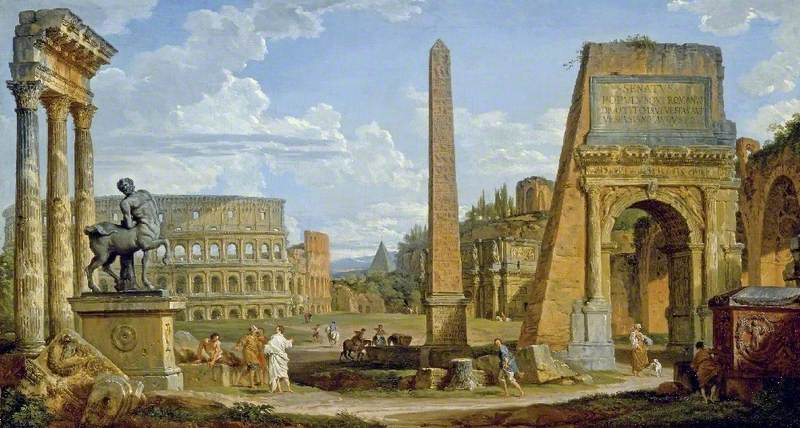
A Capriccio of Roman Ruins (1737), oil on canvas, 36.8 x 69.2 cm., Fitzwilliam Museum

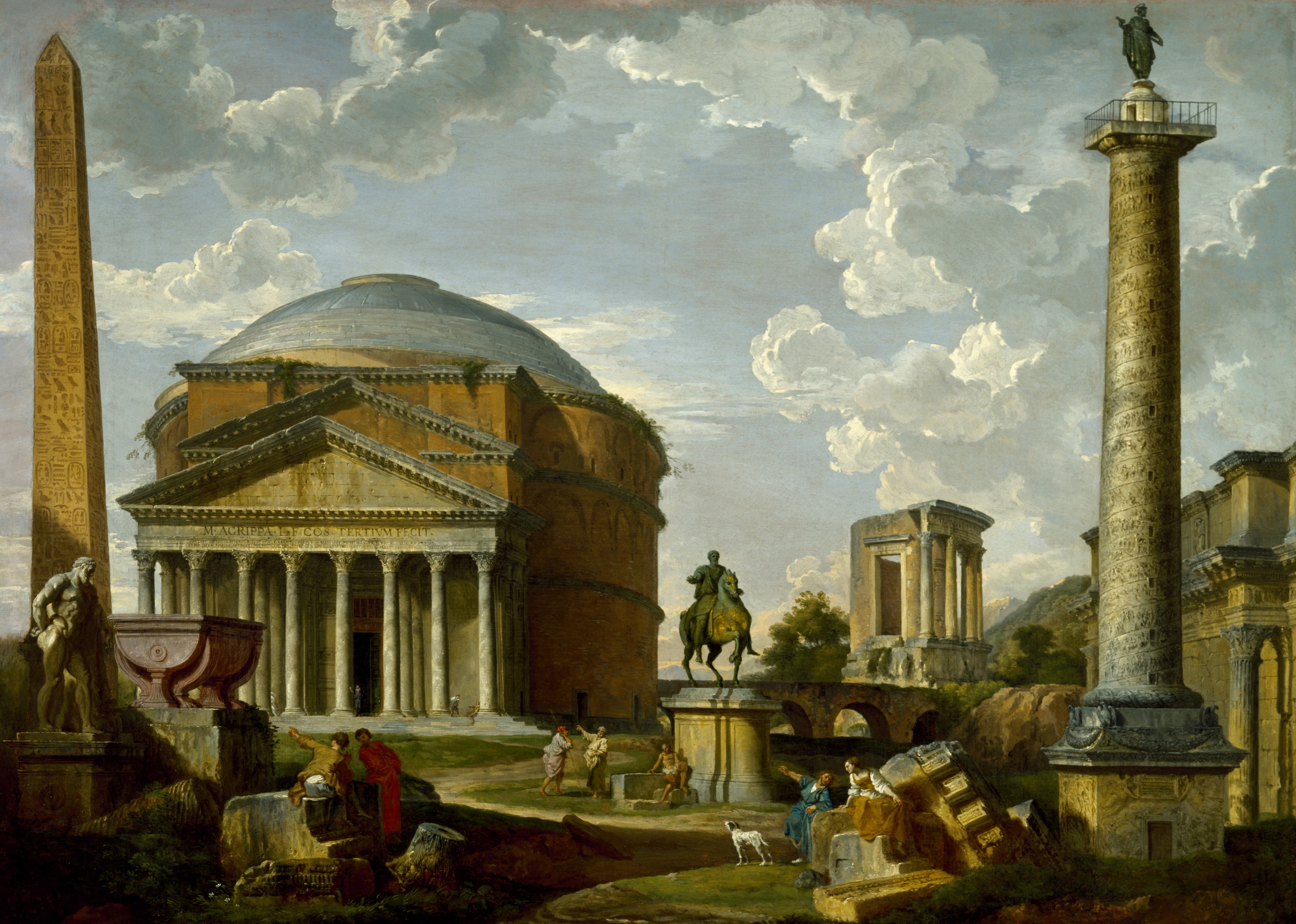
Fantasy View with the Pantheon and other Monuments of Ancient Rome (1737), oil on canvas, 99 x 137.5 cm., Museum of Fine Arts, Houston

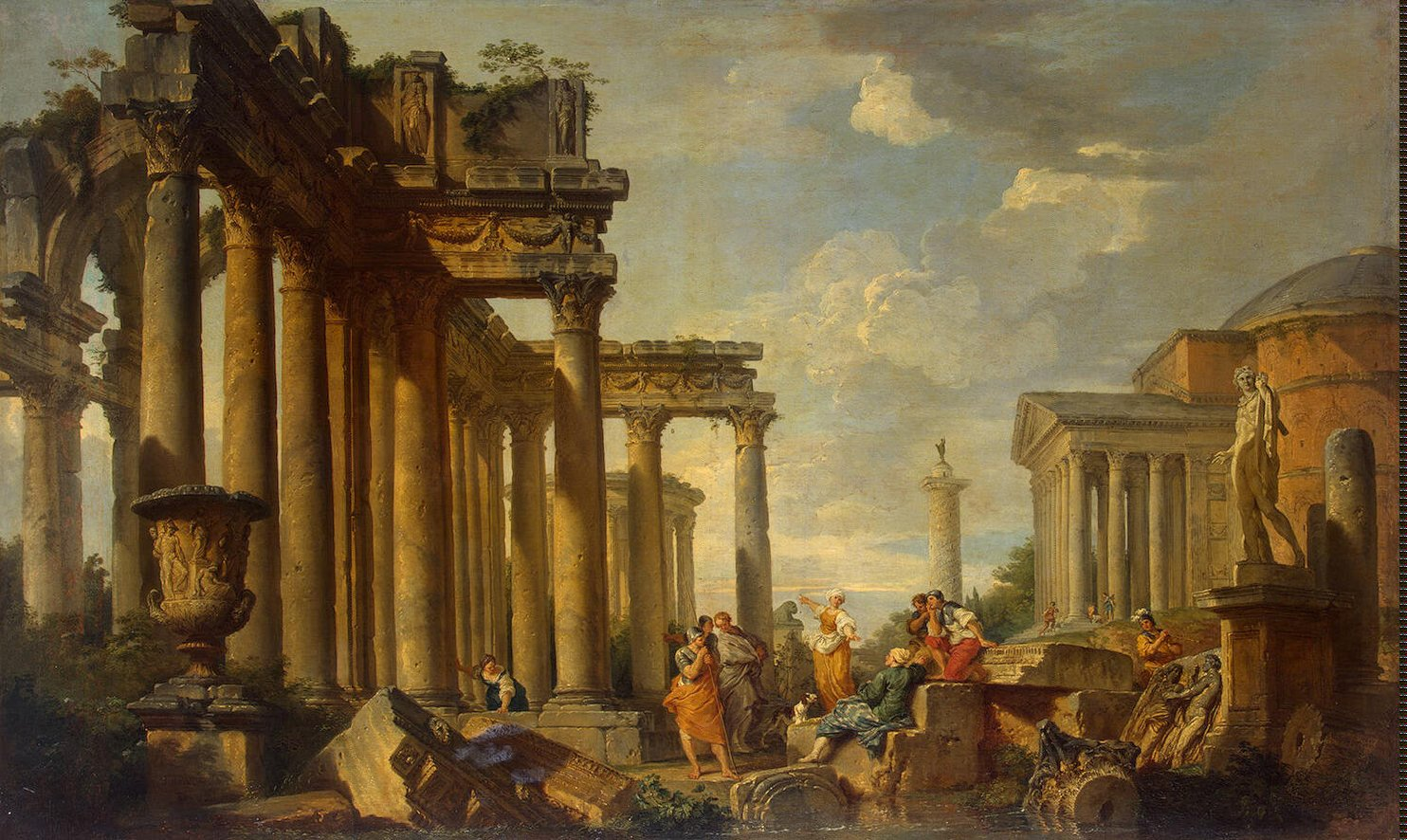
St Sibyl's Sermon in Roman Ruins with the Statue of Apollo (1740s), oil on canvas, 81 x 125 cm., Hermitage Museum

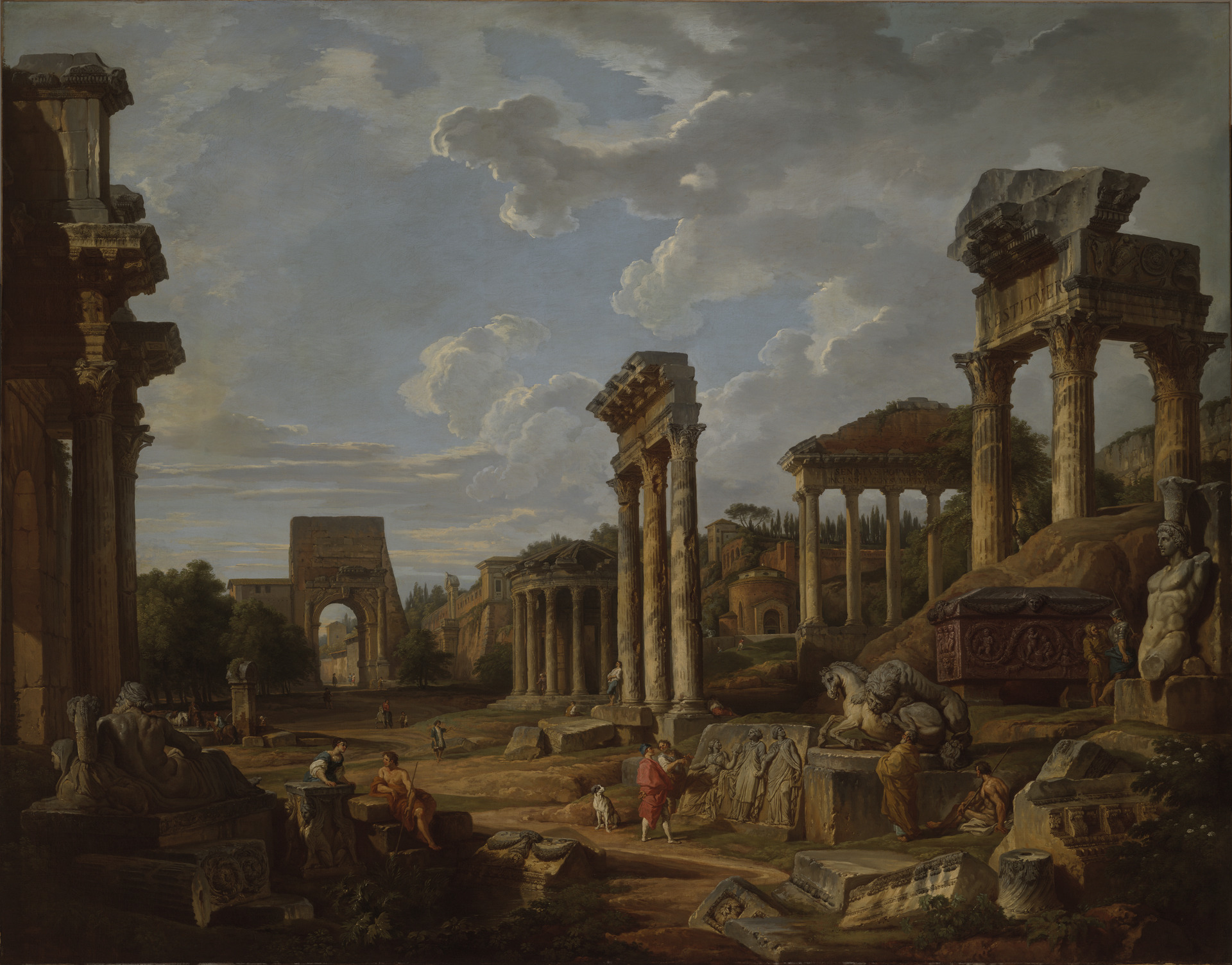
A Capriccio of the Roman Forum (1741), oil on canvas, 170.8 x 217.8 cm., Yale University Art Gallery

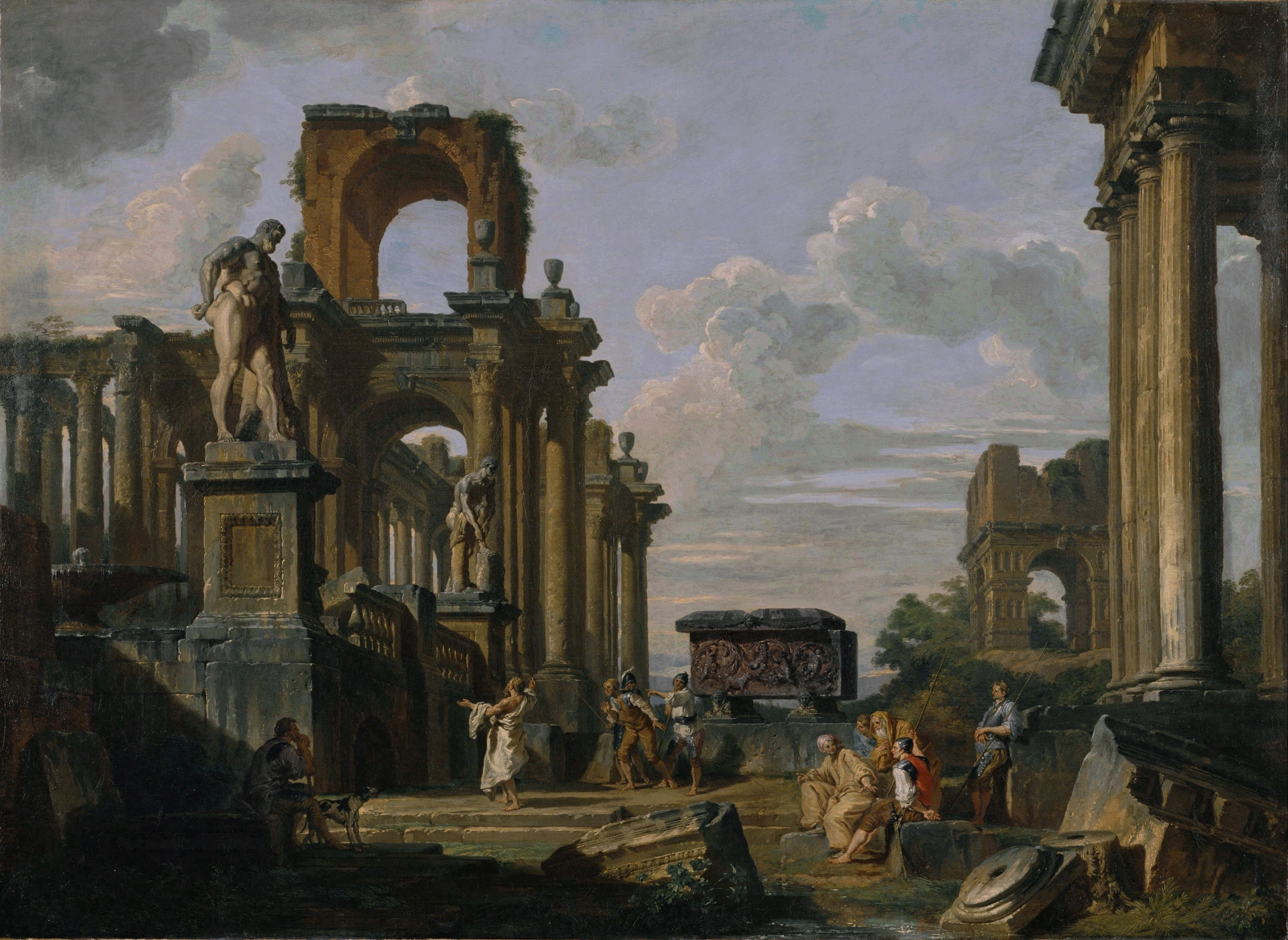
Architectural Capriccio of the Roman Forum with Philosophers and Soldiers (1745-50), oil on canvas, 98.4 x 135 cm., National Museum of Western Art

=== Veduta (contemporary Rome) ===
Preparation of the Decorations and Fireworks in Piazza Navona for the Celebration of the Birth of the Dauphin (1729), oil on canvas, 107 x 248 cm., Louvre

The Nave of St. Peter's Basilica in the Vatican (1735), oil on canvas, 154.5 x 197 cm., National Gallery of Art

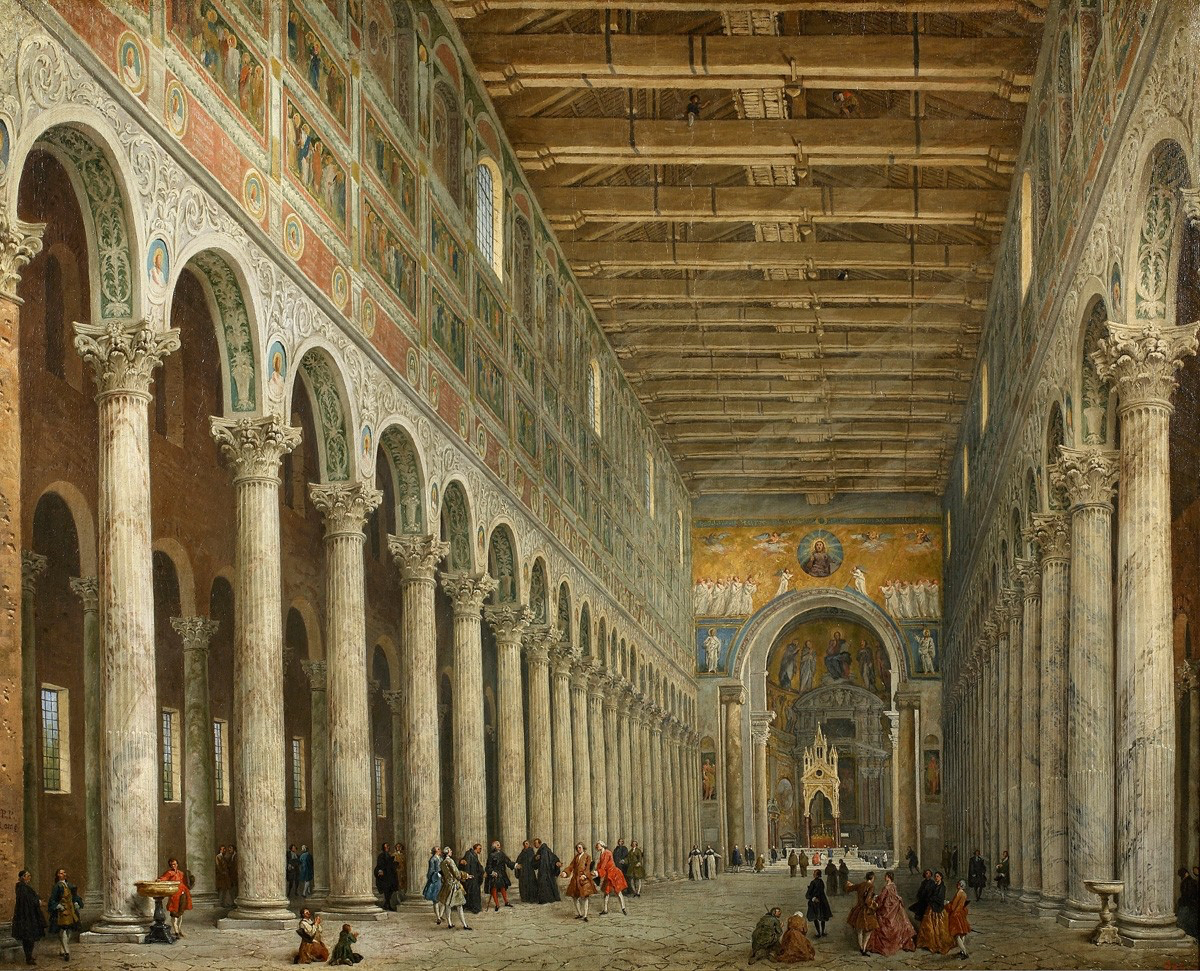
Interior of the Basilica of Saint Paul Outside the Walls in Rome (no date), oil on canvas, 74 × 98 cm., Pushkin State Museum of Fine Arts

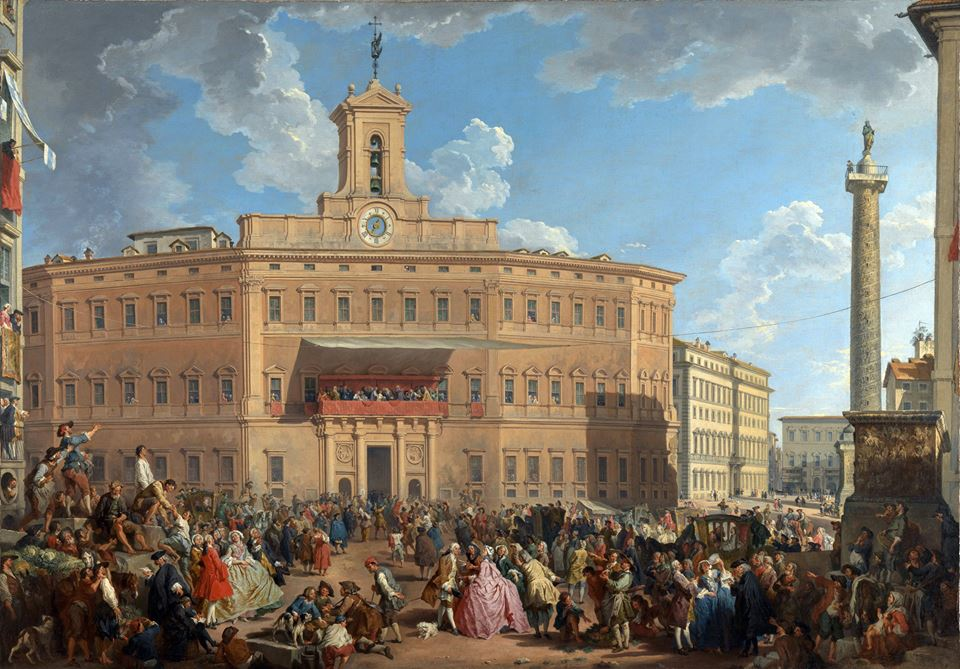
The Lottery in Piazza di Montecitorio (1743), oil on canvas, National Gallery

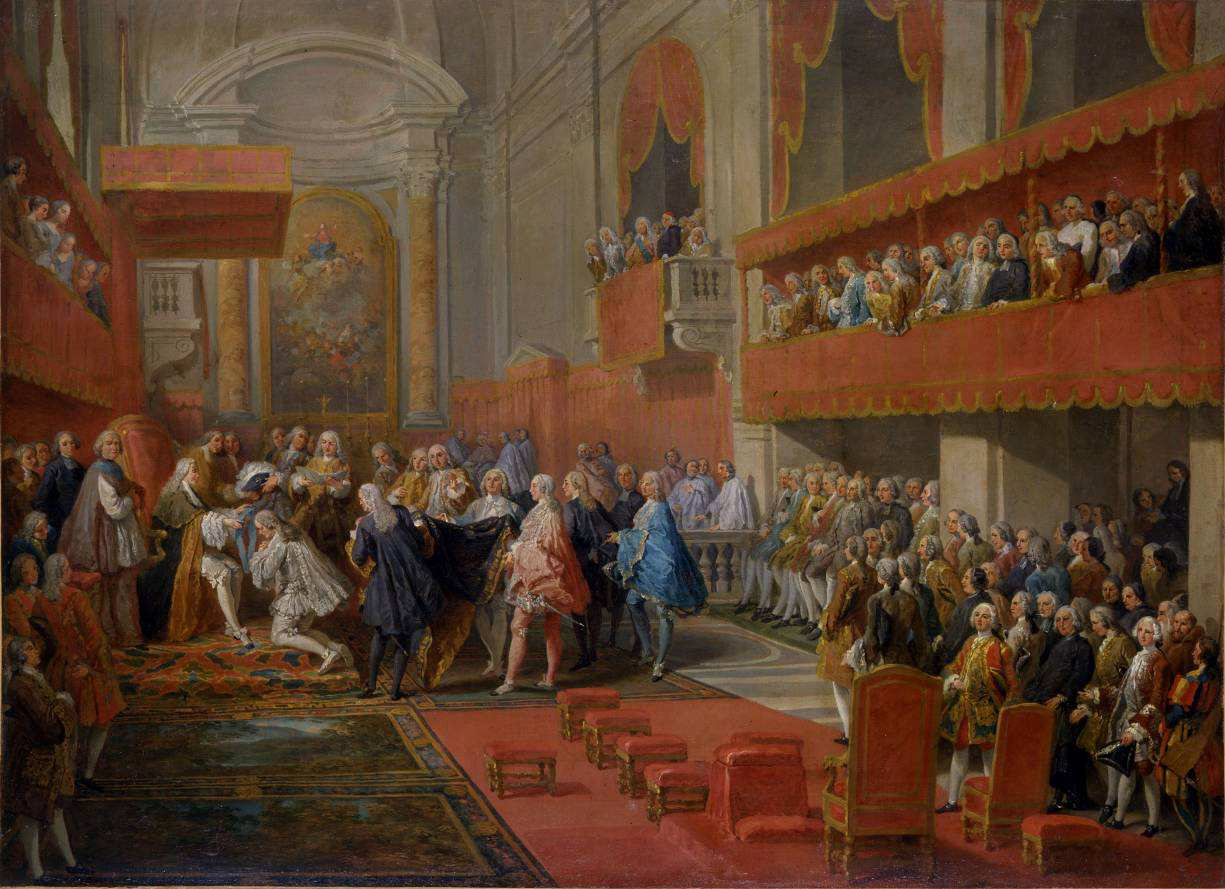
The delivery of the Order of the Holy Spirit to Prince Vaini by the Duke of Saint-Aignan in the Saint-Louis-des-Français church, September 15, 1737 (c. 1745), oil on canvas, 72 x 98 cm., Musée des Beaux-Arts de Caen

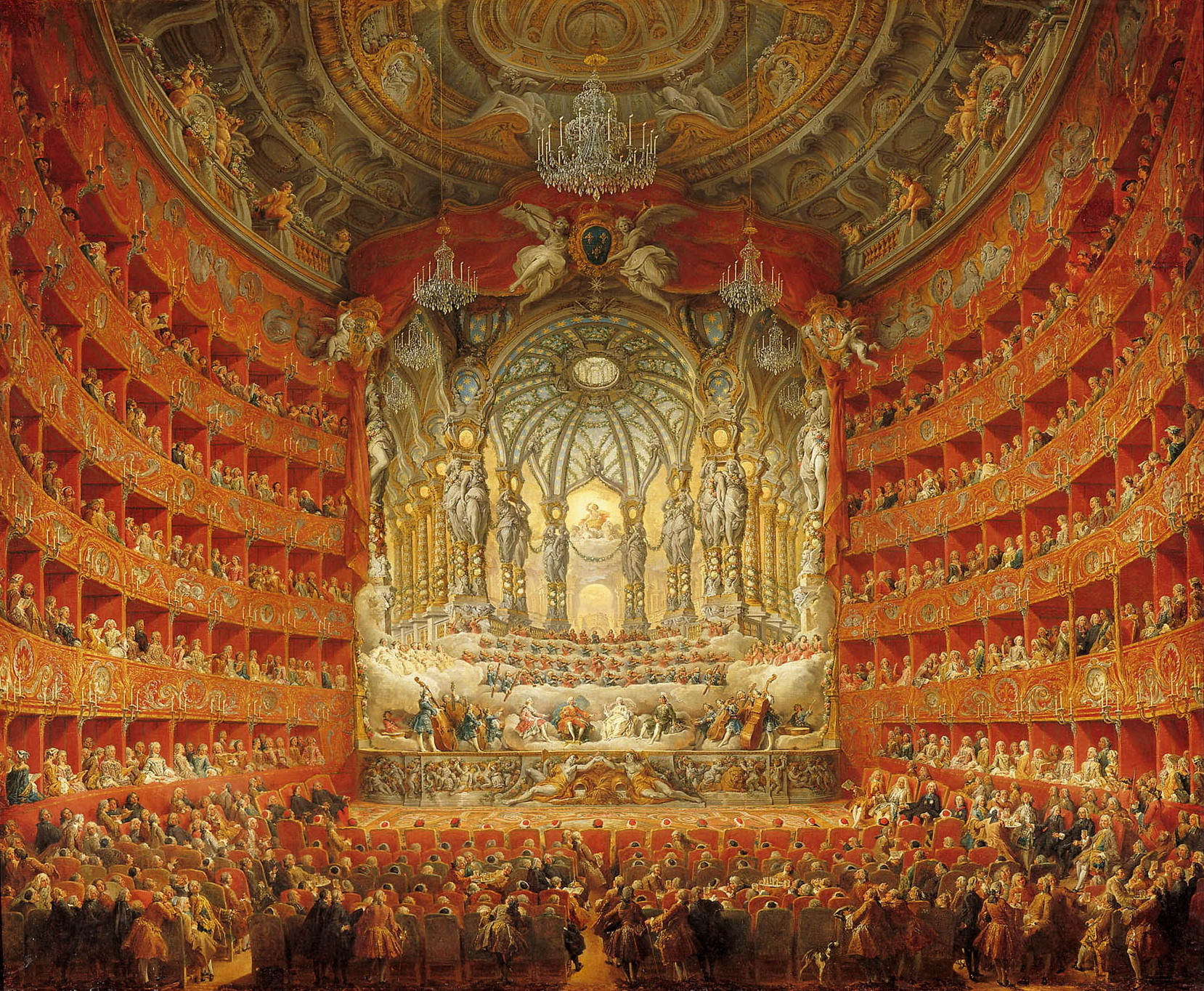
Musical feast given by the cardinal de La Rochefoucauld in the Teatro Argentina in Rome in 1747 on the occasion of the marriage of Dauphin, son of Louis XV (1747), oil on canvas, 207 x 247 cm., Louvre

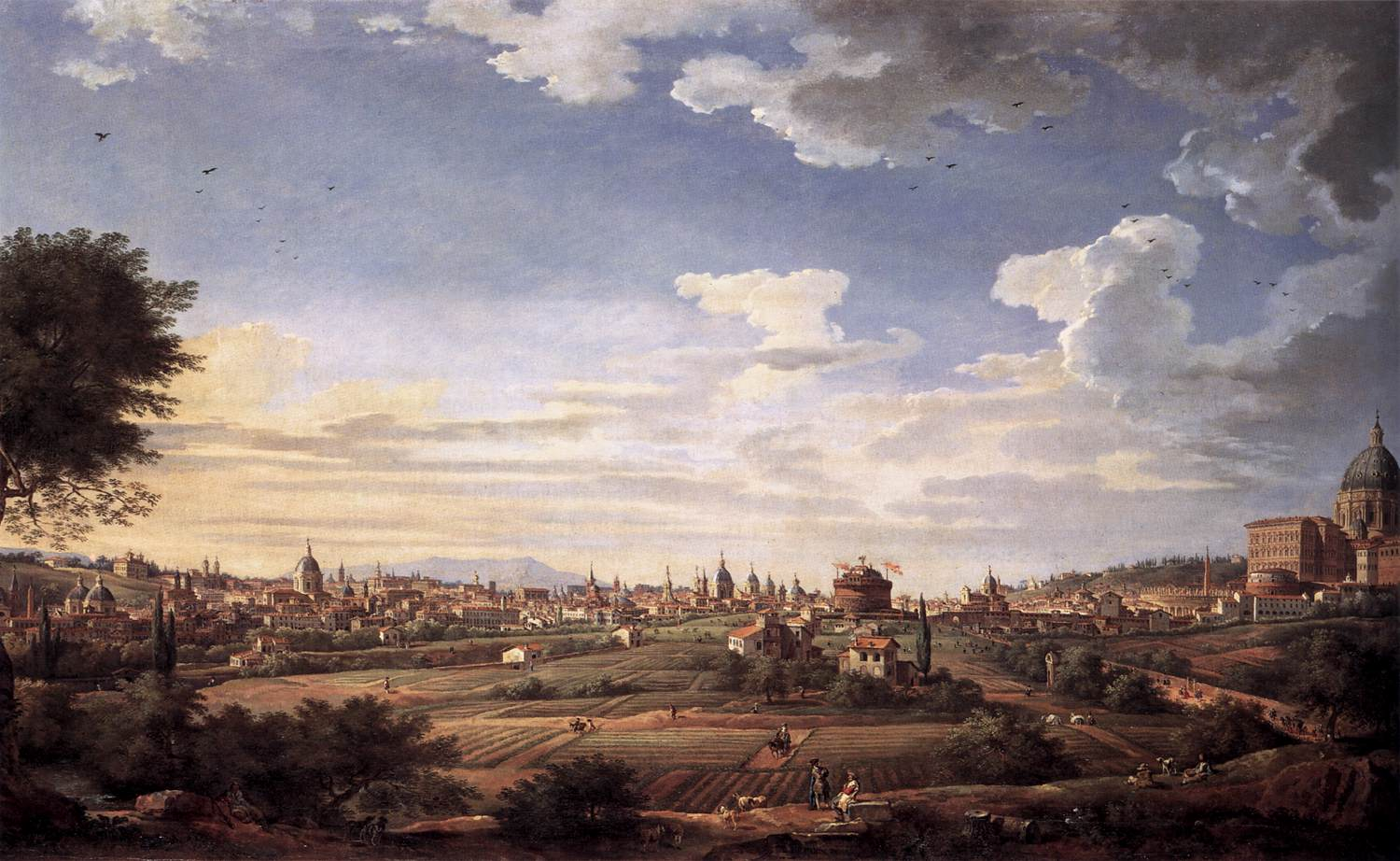
View of Rome from Mt. Mario, in the Southeast (1749), oil on canvas, 102 x 168 cm., Gemäldegalerie, Berlin

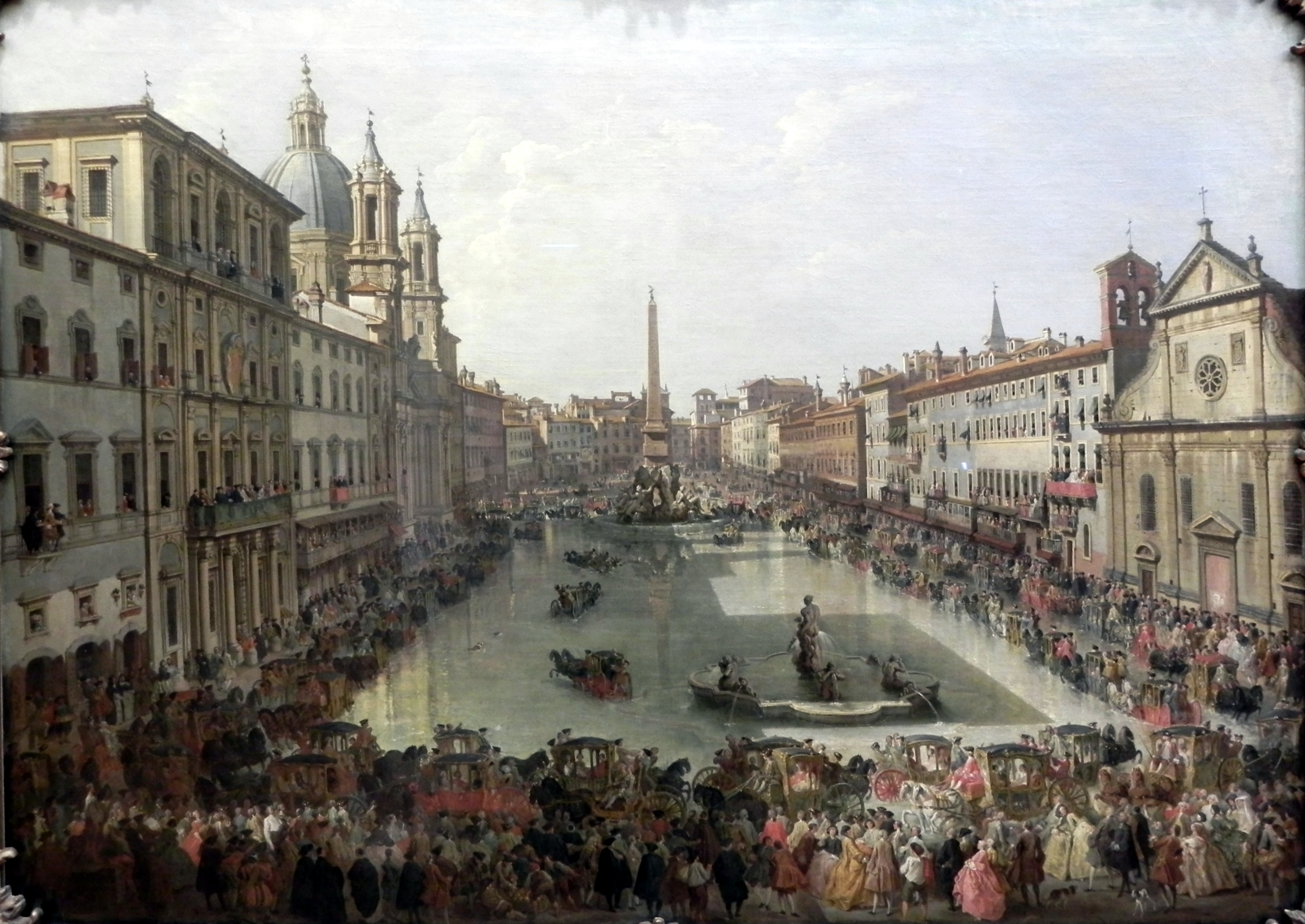
Piazza Navona, Rome (1756), oil on canvas, Landesmuseum Hannover

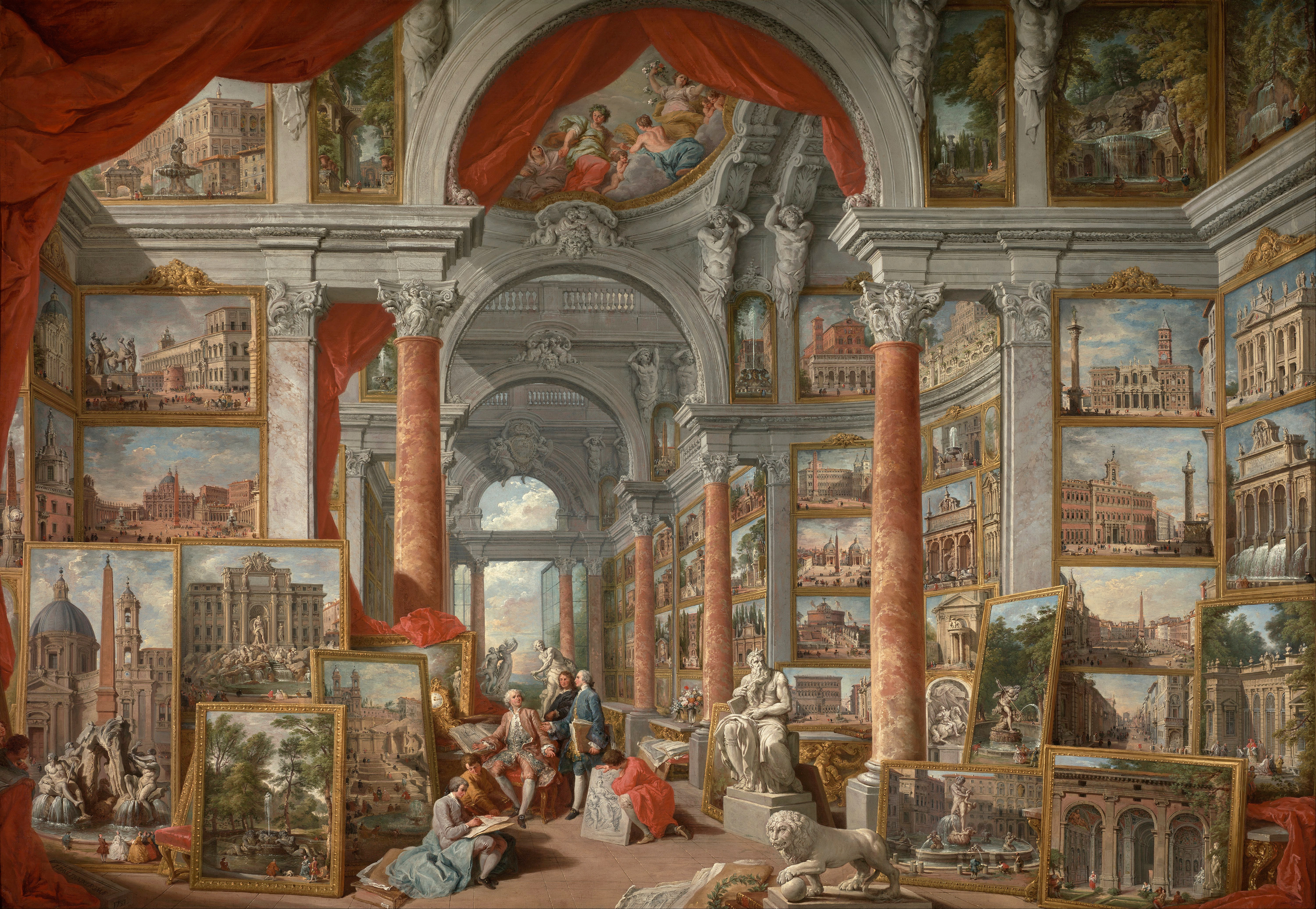
Picture Gallery with Views of Modern Rome (1757), oil on canvas, 170 x 245 cm., Museum of Fine Arts Boston

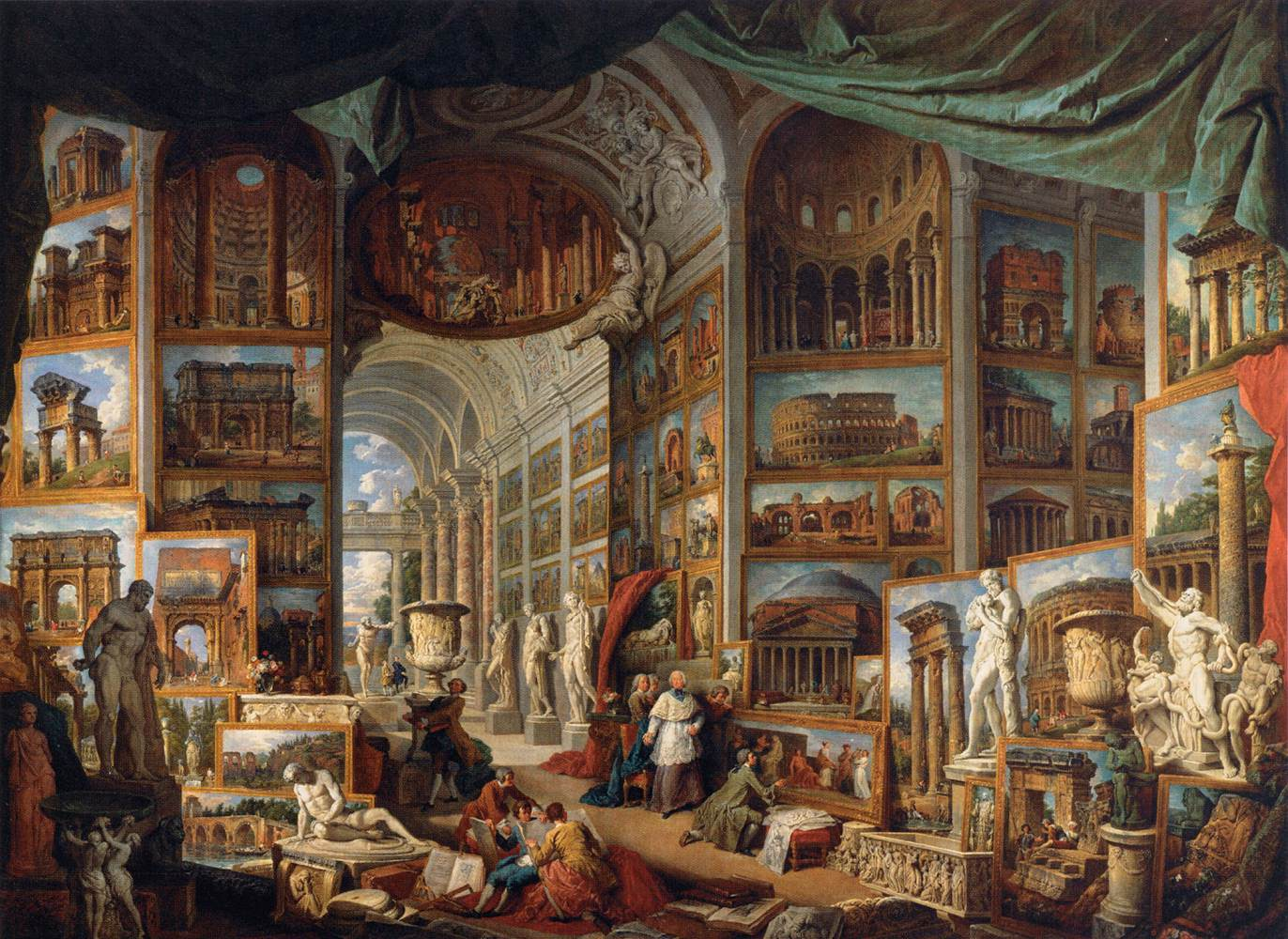
Gallery of Views of Ancient Rome (1758), oil on canvas, 203 x 300 cm., Louvre

=== Drawings ===
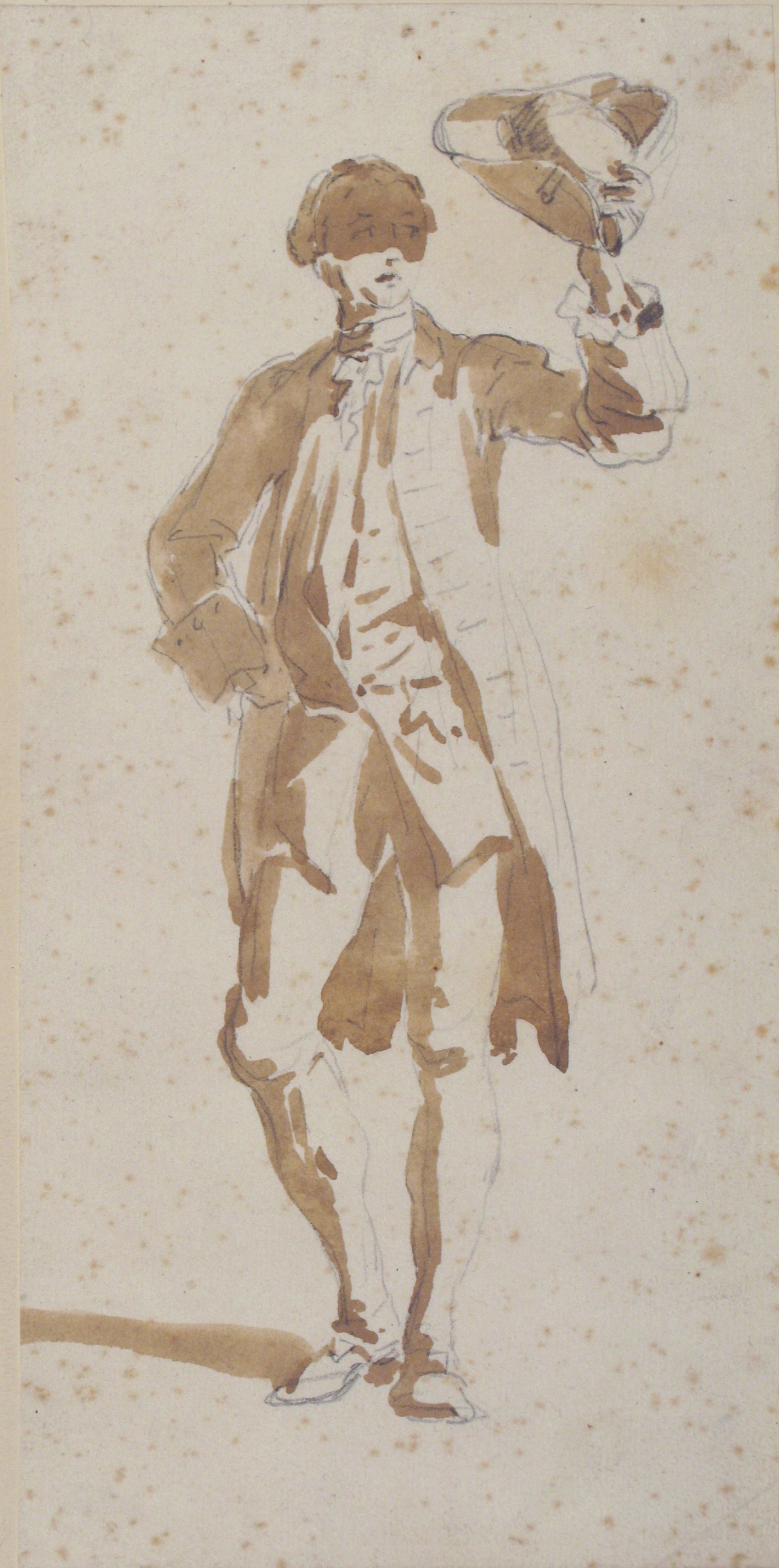
Man Shading His Face with a Tricorne (no date), brown wash, over graphite, 21.6 x 10.6 cm., Metropolitan Museum of Art

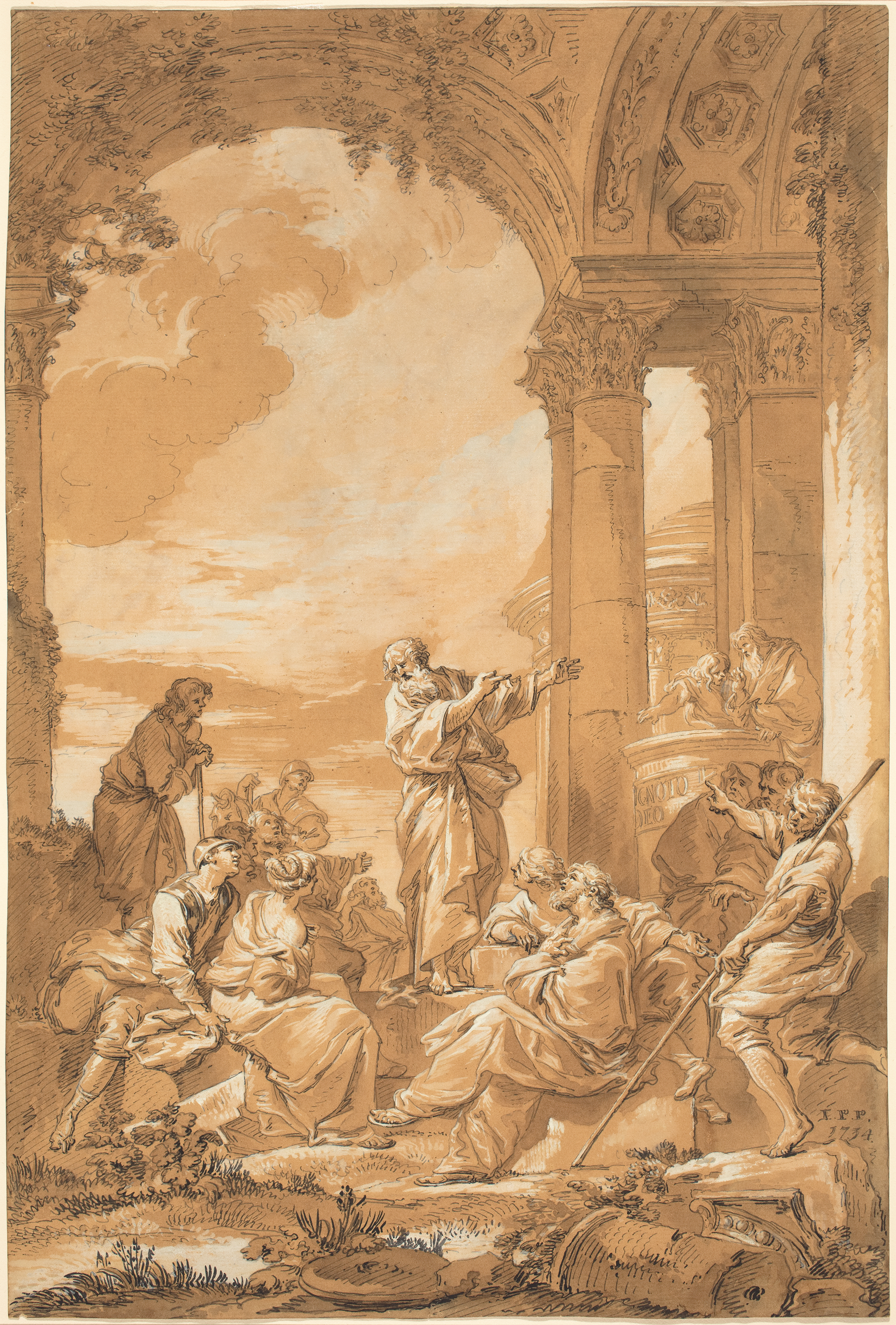
Saint Paul Preaching in Athens, 1734, National Gallery of Art

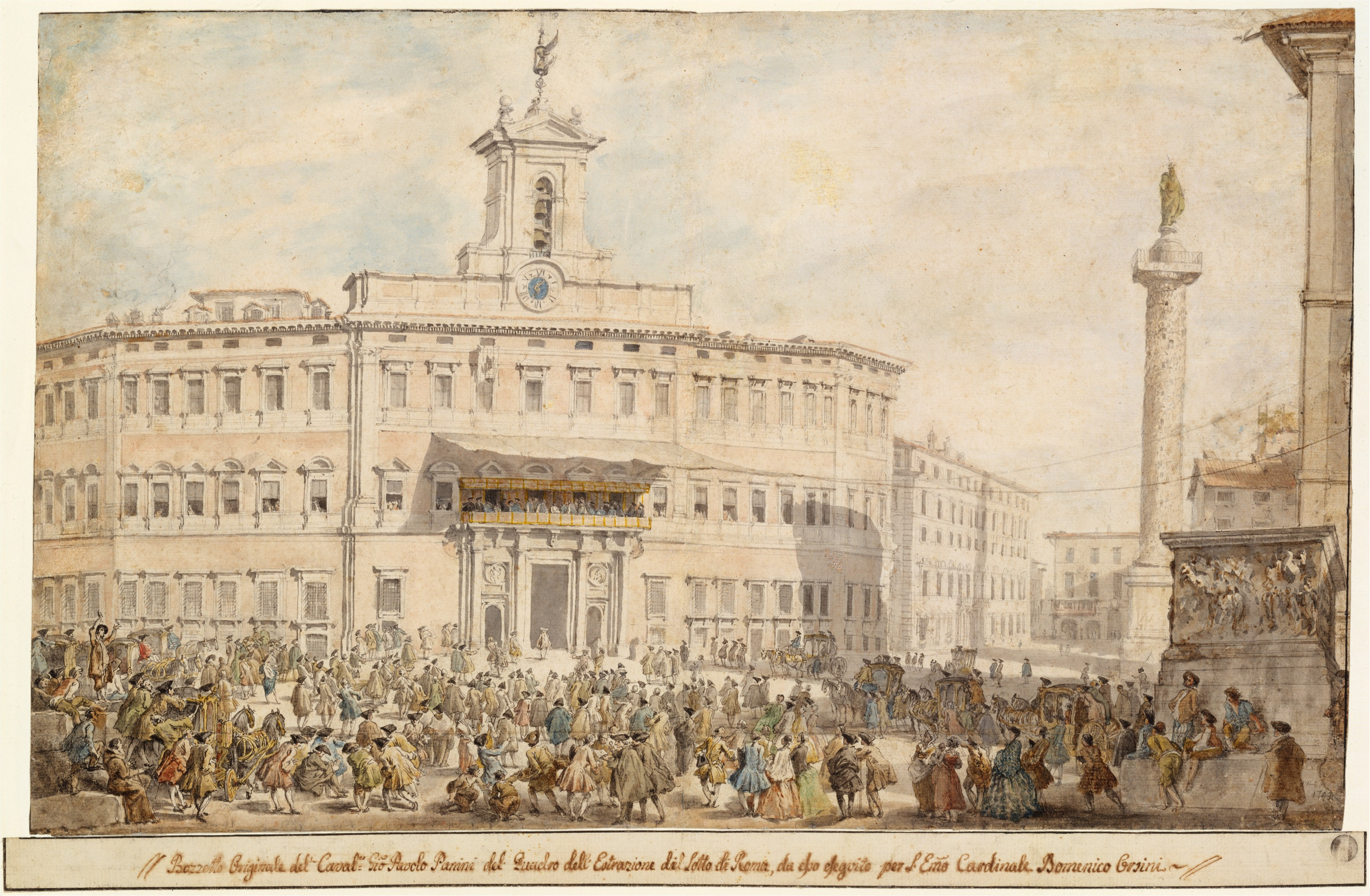
The Lottery in Piazza di Montecitorio (1743–44), Pen, ink, watercolor, graphite, 34 x 54.5 cm., Metropolitan Museum of Art

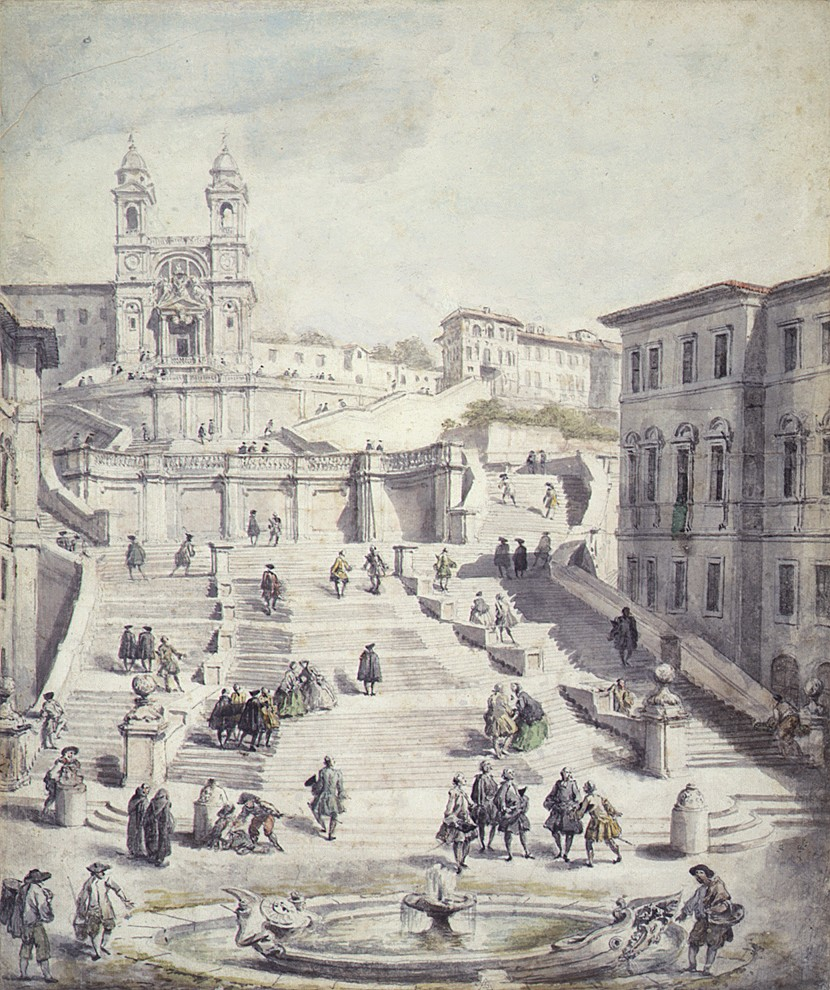
Staircase of the Trinity of Mont (ca. 1756-58), Pen, ink, wash, watercolor, and graphite, 34.8 x 29.3 cm., Metropolitan Museum of Art

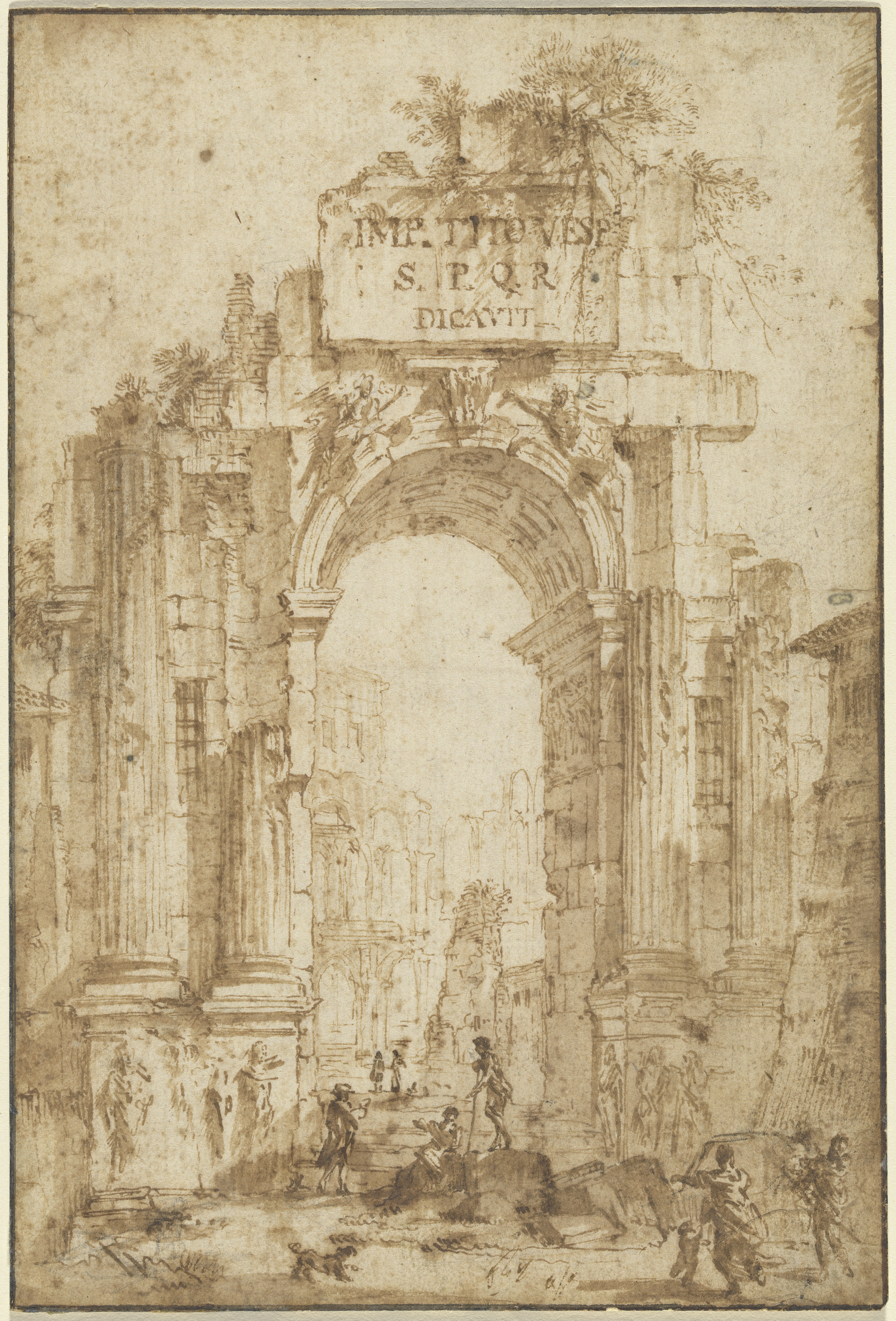
Arch of Titus (no date), pen, ink and wash, 18.7 x 12.2 cm., National Gallery of Art

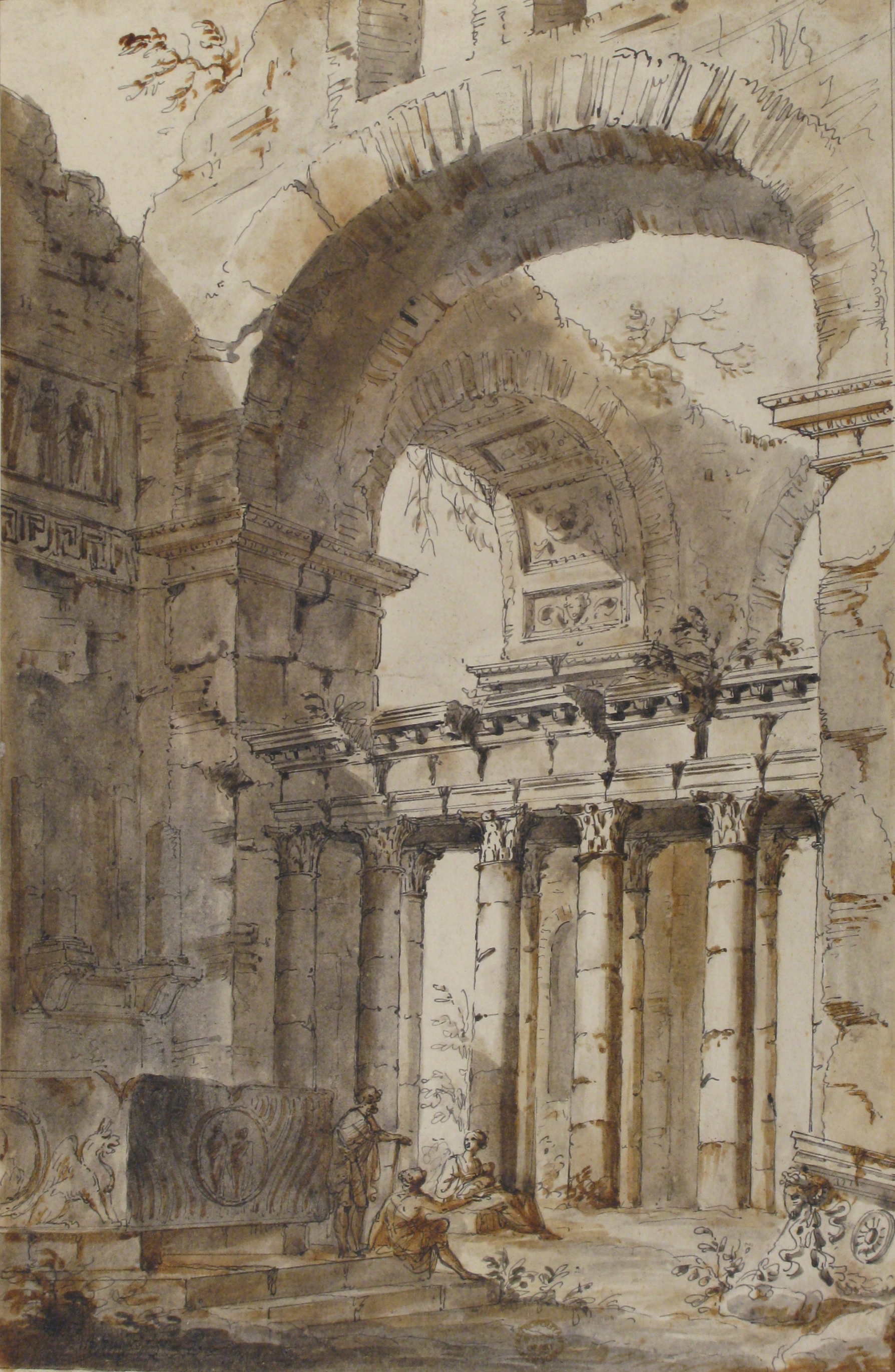
Ruins of a Basilica or Mausoleum (no date), Pen, ink, and wash, 31 x 20.6 cm., Metropolitan Museum of Art
