= Roman Capriccio: The Pantheon and Other Monuments =

Painting by Giovanni Paolo Panini

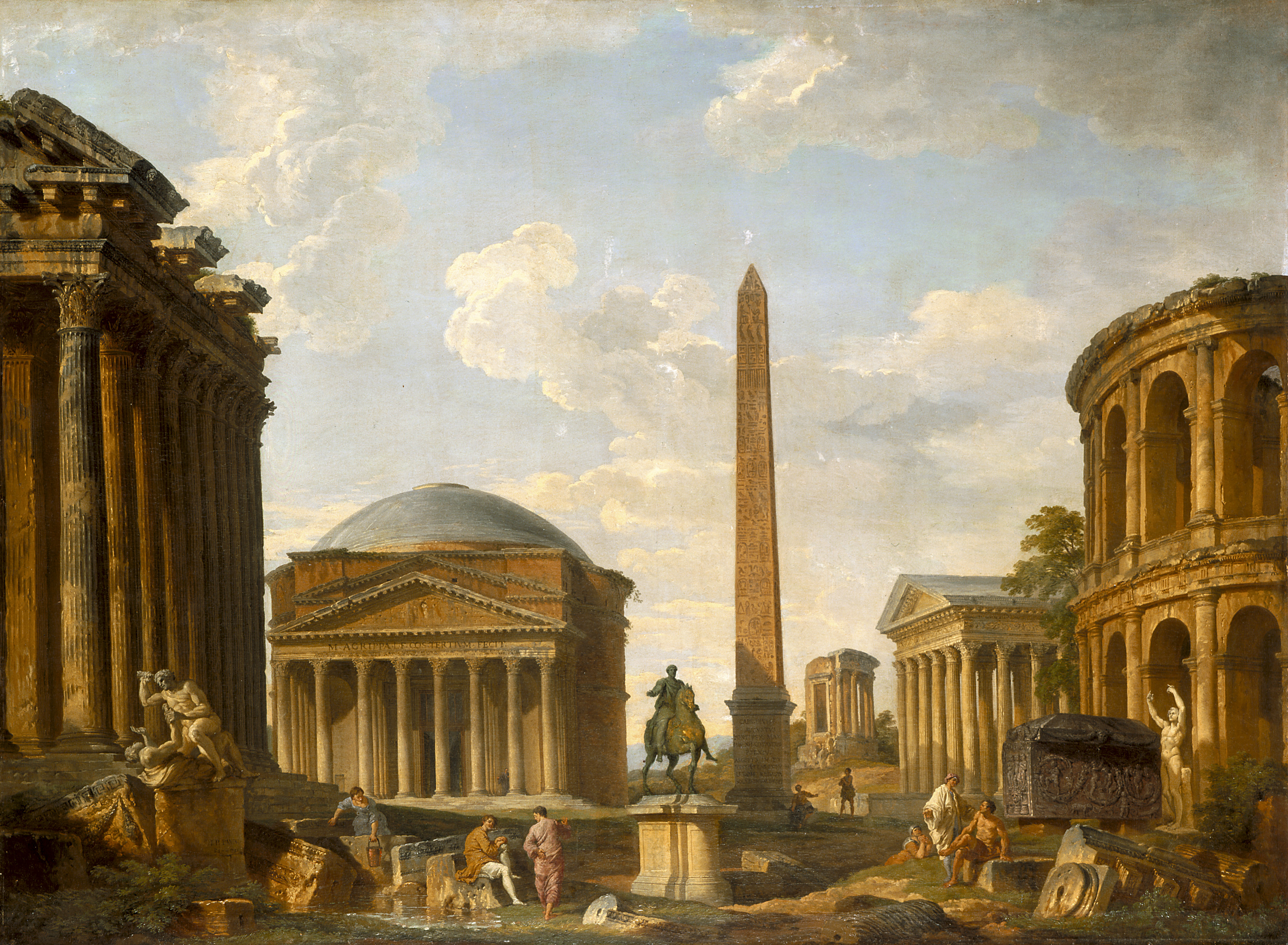
- Artist: Giovanni Paolo Panini
- Year: 1735
- Type: Oil painting on canvas
- Dimensions: 99 cm × 136 cm (39 in × 54 in)
- Location: Indianapolis Museum of Art, Indianapolis

Roman Capriccio: The Pantheon and Other Monuments is a 1735 oil painting by Italian artist Giovanni Paolo Panini, located in the Indianapolis Museum of Art, which is in Indianapolis, Indiana. It depicts an array of famous Roman monuments in a rural setting.

== Description ==
Panini was a famed painter of capriccios, architectural fantasies. In this case, he combined a staggering array of monuments by Romans without regard to topography. From left to right, he included the Temple of Hadrian, the Pantheon, the Temple of Vesta, the Maison Carrée, and the Theater of Marcellus, all of them surrounding the Obelisk of Thutmose III. In front of this overabundance of history, he placed the equestrian statue of Marcus Aurelius, around which contemporary Roman peasants carry out their business.

While quite cavalier with regard to geography, Panini was remarkably faithful in his architectural reconstructions. He carefully edited out later additions to the original buildings, such as the walled-in sections in the arches of the Theater of Marcellus and Bernini's bell towers on the Pantheon's pediment.

== Historical information ==
Panini's earliest training was with a painter of theatrical scenery, and certain elements of that early influence can be seen in this painting. The arrangement of monuments is very similar to the way architectural perspective was achieved in the Italian theater. At the front of the "stage" are the peasant-actors in quaint costumes.

Fashionable European youths undertook the Grand Tour throughout the eighteenth century, and for half a century to either side, and liked to bring back souvenirs of their travels. Thus, sketches and paintings of landmarks such as those in the Capriccio were very lucrative for Panini and his contemporaries. Escapism and contemplation were more important than geographical accuracy, so Panini was free to rearrange scenery in paintings like this. This creative reorganization led to a better comprehension of the ideal, rather than current, conditions of the monuments and the civilization that made them.

=== Acquisition ===
The IMA received Roman Capriccio: The Pantheon and Other Monuments and its pendant, The Colosseum and Other Monuments in 1950, as gifts of Lila Allison Lilly in memory of her husband, Josiah Kirby Lilly. Both are currently on view in the Jane H. Fortune Gallery. It has the accession number 50.5.

== See also ==
- Ancient Rome (painting)
