= The Lottery in Piazza di Montecitorio =

Painting by Giovanni Paolo Panini

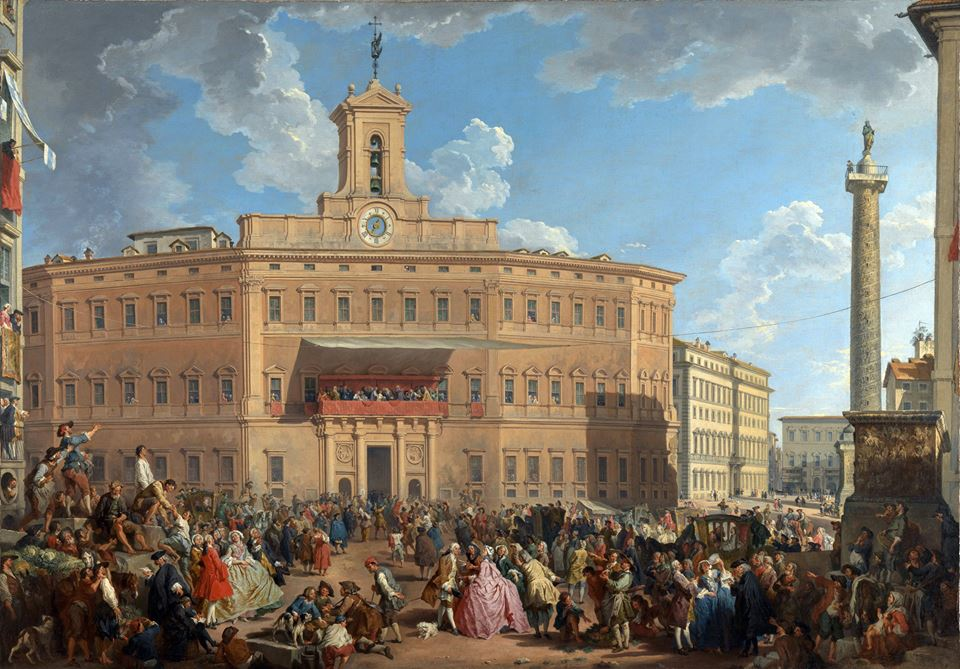
- Artist: Giovanni Paolo Panini
- Year: 1743-44
- Type: Oil on canvas, cityscape painting
- Dimensions: 105 cm × 163 cm (41 in × 64 in)
- Location: National Gallery, London

The Lottery in Piazza di Montecitorio is a 1744 oil painting by the Italian artist Giovanni Paolo Panini. A cityscape, it shows a public lottery being conducted at the Palazzo Montecitorio in Rome. A large crowd has gathered below and the winning ticket has been released from the balcony and is fluttering down. The picture was commissioned by Cardinal Domenico Orsini d'Aragona. Panini was celebrated for his contemporary views of Rome in a similar way Canaletto was known for picturing Venice.

The painting was acquired by the National Gallery in London in 2006 having been acquired in lieu of inheritance along with various donations including the Art Fund. A preparatory sketch for the painting is in the Metropolitan Museum of Art in New York.

== Bibliography ==
- Kerber, Peter Björn. Eyewitness Views: Making History in Eighteenth-century Europe. J. Paul Getty Museum, 2017.
