= Frédéric Jérôme de La Rochefoucauld =

French cardinal

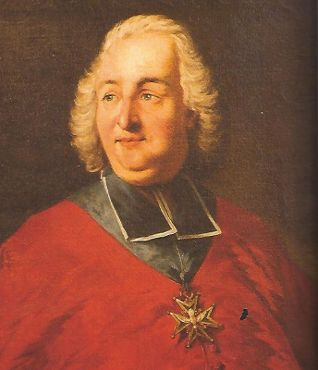
Frédéric Jérôme de La Rochefoucauld

Frédéric Jérôme de La Rochefoucauld ([fʁedeʁik ʒeʁom də la ʁɔʃfuka]; Versailles, 16 July 1701 – Paris, 29 April 1757) was a French cardinal.

== Biography ==
Born into a noble family, he was the third of the six children of François de la Rochefoucauld, count of Roye, and Catherine Françoise d'Arpajon. He studied at the Sorbonne, where he obtained a doctorate in theology.

He was elected Archbishop of Bourges in 1729, which he would remain until his death. On 2 February 1742 he was appointed commander of the Order of the Holy Spirit. He was also chosen as president of the Assembly of the Clergy which was held in April 1742, also obtaining the privilege of preparing it directly with the king instead of with his ministers. In the same year he was appointed Grand Almoner of France. In 1745 Louis XV appointed him ambassador to Pope Benedict XIV to replace the abbot of Canillac.

Pope Benedict XIV appointed him cardinal in the consistory of 10 April 1747, with the title of cardinal presbyter of Sant'Agnese fuori le mura. His musical celebration of the marriage of the king's son at the Teatro Argentina is the subject of a painting by Italian artist Giovanni Paolo Panini. In December of that year he was recalled to Paris.

He was also commendatory abbot of the Basilica of Saint-Martin d'Ainay (1747-1757), Abbey of Cluny (1747-1757) and Abbey of Saint Wandrille (1755-1757). He died in Paris on 29 April 1757, and was buried in the choir of the church of Saint-Sulpice. His heart was deposited in the church of Saint-Martin-des-Champs.

== Sources ==
- Catholic Hierarchy: Frédéric-Jérôme Cardinal de La Rochefoucauld
- Histoire du Diocèse
- cardinals.fiu.edu
