= Musical Feast Given by the Cardinal de La Rochefoucauld for the Marriage of the Dauphin =

Paintings by Giovanni Paolo Panini

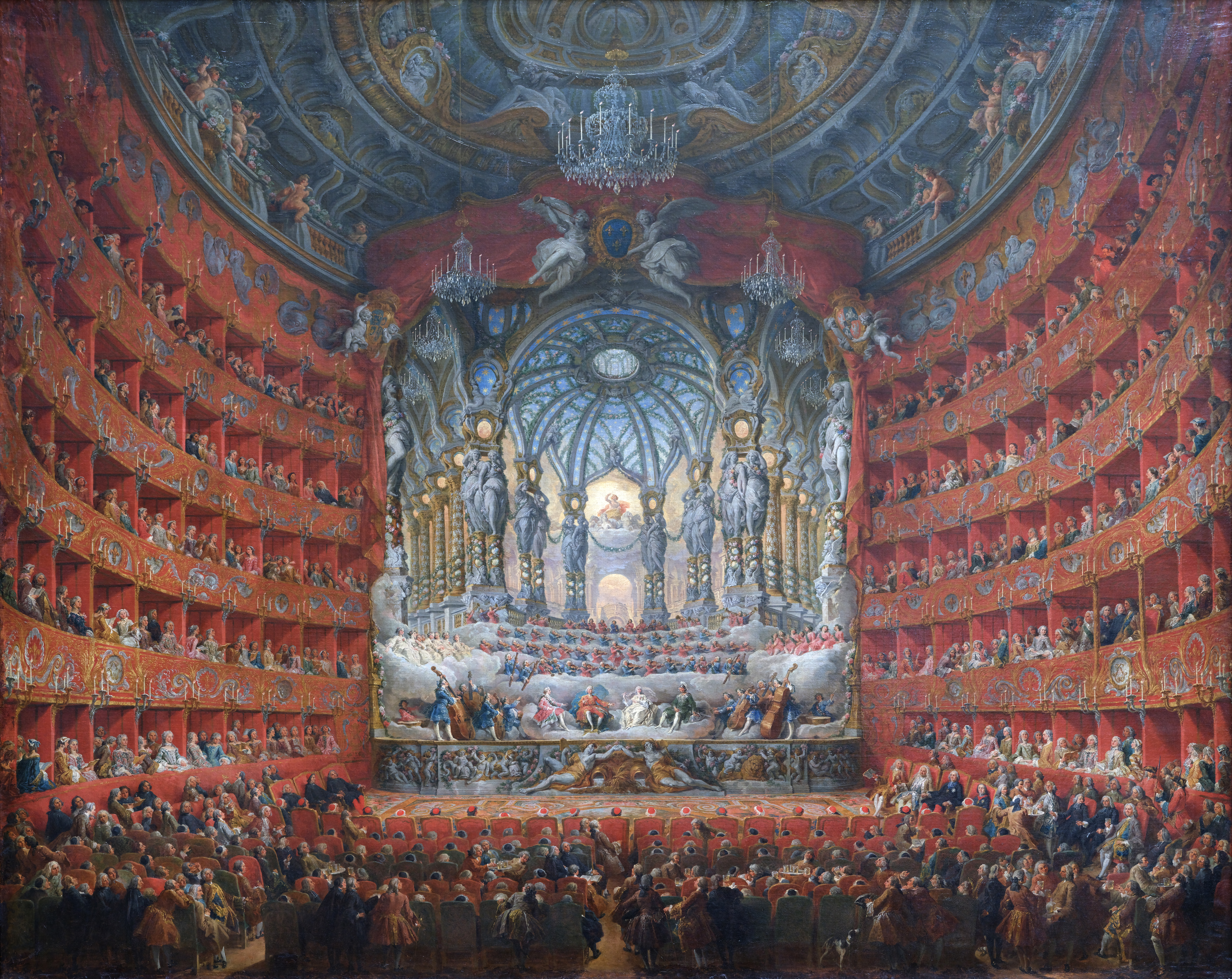
- Artist: Giovanni Paolo Panini
- Year: 1747
- Type: Oil on canvas
- Dimensions: 205 cm × 246 cm (81 in × 97 in)
- Location: Louvre, Paris

Musical Feast Given by the Cardinal de La Rochefoucauld for the Marriage of the Dauphin, with the full title of Musical Feast Given by Cardinal de La Rochefoucauld at the Argentina Theater in Rome in 1747 on the Occasion of the Marriage of the Dauphin, Son of Louis XV, is an oil-on-canvas painting by Italian artist Giovanni Paolo Panini, created in 1747. It is held at the Louvre, in Paris, under inventory number INV 414.

== History and description ==
This painting represents the musical feast given in at the Teatro Argentina, in Rome, by the Cardinal de La Rochefoucauld, the French Ambassador to the Holy See, on July 15, 1747, in honor of the marriage of the Dauphin Louis, son of Louis XV of France, with Maria Josepha of Saxony, Dauphine of France, who had been celebrated at Versailles, on February 9, 1747. France was then involved in the question of influencing the policy of the Holy See, which was more favorable to the House of Austria. This painting, commissioned by Cardinal de La Rochefoucauld, was acquired by the Louvre Museum before 1832 from the collection of King Louis Philippe.

On stage, a painted decor of fantastic columns with caryatids stands before four rows of musicians half-hidden in a decor of clouds, while the four singers, playing the role of Olympian gods dressed like in the ancient times, are seated in the front row facing the spectators. Musicians are shown on either side playing their stringed instruments of which the cellos and double basses are the most visible. Two choirs are also visible on either side of the stage. The work being performed was the baroque opera La Contesa dei Numi by Leonardo Vinci (1690–1730), composed in 1729, specially for the birth of the Dauphin, to a libretto by Pietro Metastasio.

The audience is made up of Roman cardinals, seated in the front row of the orchestra having in front of them huge carpets, with the abbots on the left. Behind them, other ecclesiastics and representatives of the Roman aristocracy are seated or standing. The ladies of Roman high society are seated in the boxes, hung with red damask, unable according to etiquette to stand in presence of the orchestra. They are accompanied by dignitaries and aristocrats. It is visible on the right in the triple box on the first floor, above the monogram of Louis XV, the presence of the exiled pretender James III of England, who is wearing the blue cord of the Order of the Garter, with his son, the Cardinal of York, at his right. At his side, seated on a red armchair with high back, is Cardinal de La Rochefoucauld himself, dressed in black, with the red collar of the Order of the Holy Spirit, followed by the Scottish James Murray, Earl of Dunbar, wearing the green cord of the Order of the Thistle.
