= Modern Rome =

Painting by Giovanni Paolo Panini

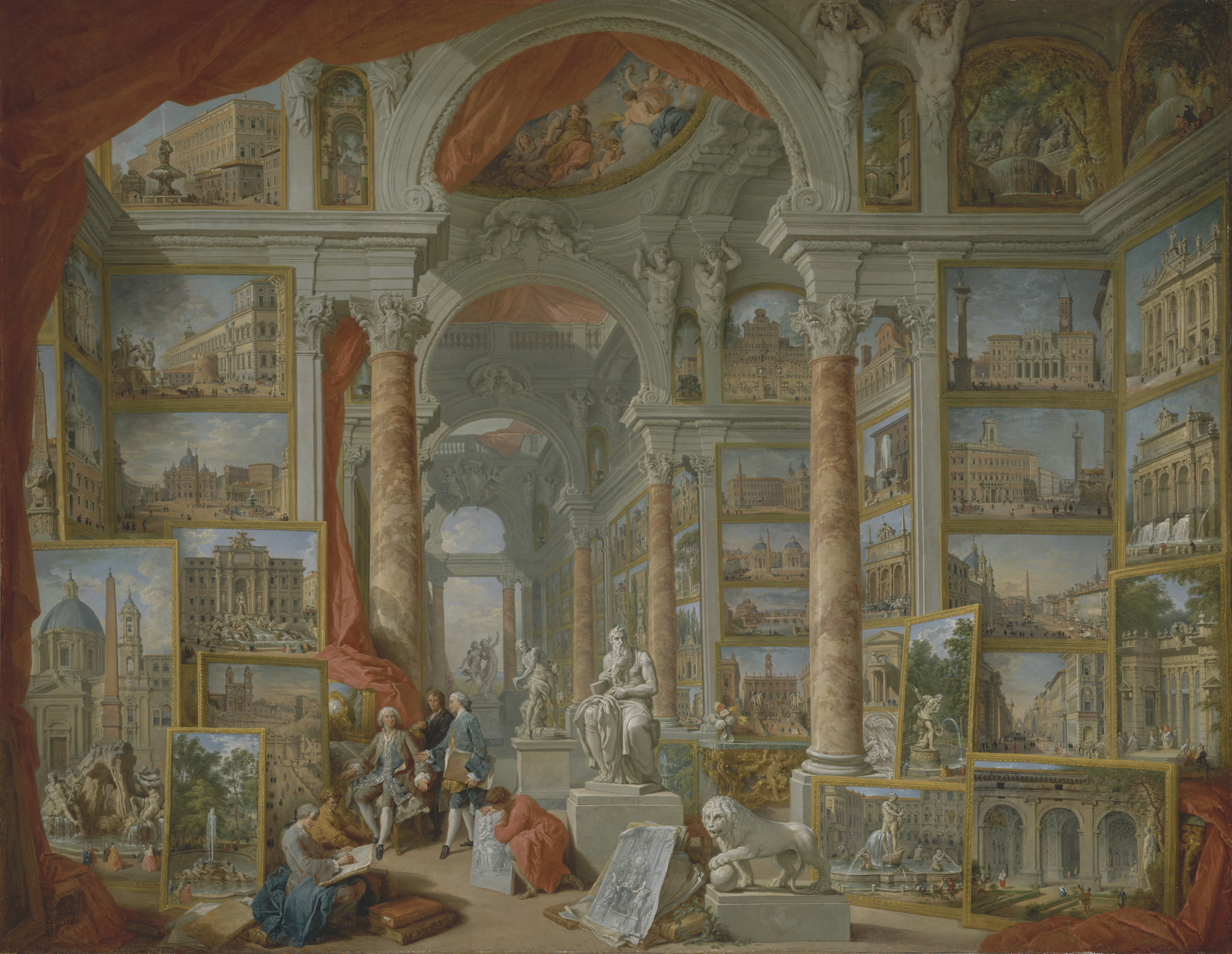
- Artist: Giovanni Paolo Panini
- Year: 1758
- Medium: Oil on canvas
- Dimensions: 172.1 cm × 233 cm (67 3/4 in × 91 3/4 in)
- Location: Museum of Fine Arts, Boston

Picture Gallery with Views of Modern Rome, known simply as Modern Rome, is a trio of almost identical paintings by Italian artist Giovanni Paolo Panini in the 1750s. The original painting shows the arrangement of paintings originally commissioned by Étienne François, Count of Stainville, later the Duke de Choiseul. He was the ambassador to Rome from between 1753 and 1757. In the painting, Stainville is seated on an armchair. Panini created three different versions of this painting. He created two versions of the painting, both dated 1757, for the Count of Stainville – the original is at the Museum of Fine Arts, Boston, while the second is at the Metropolitan Museum of Art in New York. A couple of years later, he created a slightly different version of this painting for Claude-François de Montboissier de Canillac de Beaufort, which now hangs at the Louvre in Paris.

The picture gallery consists of a large number of paintings of buildings, monuments, and sculptures in Rome during the time that Panini painted it. On the left side of this work are, among others, paintings of St. Peter's Basilica, the Trevi Fountain, and the Spanish Steps. On the right side are, among others, paintings of the church of Santa Maria Maggiore, the Piazza Navona, and Villa Aldobrandini. In the middle are four statues, which are from front to back, the Medici lion, Michelangelo's Moses, Bernini's statue of David, and Bernini's statue of Apollo and Daphne.

The painting is the pendant to Panini's Ancient Rome painting. The Metropolitan Museum of Art and the Louvre have a version of both paintings, Modern Rome and Ancient Rome. The third version of Ancient Rome is held by the Staatsgalerie Stuttgart.

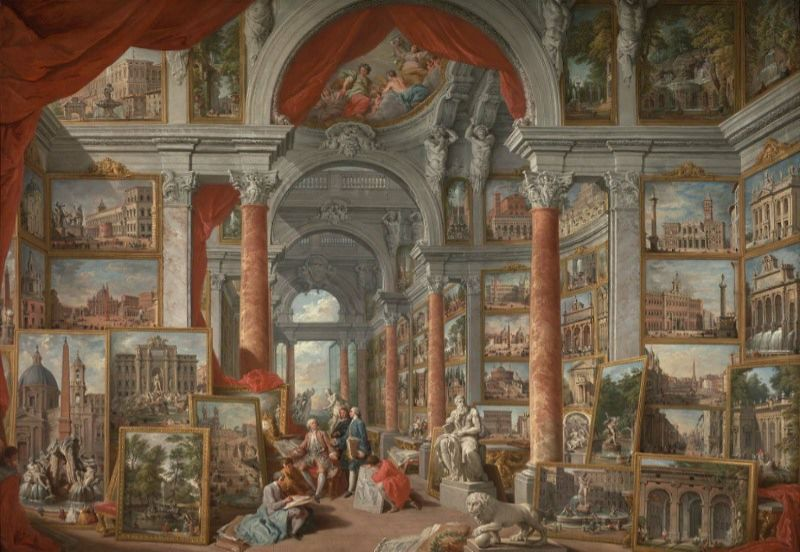
First version, Museum of Fine Arts, Boston

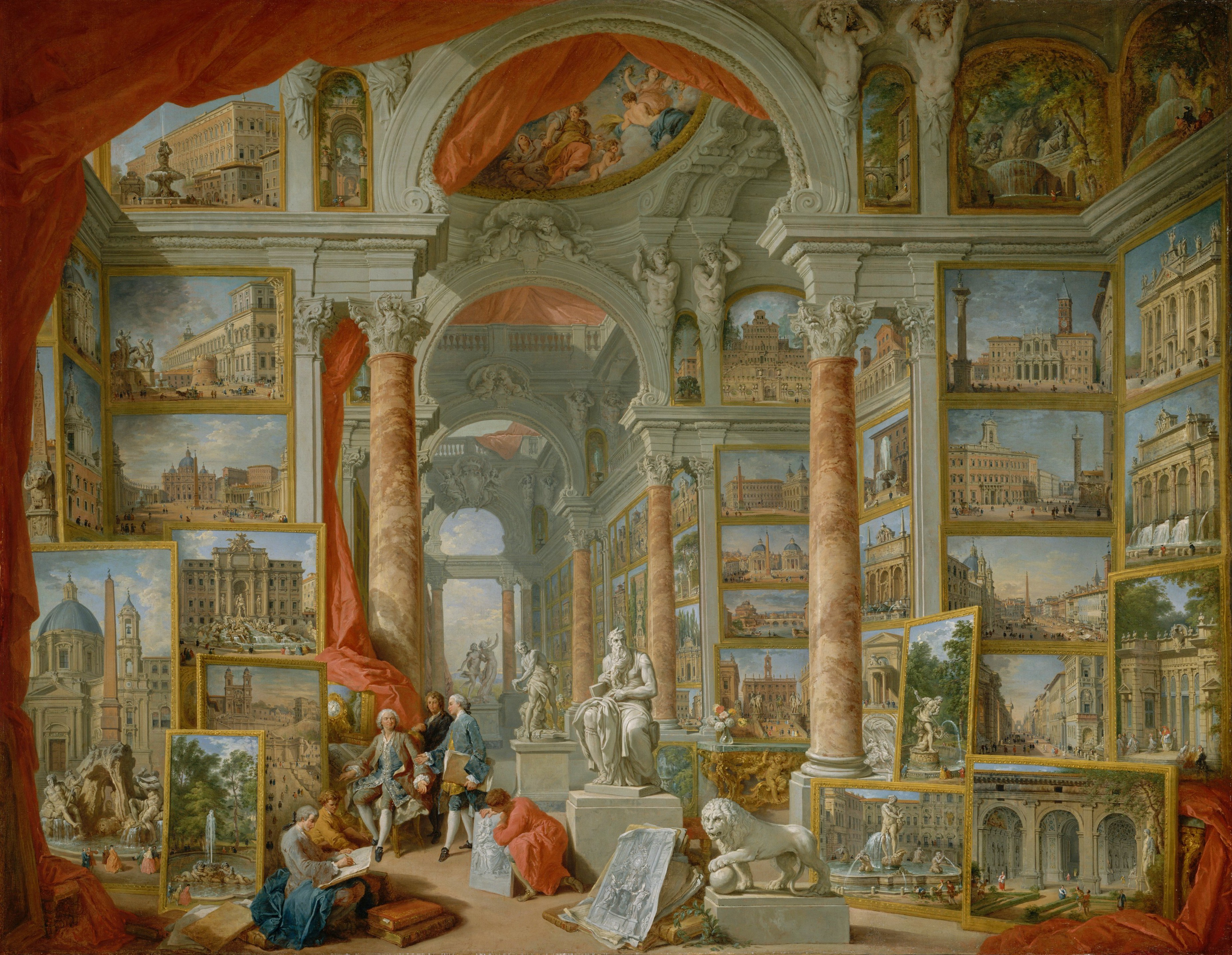
Second version, Metropolitan Museum of Art

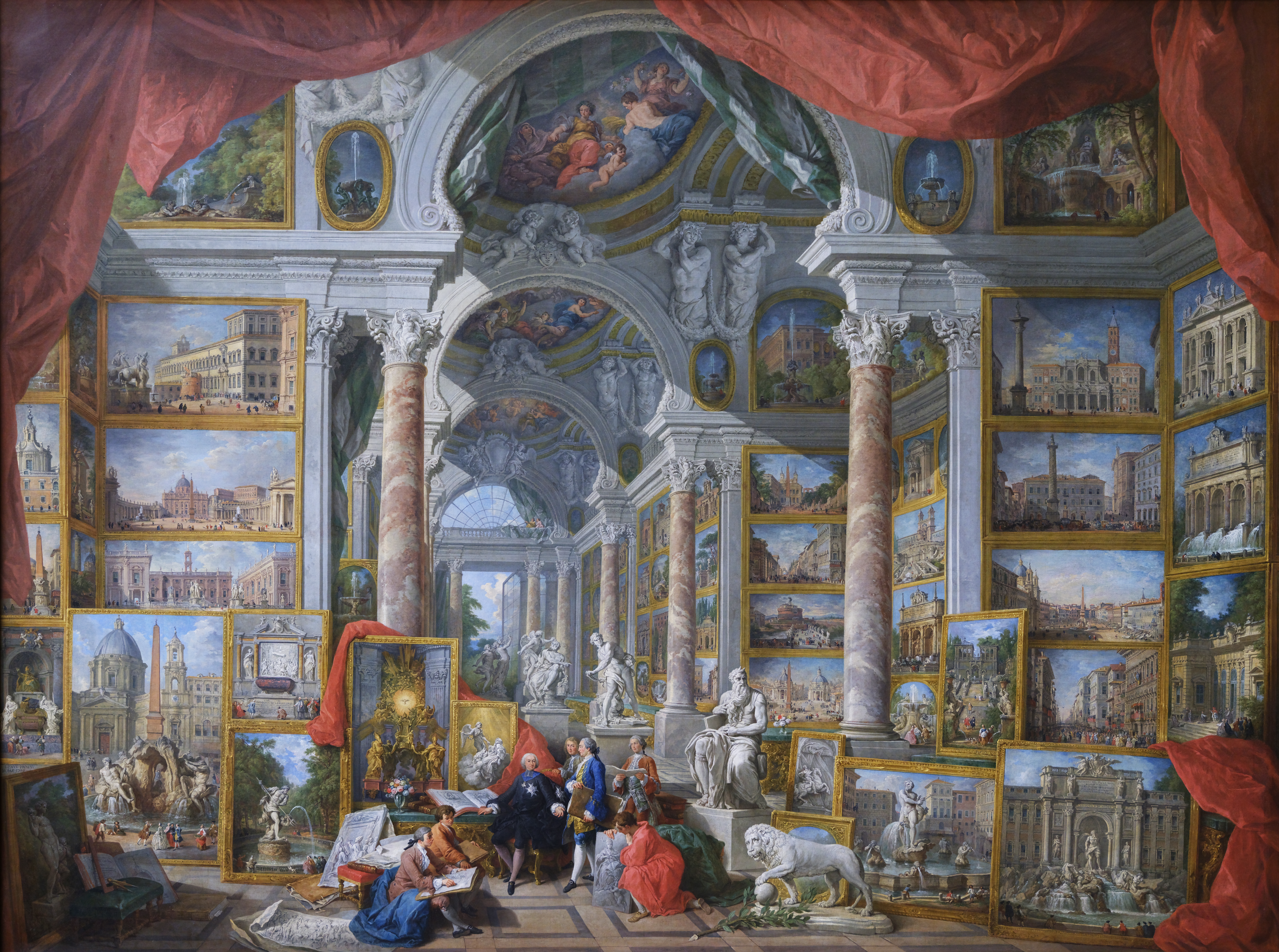
Third version, Louvre
