= Biblioteca Passerini-Landi =

Coordinates: 45°03′09″N 9°41′45″E

The Biblioteca Passerini-Landi is the main library of the comune of Piacenza, region of Emilia-Romagna, Italy.

A Royal Library was established in 1774 by Ferdinand, Duke of Parma, and sited at the former home of the Jesuit Seminary of San Pietro. In 1768, the Jesuit order had been expelled from the Duchy, and their collections had been confiscated. The library was placed under the guidance of the priest Cristoforo Poggiali and began functions by 1778. In 1791, the library was joined with the Biblioteca Passerini, established by Count Pier Francesco Passerini and owned by the Collegio of Theologians, and their collections were moved to San Pietro. The library was secularized during the Napoleonic administration. In 1878, the library acquired its present name to commemorate the donation, earlier in the century, of his library by Marchese Ferdinando Landi.

The library was expanded with duplicates from the library of Parma and the contents of the Libreria Cardani of Modena. In 1799, the collection gained books from the suppression of the Augustinian monastery. In the early 19th century, Giuseppe Poggi donated his collection, including the 9th-century psalter of the empress Ermengarde of Hesbaye. The Pallastrelli endowment included troves of documents of local history. The Landi endowment includes a 1336 manuscript of the Divine Comedy.

== See also ==
- List of Jesuit sites
