= Ancient Rome (painting) =

1750s paintings by Giovanni Paolo Panini

Roma Antica
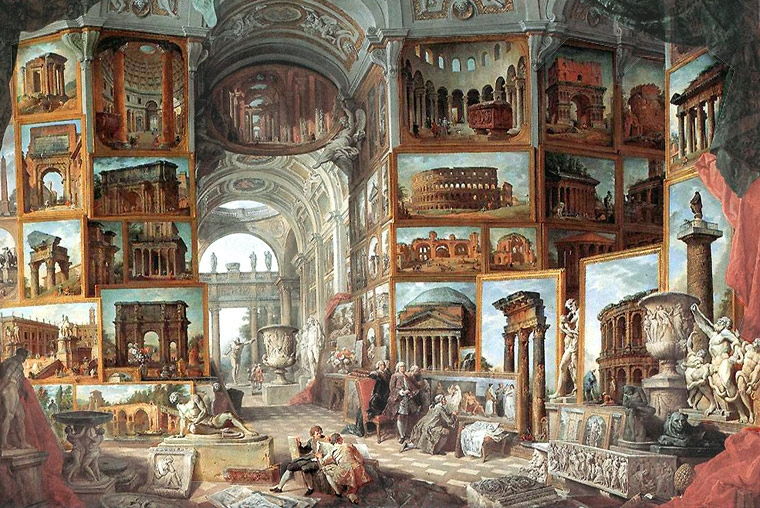
- Artist: Giovanni Paolo Panini
- Year: 1754–1757
- Dimensions: 169 cm × 227 cm (67 in × 89 in)
- Location: Staatsgalerie, Stuttgart

Ancient Rome
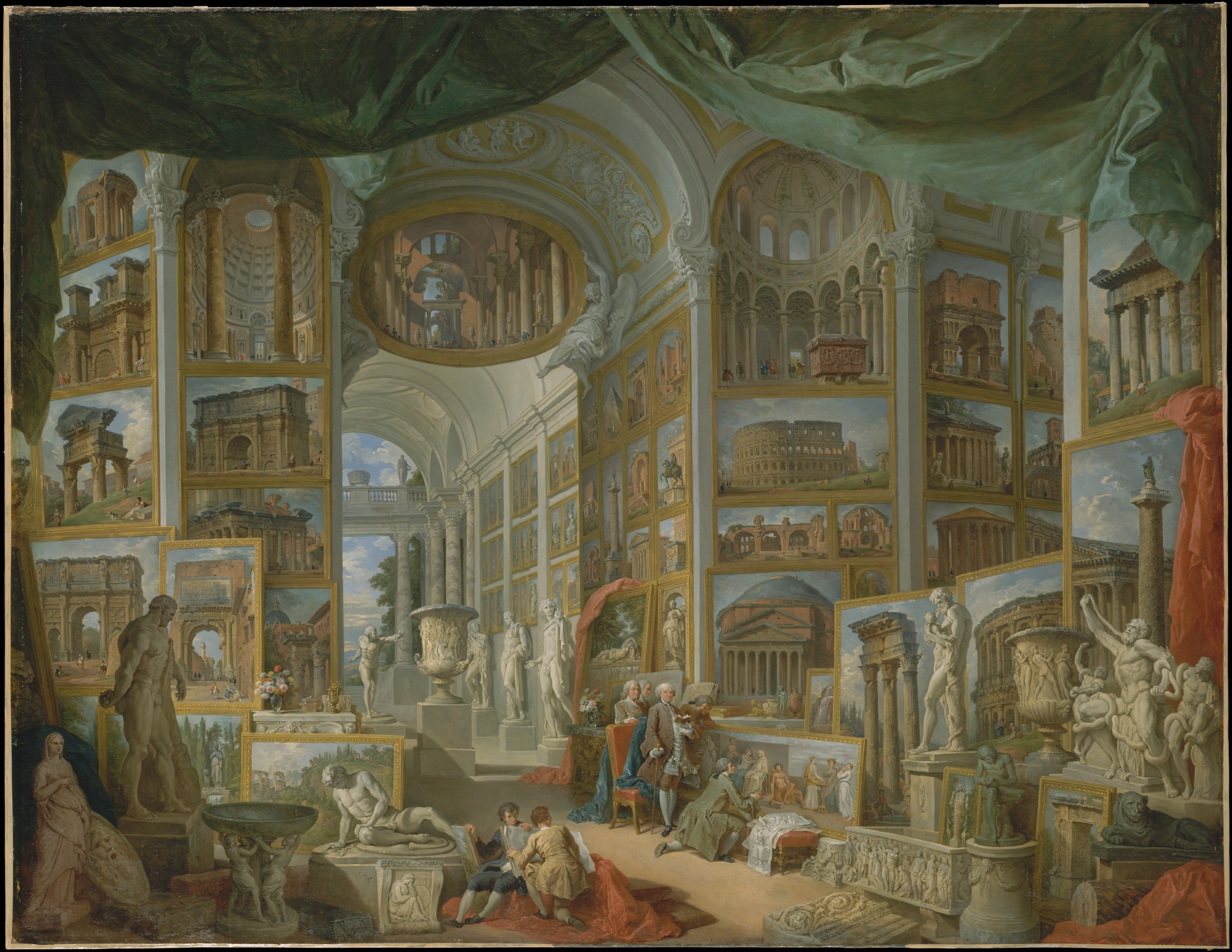
- Artist: Giovanni Paolo Panini
- Year: 1757
- Medium: Oil on canvas
- Dimensions: 172.1 cm × 229.9 cm (67.75 in × 90.5 in)
- Location: Metropolitan Museum of Art, New York

Gallery of Views of Ancient Rome
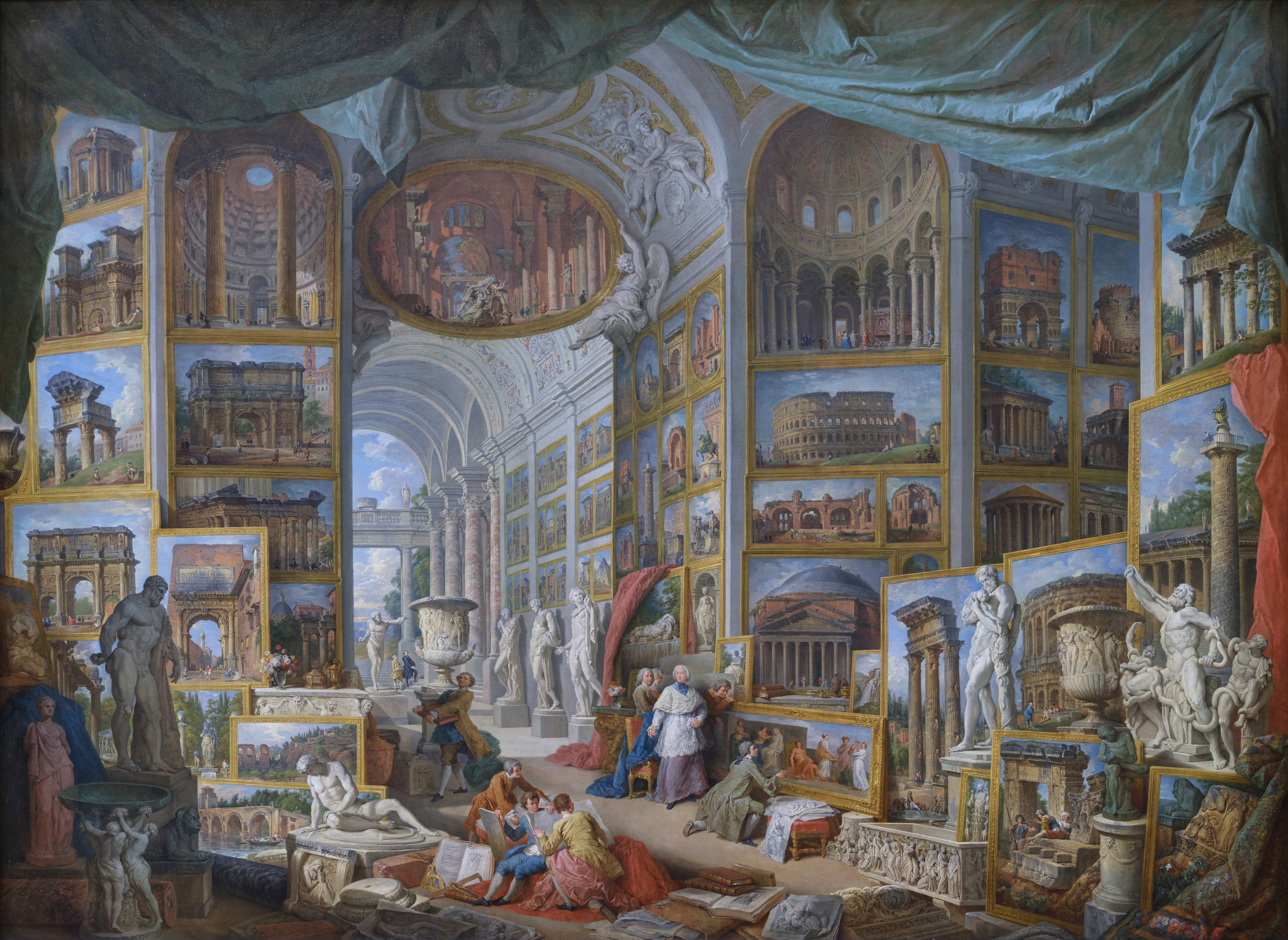
- Artist: Giovanni Paolo Panini
- Year: 1759
- Dimensions: 231 cm × 303 cm (91 in × 119 in)
- Location: Louvre, Paris

Ancient Rome is a trio of almost identical paintings by Italian artist Giovanni Paolo Panini, produced as pendant paintings to Modern Rome for his patron, the comte de Stainville, in the 1750s.

The paintings depict many of the most significant architectural sites and sculptures from ancient Rome, such as the Colosseum, the Pantheon, Laocoön and His Sons, the Farnese Hercules, the Apollo Belvedere and the Borghese Gladiator. Both Panini and Stainville are featured: Stainville stands holding a guidebook, while Panini appears behind Stainville's armchair.

The three versions of Ancient Rome, in order of creation, are located in the Staatsgalerie Stuttgart, the Metropolitan Museum of Art in New York and the Louvre in Paris. The Metropolitan Museum of Art and the Louvre each hold a version of Panini's companion piece, Modern Rome; and the third version is in the Museum of Fine Arts, Boston.

== History ==
In 1749, Giovanni Pannini painted the Gallery of Cardinal Silvio Valenti Gonzaga, a painting representing Valenti Gonzaga inside a huge gallery whose walls are covered with reproductions of the paintings he owns. This composition, featuring an imaginary architecture dedicated to the exhibition of an artistic collection, is the basis of the Gallery of Views.

Between 1753 and 1757, Count Étienne François de Choiseul, Louis XV's ambassador to Rome in the 1740s, commissioned four paintings from Pannini: the Galleries of Views of Ancient Rome and Modern Rome, a view of the Place Saint-Peter and an Interior of St. Peter's Basilica. These paintings were made between 1754 and 1757. In 1757, the Count de Choiseul commissioned a second execution of these four paintings from him.

In 1758-1759, Pannini produced another version of the two Galleries on behalf of Claude-François de Montboissier de Canillac de Beaufort, abbot of Canillac and charge d'affaires at the French embassy in Rome. These versions are not identical to the previous ones: the paintings and sculptures are not depicted as hanging in the same places, some are missing between the two versions and the figures do not occupy the same positions.
