= Democrates (disambiguation) =

Democrates was a Greek philosopher about the first century BC, to whom the Golden Sayings are usually attributed.

Democrates may also refer to:

== People ==
- Democrates of Aphidna, an Athenian politician of the fourth century BC.
- Servilius Damocrates or Democrates, a first-century Greek physician at Rome.

== See also ==
- Damocrates
- Democritus
- Democritus (disambiguation)
