= Democritus (disambiguation) =

Democritus (c. 460–370 BC) was an Ancient Greek philosopher notable for his atomic theory of the universe.

Democritus may also refer to:

- Democritus (Agostino Carracci), a c.1596 oil on canvas painting
- Democritus (Ribera), a 1630 oil on canvas painting by Jusepe de Ribera
- Democritus (crater), an impact crater on the Moon
- Christianus Democritus, pen name of Johann Konrad Dippel (1673–1734), German Pietist theologian, physician, alchemist and occultist
- Democritus of Megara, winner of the Stadion race, 152nd Olympiad, 172 BC

== See also ==
- Democritus University of Thrace
