= Archery Contest of Diana and her Nymphs =

Painting by Domenichino

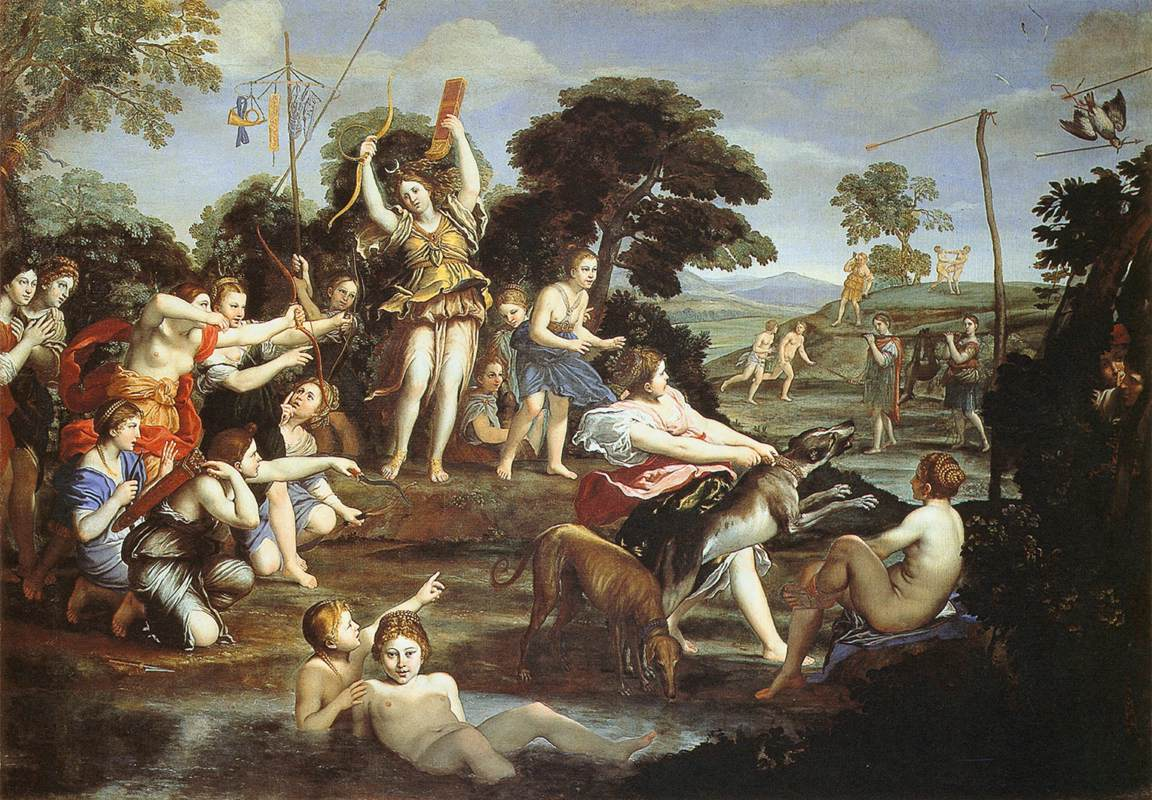
- Artist: Domenichino
- Year: 1616
- Medium: oil on canvas
- Dimensions: 225 cm × 320 cm (89 in × 130 in)
- Location: Galleria Borghese, Rome

The Archery Contest of Diana and Her Nymphs is a 1616 oil-on-canvas painting by the Italian artist Domenichino. The painting is also known as Diana and her Nymphs after the Hunt, Diana Hunting, and even The Hunt of Diana. It was commissioned by Cardinal Pietro Aldobrandini, but was stolen from him by Cardinal Scipione Borghese. It is now in the Galleria Borghese in Rome, Italy.

== Artist ==
Domenichino was born Domenico Zampieri in Bologna, Italy in the year 1581. Domenichino was a student of Flemish art, and studied under the artist Denys Calvaert, until he moved to Rome where he worked in the teams employed by the Carracci, including the frescoes designed by Annibale for the Palazzo Farnese where he acquired the nickname Domenichino, meaning little Domenico. He then became a favored assistant to Annibale Carracci himself. Domenichino was later commissioned by both Cardinal Pietro Aldobrandini and Cardinal Scipione Borghese.

This painting was completed after Domenichino had done a large series of frescoes between 1612 and 1615 on Saint Cecilia. At this point he was developing his own style, distinct from that of the Carracci. The classical style that is now associated with Domenichino had stemmed from this series.

== Commission ==
=== Pietro Aldobrandini ===
This painting was originally commissioned by Cardinal Pietro Aldobrandini and was meant to complement the Titian paintings already owned by the Cardinal. However the Titian paintings were not originally owned or commissioned by Aldobrandini.

Pietro Aldobrandini was the nephew of Pope Clement VIII. However, once the Borghese family rose to power, Pope Clement VIII, along with his family, fell from favor. Aldobrandini used art as a way to escape from every day stresses of being a cardinal. He was an avid collector of both Titian and Annibale Carracci. This explains Pietro Aldobrandini's interest in Domenichino's works, as he was a student of Carracci. Aldobrandini's collection of Titian works came from confiscated goods after the d'Este family was annexed from Rome and featured The Worship of Venus and The Bacchanal of the Andrians.

=== Scipione Borghese ===
After the death of Pope Clement VIII, Pope Paul V took over the church. His nephew, Scipione Caffarella, not content with only being the nephew of the pope, was eventually adopted by the pope, therefore becoming Scipione Borghese.

The animosity between Scipione Borghese and Pietro Aldobrandini stemmed from Borghese being the successor as Cardinal-nephew after Aldobrandini. The Borghese family also supported many artists throughout their time in power. Scipione possessed many mythological works, including works of the Muses by Giovanni Baglione to complement his collection. The majority of the Borghese collection was forcefully acquired from other artists and patrons after they had been either exiled or stripped of power and wealth.

While this work had initially been commissioned by Pietro Aldobrandini, Scipione approached the painter, and urged him to complete the commission for him. Loyal to the Aldobrandini family, Domenichino refused. He was promptly imprisoned by Borghese.

== Subject matter ==
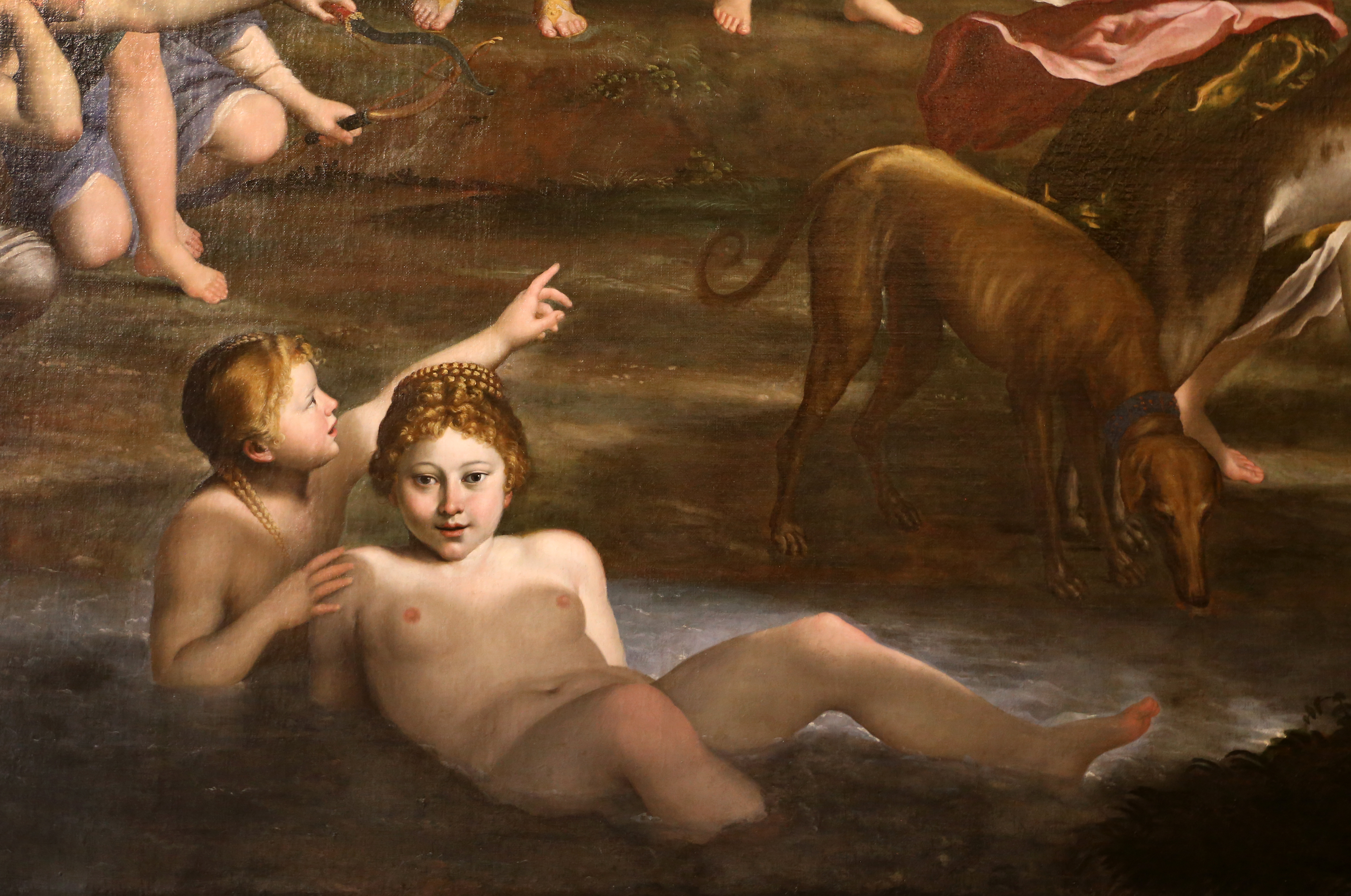
Detail of a nymph in Archery Contest of Diana and her Nymphs

As the title states, the subject matter is that of a mythological scene depicting Diana, the goddess of the hunt, the moon, virginity, and wild animals. This painting shows Domenichino's capability with landscape painting as well as his knowledge and familiarity with antiquity art styles. The men within the painting serve as allegories, representing all manner of things; namely, spying, lust, risk, and ultimately, the danger that they are putting themselves in due to their own actions.

Regarding the nymphs, there is one in the water that is looking directly at the viewer. This is Domenichino's way of bringing the audience into the painting, breaking down the barrier of viewer and subject. The nymph is smiling, as if she has caught the viewer in the bushes, watching this scene play out, therefore likening the viewer to the men in the painting.

Diana is most easily identifiable in this painting due to the upside-down crescent moon tiara on her head. Normally, she can also be identified by her bow and quiver of arrows.

=== Source material ===
The painting depicts, as the title states, an archery contest with the goddess Diana and the nymphs that were her followers. As discussed in many classical sources such as Virgil's Aeneid, Hesiod's Theogony as well as Homer's epic poem The Iliad, this scene is depicting the goddess and the others after a hunt. Diana was often depicted in texts and works as a child, rather than a grown woman. Similarly, her nymphs were often portrayed in the same way as the goddess's blessing kept them from aging.

== Style ==
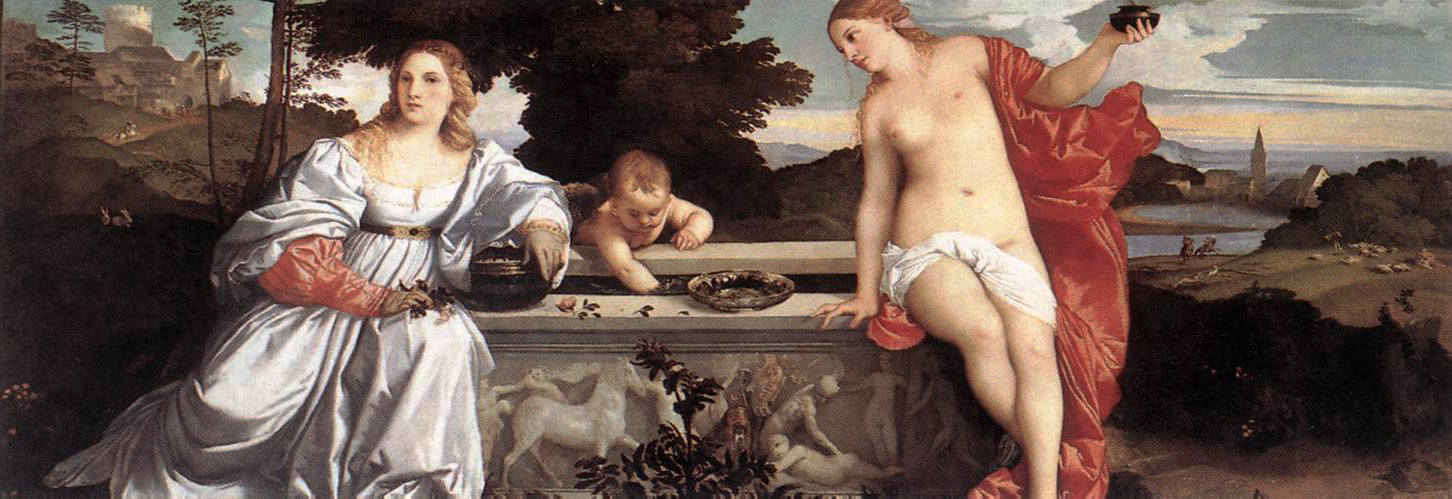
Sacred and Profane Love by Titian

Domenichino's style is heavily based on nature, as he believed that to be the critical foundation for all artworks. Moreover, he heavily studied the forms of antique sculptures to influence his way of depicting the human figure. This also accounts to his attention to detail to illustrate these figures in the clothing of the time that the painting takes place, rather than the clothing that the artist would have seen in his days. Domenichino believed that depicting large scale events was the proper way to immerse the viewer into the work, rather than simply telling the bones of the story. The chaotic nature of the scene explains how the men were able to sneak up to spy on the goddess and her followers. There are now many themes at work in this painting; a historic scene, a landscape, and a lesson being taught. His works of art paired well with those of Titian.

== Historical context ==
=== Papal nephews in Rome ===
Early in a pope's reign, they would appoint their nephews, typically their closest male relative, to a high position of power. These papal nephews, or Cardinal-Nephews, were often given authority but not much to oversee. Therefore, they frequently became important patrons of the arts. At this time however, nepotism was a significant problem in the Church. As was seen with Scipione Borghese, the power often was not enough for those as nephews and they demanded more. Allowing the family of the pope and unelected or under-qualified officials into these positions of power more often led to superfluous spending of the church's money.

=== Roman collecting of mythological works ===
Domenichino's studies of Flemish art shows a larger theme of the seventeenth century. At this time the most common themes of art were religious or mythological. Depicting mythology at this time was a way of showing how well educated one was, as this often required reading the myths in their original language. Mythological art was often held in private residences as it could be seen as going against the church with its pagan depictions. When a guest was waiting for the person of the house to arrive, or when guests were over for large celebrations, this strategically displayed art allowed others to see the knowledge, and more specifically, the power and authority that these patrons held.

== Bibliography ==
- Askew, Pamela. “Ferdinando Gonzaga's Patronage of the Pictorial Arts: The Villa Favorita.” The Art Bulletin, vol. 60, no. 2, 1978, pp. 274–296. JSTOR 3049783.
- Cogniat, Raymond (1964). Seventeenth-century painting. New York: Viking Press.
- "Diana Hunting". ArtStor.
- "Diana's Hunt". Galleria Borghese.
- "Domenichino (1581 - 1641). Metropolitan Museum of Art.
- "Domenichino (Domenico Zampieri)". The J. Paul Getty Museum.
- "Domenichino (Domenico Zampieri)". FAMSF Search the Collections. 2018-09-21.
- "Domenichino's The Hunt of Diana a Painting about Spying and its Unfortunate Results". Roma Non Per Tutti.
- "Galleria Borghese - Artworks". www.the-athenaeum.org. Retrieved 2019-04-29.
- Hesiod (2009). Theogony. Oxford University Press. ISBN 978-0199538317.
- Harris, Ann Sutherland (2008). Seventeenth-Century Art and Architecture. London: Laurence King. p. 61.
- Hill, Michael (December 2001). "The Patronage of a Disenfranchised Nephew: Cardinal Scipione Borghese and the Restoration of San Crisogono in Rome, 1618-1628". Journal of the Society of Architectural Historians. Vol. 60 No. 4: 432–449
- Homer (1999). The Iliad. Penguin Classics. ISBN 978-0147712554.
- Hyde Minor, Heather (March 2006). ""Amore regolato": Papal Nephews and Their Palaces in Eighteenth-Century Rome". Journal of the Society of Architectural Historians. Vol. 65 No. 1: 68–91.
- Spooner, S. (1865). A Biographical History of the Fine Arts: Being Memoirs of the Lives and Works of Eminent Painters, Engravers, Sculptors, and Architects. From the Earliest Ages to the Present Time. Alphabetically Arranged, and Condensed from the Best Authorities. New York: J. W. Bouton.
- "Titian". www.mappingtitian.org. Retrieved 2019-04-18.
- Virgil (1937). Aeneid. New York : Collier.
- Waddy, Patricia (2008). Italian Baroque Art, “Inside the Palace: People and Furnishings”. Blackwell Publishers. pp. 178–194. ISBN 978-1-4051-3967-0
