= Domenichino =

Italian painter (1581–1641)

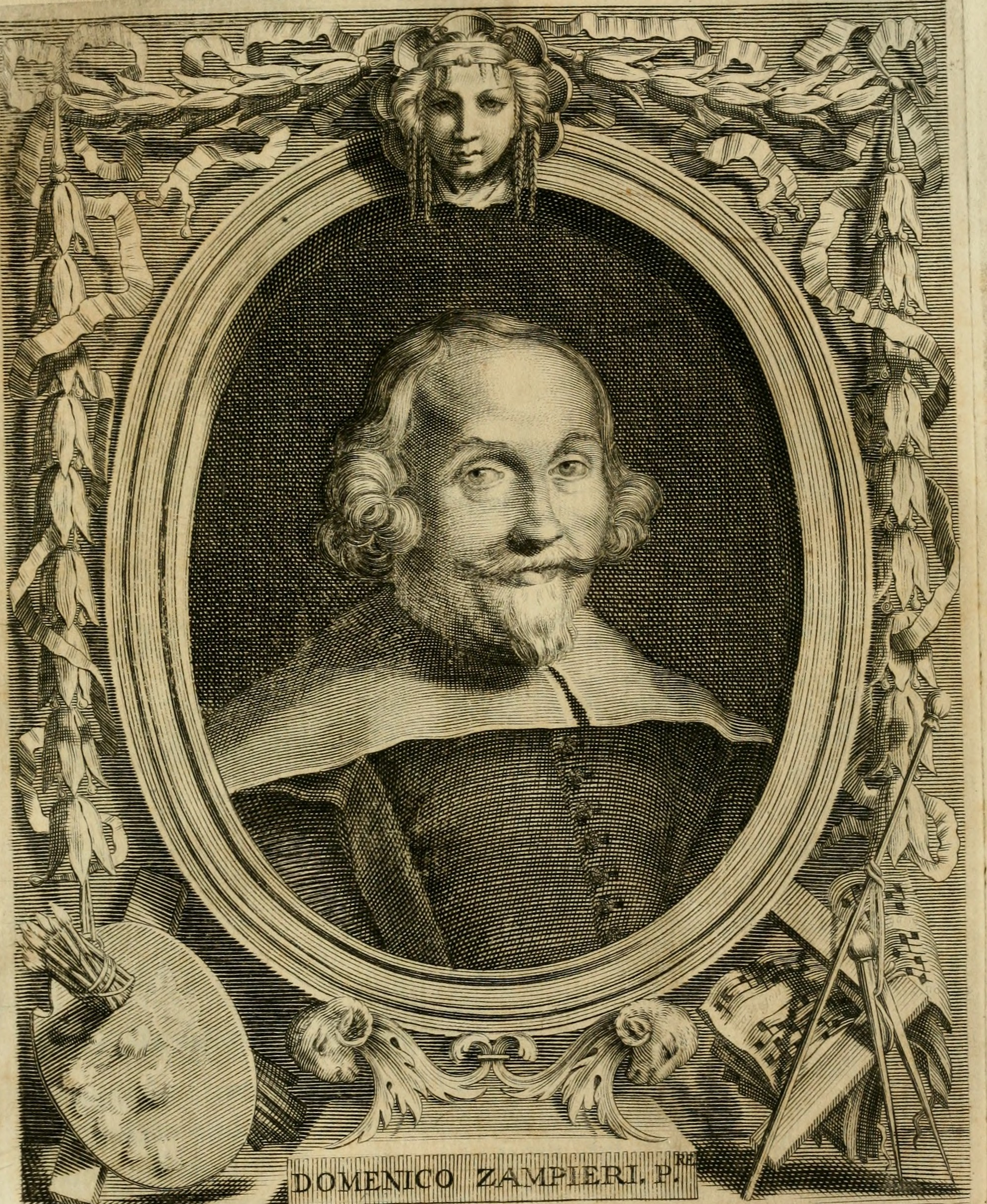
- Domenichino, in a portrait by an unknown artist
- Born: Domenico Zampieri; October 21, 1581; Bologna, Papal States
- Died: April 6, 1641 (aged 59); Naples, Kingdom of Naples
- Known for: Painting
- Movement: Baroque

Domenico Zampieri (US: /ˌtsɑːmpiˈɛəri, ˌzɑːm-/, Italian: [doˈmeːniko ddzamˈpjɛːri]; October 21, 1581 – April 6, 1641), known by the diminutive Domenichino (US: /doʊˌmeɪnɪˈkiːnoʊ, -ˌmɛn-/, Italian: [domeniˈkiːno]) after his shortness, was an Italian Baroque painter of the Bolognese School of painters.

== Life ==
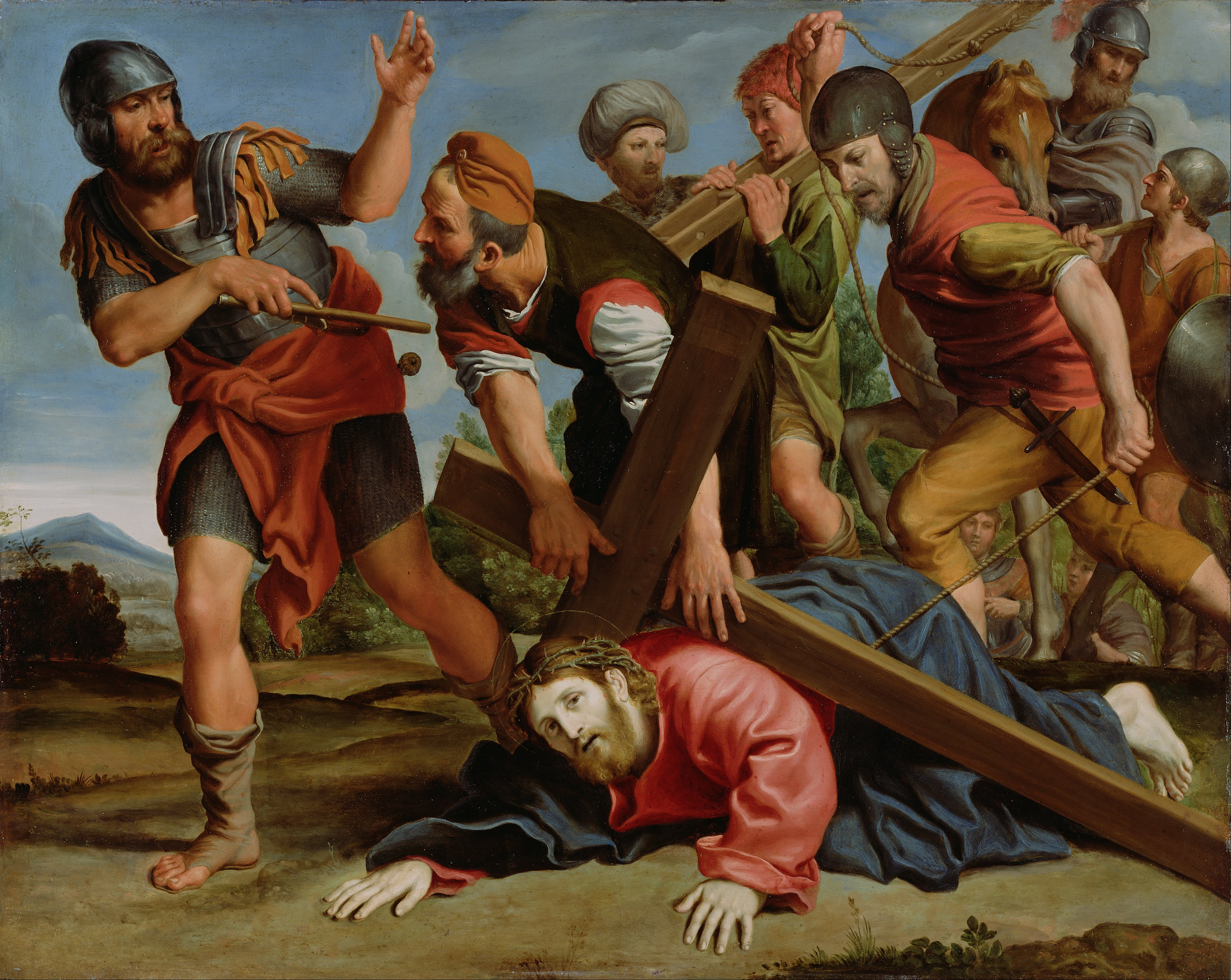
The Way to Calvary, Getty Center, c. 1610

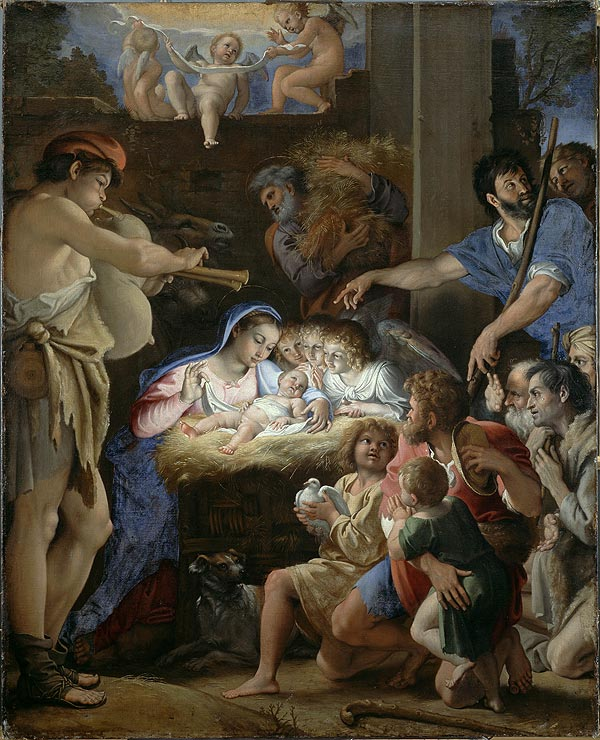
The Adoration of the Shepherds, c. 1607–1610, oil on canvas, 143 x 115 cm, National Gallery of Scotland

Domenichino was born in Bologna, son of a shoemaker, and there initially studied under Denis Calvaert. After quarreling with Calvaert, he left to work in the Accademia degli Incamminati of the Carracci where, because of his small stature, he was nicknamed Domenichino, meaning "little Domenico" in Italian. He left Bologna for Rome in 1602 and became one of the most talented apprentices to emerge from Annibale Carracci's supervision. As a young artist in Rome he lived with his slightly older Bolognese colleagues Albani and Guido Reni, and worked alongside Lanfranco, who later would become a chief rival.

In addition to assisting Annibale with completion of his frescoes in the Galleria Farnese, including A Virgin with a Unicorn (c. 1604–05), he painted three of his own frescoes in the Loggia del Giardino of the Palazzo Farnese c. 1603–04. With the support of Monsignor Giovanni Battista Agucchi, the maggiordomo to Cardinal Aldobrandini and later Gregory XV, and Giovanni's brother Cardinal Girolamo Agucchi, Domenichino obtained further commissions in Rome. His most important project of the first decade was decoration of the Cappella dei Santissimi Fondatori in the medieval basilica of the Abbey of Grottaferrata (1608–1610), some 20 kilometers outside Rome, where Odoardo Farnese was the titular abbot. Meanwhile, he had completed frescoes c. 1604–05 in the church of Sant'Onofrio, feigned stucco decoration of 1606–07 in the Palazzo Mattei, a large scene of The Flagellation of St. Andrew at San Gregorio Magno, painted in competition with a fresco by Reni that faces it, and a ceiling with Scenes from the Life of Diana, 1609, in the Villa Odescalchi at Bassano di Sutri (today Bassano Romano).

Following Annibale Carracci's death in 1609, the pupils who had followed Annibale's Roman style, including Domenichino and Francesco Albani, were not as successful at gaining the most prestigious commissions as Guido Reni. As Donald Posner stated in his influential thesis, The Roman Style of Annibale Carracci and His School, '...it should be stressed that the severe classicism of Annibale's late style had an immediate life in Rome of only about a lustrum [five years].' In turn, the Bolognese biographer Malvasia states that 'only Guido [Reni] was put ahead of everyone else, Guido alone proclaimed and well treated, while [Domenichino], on the contrary, was either not recognized or constantly mistreated in the fees he got, so that he was left without commissions and rejected. Therefore, he was forced to go begging for work, with much effort, through intermediaries, and at any price... the same had been true of the Flagellation of Saint Andrew, which had been painted for a hundred and fifty scudi, whereas in the case of the Adoration of the Cross on the opposite wall four hundred scudi had gone to Guido.'

One of Domenichino's masterpieces, his frescoes of Scenes of the Life of Saint Cecilia in the Polet Chapel of San Luigi dei Francesi, was commissioned in 1612 and completed in 1615. Concurrently he painted his first, and most celebrated, altarpiece, The Last Communion of St. Jerome for the church of San Girolamo della Carità (signed and dated, 1614). It subsequently would be judged as being comparable to Raphael's great Transfiguration and even as "the best picture in the world."

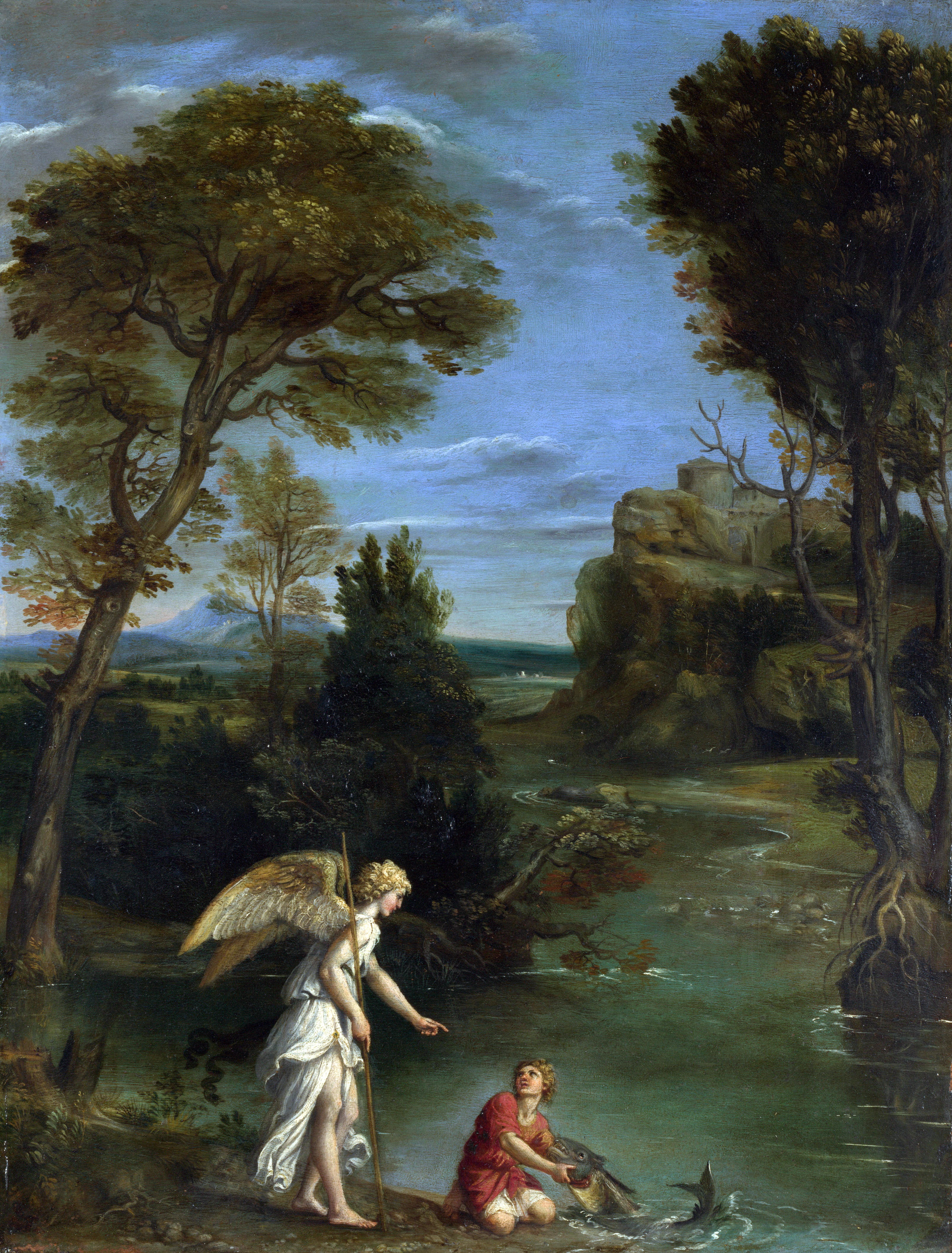
Domenichino – Landscape with Tobias, c. 1610–1613

By late 1616, Domenichino had designed the coffered ceiling with The Assumption of the Virgin in Santa Maria in Trastevere; and he had begun a cycle of ten frescoes depicting the Life of Apollo in a garden pavilion of the Villa Aldobrandini (Belvedere) in Frascati, where he was assisted by Giovanni Battista Viola, a Bolognese artist who, like Domenichino himself, was a pioneer in the development of classicistic landscape painting. From 1617 until 1621, Domenichino was absent from Rome, working in Bologna and at Fano, where during 1618–19 he frescoed the Nolfi chapel of the Fano Cathedral with Scenes from the Life of the Virgin.

With the election of a Bolognese pope (Gregory XV) in 1621, Domenichino returned to Rome. Appointed Papal Architect (he built little but left drawings for various projects, most notably for the façade of Sant'Andrea della Valle and for the plan of Sant'Ignazio, both in Rome), he nonetheless continued to be most active as a painter, obtaining many commissions for altarpieces in Roman churches (San Lorenzo in Miranda, 1626–27, SS. Giovanni Evangelista e Petronio dei Bolognesi, 1626–1629, Santa Maria della Vittoria, 1629–30, and St. Peter's, 1625–1630). He also executed numerous frescoes in Rome during the 1620s: a ceiling in the Palazzo Costaguti (c. 1622); the choir and pendentives in Sant'Andrea della Valle, where he worked in fierce competition with Lanfranco, who painted the dome above Domenichino's pendentives; and the pendentives of San Silvestro al Quirinale (c. 1628) and San Carlo ai Catinari (1628–30).

In spite of his activity in Rome, Domenichino decided to leave the city in 1631 to take up the most prestigious, and very lucrative, commission in Naples, the decoration of the Cappella del Tesoro di San Gennaro of the Naples Cathedral. His Scenes from the Life of San Gennaro occupied him for the rest of his life. He painted four large lunettes, four pendentives, and twelve scenes in the soffits of the arches, all in fresco, plus three large altarpieces in oil on copper. He died, perhaps by poison at the hands of the jealous Cabal of Naples, before completing the fourth altarpiece or the cupola, which was subsequently frescoed by Lanfranco.

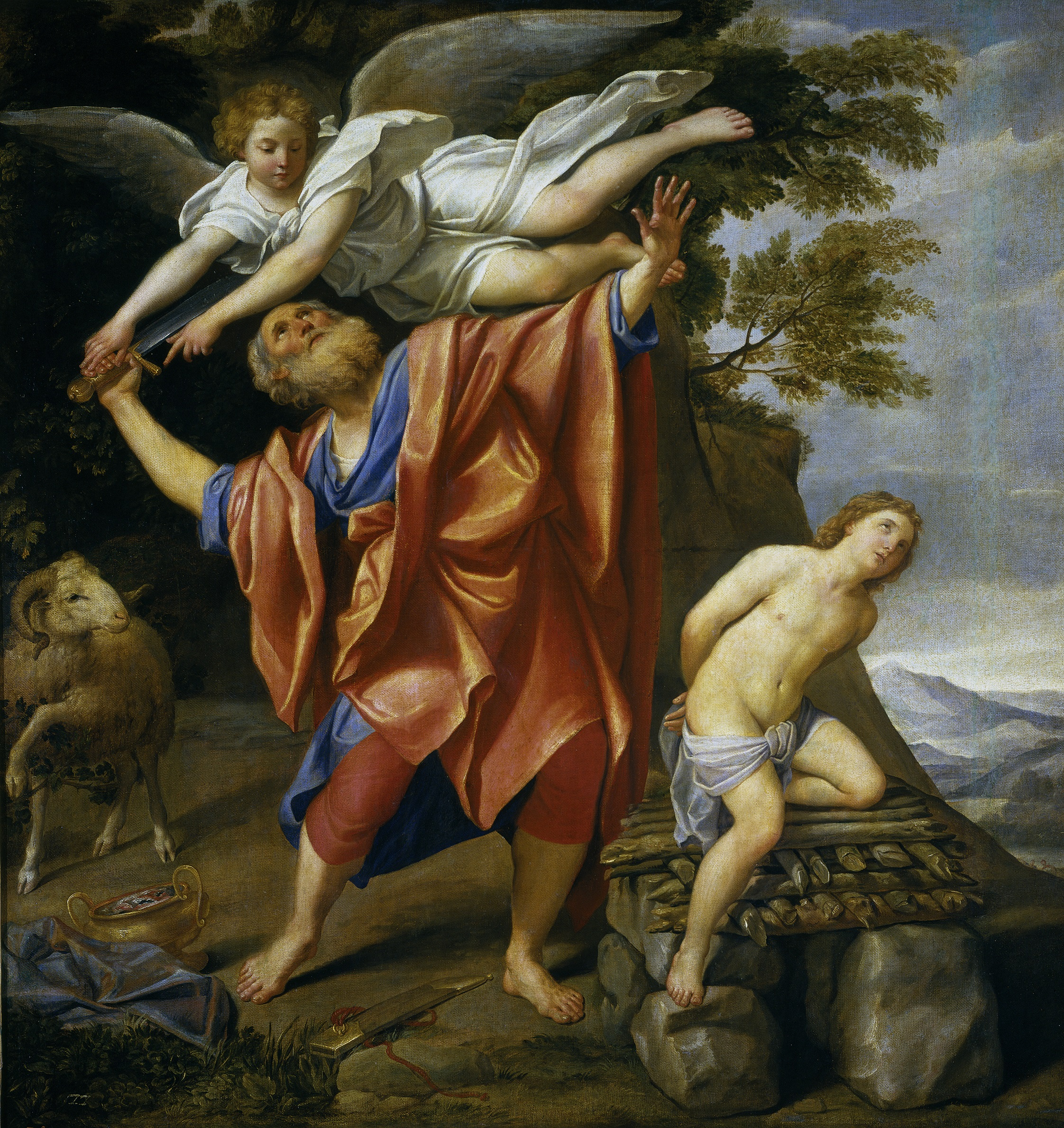
The Sacrifice of Isaac, 1627–28

At the time of his death, Domenichino's chief assistant was an obscure painter from Assisi, Francesco Raspantino, who inherited his master's studio. Earlier, Domenichino's principal pupils were Alessandro Fortuna, Giovanni Battista Ruggieri, Antonio Alberti called Barbalonga, Francesco Cozza, Andrea Camassei, and Giovanni Angelo Canini. Others who studied in his studio include Poussin, Pietro Testa, and his future biographer, Giovanni Pietro Bellori.

== Ideas on art ==
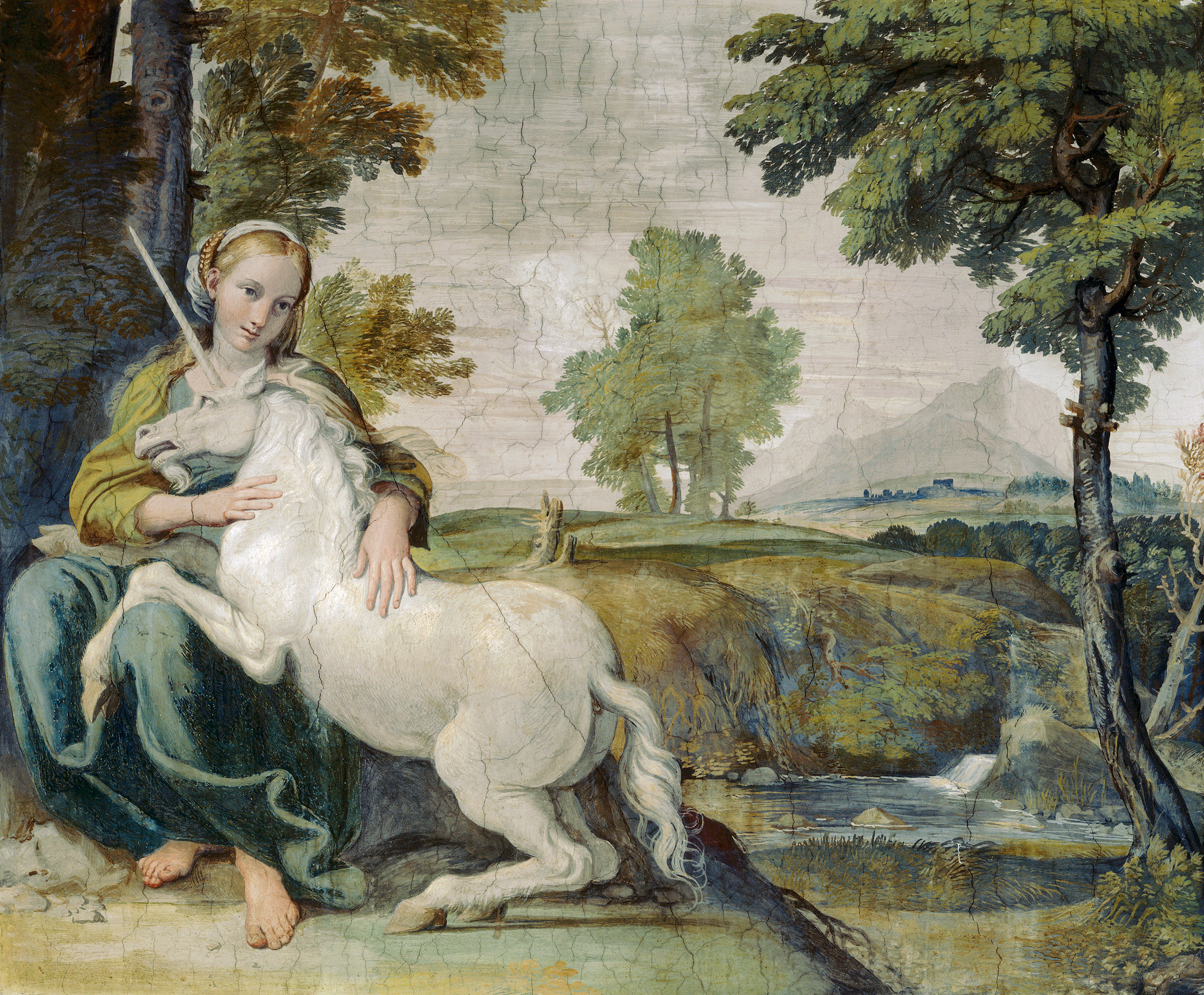
A Virgin with a Unicorn, c. 1604–05, fresco in Palazzo Farnese, Rome, after a design by Annibale Carracci

Domenichino's work, developed principally from Raphael's and the Carracci's examples, mirrors the theoretical ideas of his friend Giovanni Battista Agucchi, with whom the painter collaborated on a Treatise on Painting. The portrait of Agucchi in York used to be attributed to Domenichino, but is now thought to be by Annibale Carracci, another friend.

It represents what would become known as classic-idealist art, which aims to surpass the imperfections of nature by developing an "Idea of Beauty" (idea del bello) through the study and imitation of the best examples of ancient and Renaissance art. Imitation in this sense is not copying but a creative process inspired by rhetorical theory whereby revered models are not only emulated but surpassed. One of the most famous incidents in the history of art that centered on concepts of Imitation arose when Lanfranco accused Domenichino of plagiarism, specifically of having stolen the design of his great Last Communion of St. Jerome from an altarpiece of the same subject in Bologna by his former teacher, Agostino Carracci. To prove his point, Lanfranco circulated a print after Agostino's painting, prompting painters and critics to take sides, most of whom—including Poussin and the antiquarian-critic-biographer Bellori—strongly defended Domenichino's work as being praiseworthy imitation.

In addition to his interest in the theory of painting (he was well educated and bookish), Domenichino was devoted to music, not as a performer but to the invention of instruments suited to the stile moderno or to what Monteverdi dubbed the "seconda pratica." Like Domenichino's paintings, its sources were in ancient models and aimed at clarity of expression capable of moving its audience. As the Florentine composer Giulio Caccini held and Domenichino surely believed, the aim of the composer/artist was to "move the passion of the mind." To achieve that goal, Domenichino paid particular attention to expressive gestures. Some 1750 drawings in the Royal Collection at Windsor Castle attest to the assiduous study underlying Domenichino's work—figural, architectural, decorative, landscape, even caricature—and to the painter's brilliance as a draftsman. In Roger de Piles' Balance of 1708, an effort to quantify and compare the greatness of painters in four categories (no artist ever achieved a score above 18 in any category), the French critic awarded Domenichino 17 points for drawing (dessein), 17 for expression, 15 for composition, yet only 9 as a colorist. Domenichino's composite score of 58 nonetheless was surpassed only by Raphael and Rubens, and it equalled that of the Carracci.

=== Criticism from Ruskin ===
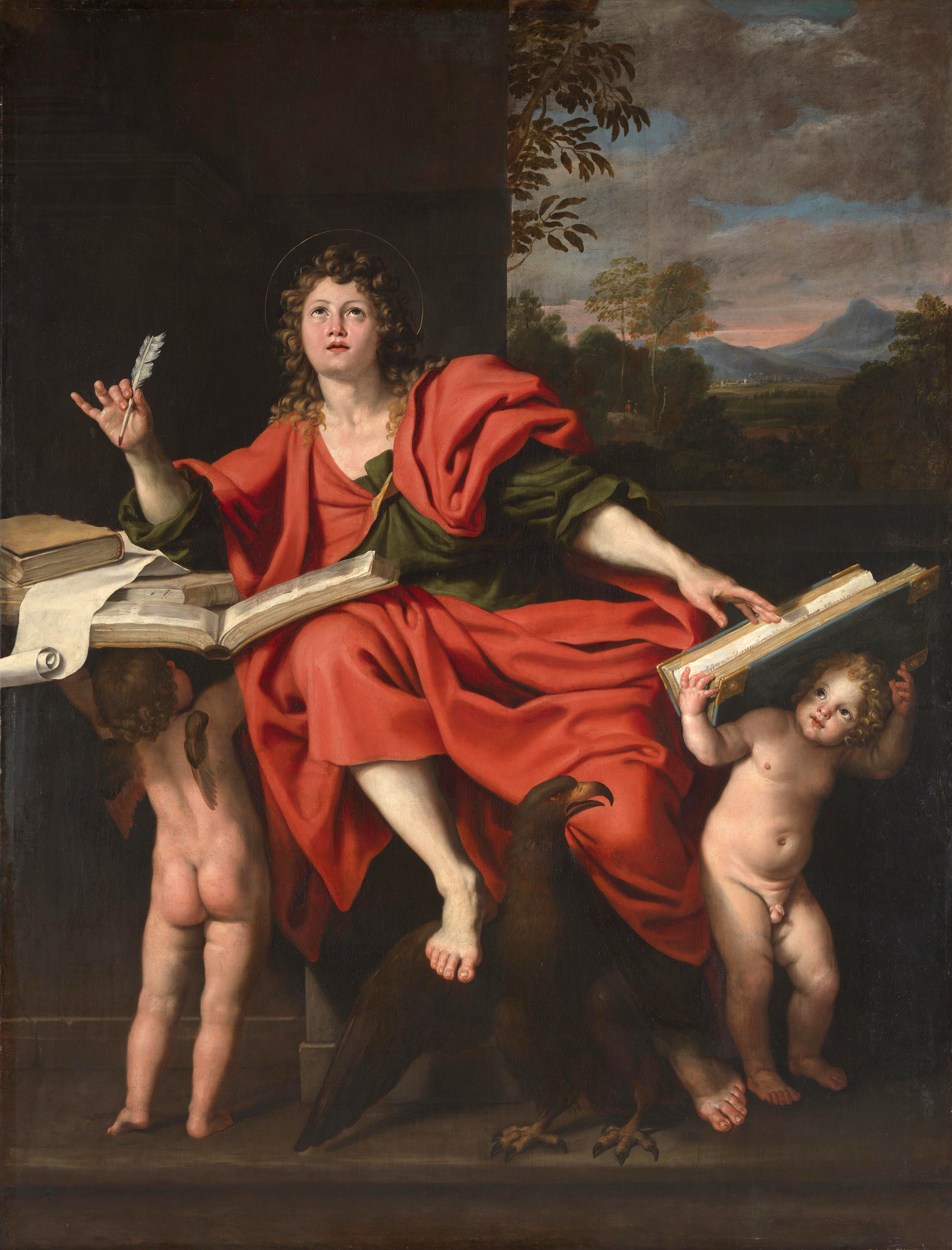
St John the Evangelist (c. 1621–1629)

The Balance reflects Domenichino's high standing in the history of European taste— until John Ruskin in the 1840s wrote his devastating attacks on Bolognese Baroque painting in his Modern Painters. The Carracci and their followers were condemned by Ruskin as being "insincere". For Ruskin, there was no entirely sincere nor any great art from the seventeenth century and all was doubly damned as being "eclectic." Modern scholarship, led by Luigi Serra, John Pope-Hennessy, Evelina Borea and Richard Spear, who in 1982 published the first catalogue raisonné of all of Domenichino's paintings and preparatory drawings, has resurrected the artist from the Victorian graveyard and reestablished his place among the most important and influential painters of seventeenth-century Italy. In 1996 the first major exhibition of his work was held at the Palazzo Venezia in Rome.

== Selected works ==
- Saint John the Evangelist, 1621–1629 (auctioned in London in December 2009 for more than £9.2 million, acquired by another buyer on condition that it be put on public display for three months every year).
- The Virgin, Infant Jesus, and John the Baptist (The Madonna of Silence), c. 1605, Louvre Museum
- A Virgin with a Unicorn, c. 1604–05, Farnese Gallery, Palazzo Farnese, Rome; fresco based on a design by Annibale Carracci
- Abraham Leading Isaac to Sacrifice, 1602, Kimbell Art Museum, Ft. Worth
- Landscape with Baptism of Christ (in collaboration with G. B. Viola?), c. 1603, Kunsthaus, Zurich
- Landscape with Flight into Egypt, c. 1605–06, Allen Memorial Art Museum, Oberlin College
- Portrait of Cardinal Girolamo Agucchi, c. 1604–05, Uffizi, Florence
- Landscape with fishermen, hunters and washerwomen, c. 1604–05, Ackland Art Museum, Chapel Hill
- Landscape with Fording], c. 1604–05, Galleria Doria Pamphilj, Rome
- Adoration of the Shepherds c. 1607–1610
- Flagellation of St. Andrew, 1609, San Gregorio Magno, Rome
- The Ascension of St. Paul, c. 1606–1608, Louvre
- Scenes from the Life of Diana, 1609, Palazzo Giustiniani, now Odescalchi, Bassano di Sutri (Rome)
- The 'Consecratio' of a Roman Emperor, 1634–1636, Prado Museum, Madrid
- Landscape with Fortifications, c. 1634–35, Denis Mahon Collection, London
- Cumaean Sibyl, c. 1610, Pinacoteca Capitolina, Rome
- Legends of SS. Nilus and Bartholomew, 1608–1610, Abbey of Grottaferrata
- A Triumphal Arch, c. 1609, Prado Museum, Madrid
- Way to Calvary, c. 1610, J. Paul Getty Museum, Los Angeles
- Last Communion of Saint Jerome, 1614, Vatican Pinacoteca and
- Scenes of the Life of Saint Cecilia, 1612–1615, frescoes, San Luigi dei Francesi, Rome
- Landscape with Saint Jerome, c. 1610, Glasgow Art Gallery and Museum
- Landscape with Sylvia and Satyrs, c. 1615–1620, Pinacoteca Nazionale di Bologna
- Alexander and Timoclea, c. 1615, Louvre Museum
- Truth Disclosed by Time (in collaboration with Agostino Tassi), c. 1622, fresco Palazzo Costaguti, Rome)
- Cumaean Sibyl, 1616–17, Galleria Borghese, Rome
- Madonna of the Rosary, 1617–1622/25 (Pinacoteca Nazionale di Bologna)
- Archery Contest of Diana and her Nymphs, c. 1616–17, Galleria Borghese, Rome
- The Virgin and Child with Saints John the Baptist and Petronius, 1626–1629, Pinacoteca di Brera, Milan (on deposit at the Galleria Nazionale d'Arte Antica, Rome)
- Saint Agnes, c. 1620, Royal Collection, Hampton Court
- Madonna of Loreto with Saints John the Baptist, Paterniano, and Anthony Abbot, c. 1618–19, North Carolina Museum of Art)
- Rinaldo and Armida, c. 1620–21, Louvre, Paris
- Martyrdom of St Peter Martyr (after Titian), c. 1619–1621, Pinacoteca Nazionale di Bologna
- Life of Apollo, 1616–18, frescoes, Stanza di Apollo, Villa Aldobrandini (Belvedere), Frascati (now mostly in the National Gallery, London)
- The Four Evangelists and Scenes from the Life of St. Andrew, 1622–1627, frescoes in the pendentives and choir of Sant'Andrea della Valle, Rome MatthewMark Luke
- Landscape with Hercules and Acheloüs, c. 1622–23, Louvre, Paris
- Saint Ignatius de Loyola's Vision of Christ and God the Father, c. 1622, Los Angeles County Museum of Art
- Landscape with The Flight to Egypt, c. 1623, Louvre, Paris
- Landscape with Child overturning Wine, c. 1603–1605, Louvre, Paris
- Rebuke of Adam and Eve, c, 1623–1625, Musée des Beax-Arts, Grenoble
- An Allegory of Agriculture, Astronomy and Architecture, c. 1624–25, Galleria Sabauda, Turin
- ''Rebuke of Adam and Eve'', 1626, National Gallery Art, Washington D.C.
- Martyrdom of St. Agnes, c. 1619–22/25, Pinacoteca Nazionale di Bologna
- Death of Adonis, Apollo and Hyacinthus and Narcissus, frescoes, 1603–04, Palazzo Farnese, Rome
- Martyrdom of St Sebastian, 1625–1630, St. Peter's, Rome (now Santa Maria degli Angeli, Rome)
- Assumption of the Virgin, 1616–17, Santa Maria di Trastevere, Rome
- Landscape with Erminia and the Shepherds, c. 1623–1625?, Louvre, Paris
- Landscape with Hercules and Cacus, c. 1622–23, Louvre, Paris
- Saint Cecilia with an Angel, c. 1617–18, Louvre, Paris
- Sacrifice of Isaac, c. 1627–28, Prado Museum, Madrid
- Scenes from the Life of San Gennaro, 1631–1641, frescoes, Cappella del Tesoro di San Gennaro, Cathedral of Naples
- Landscape with Tobias laying hold of the Fish, c. 1610–1612, National Gallery, London
- Mary Magdalene in Glory, c. 1620, Hermitage, St. Petersburg
- Sibyl, XVII c., M. Žilinskas Art Gallery, Kaunas, Lithuania
- The Appearance of the Angels to St. Jerome, Prado Museum, Madrid.
- The Head of the Baptist, Real Academia de Bellas Artes de San Fernando, Madrid.
- St. John the Evangelist, c.1625-1628, Museum & Gallery, Inc. in Greenville, SC.

== Works ==
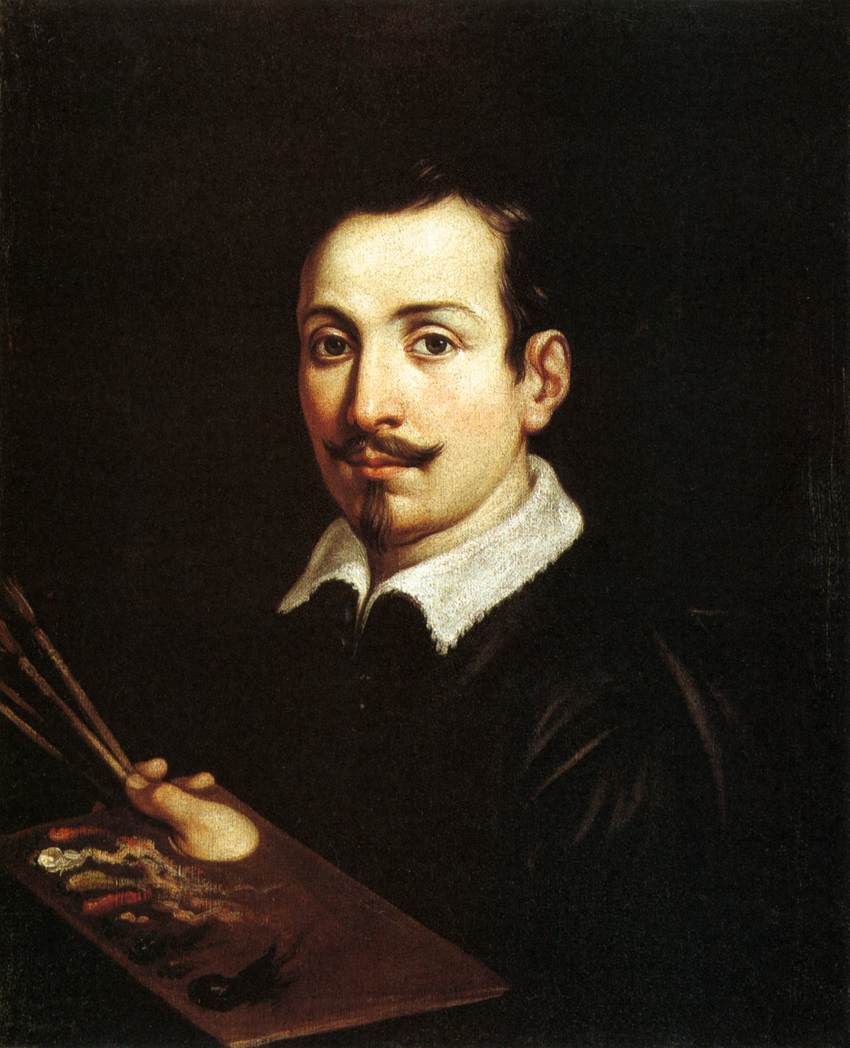
Portrait of Guido Reni, 1603–04

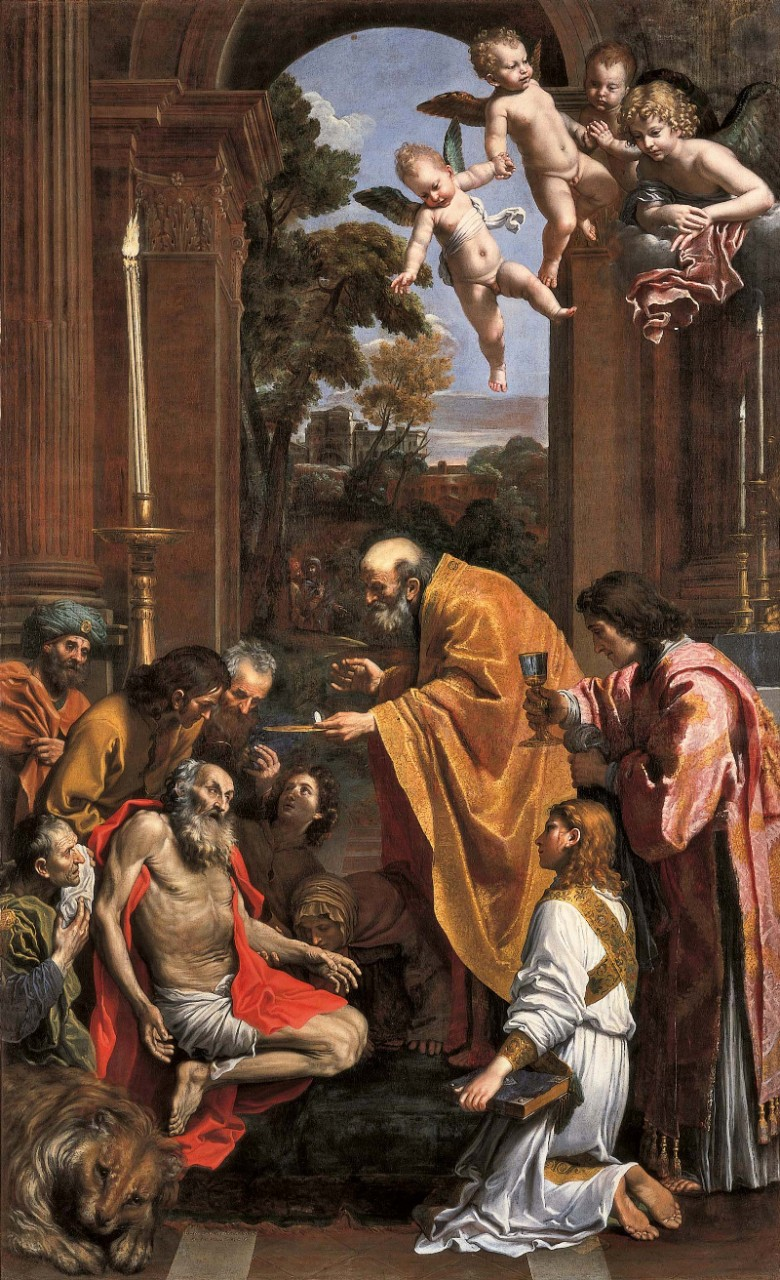
Last Communion of St. Jerome, 1614, Pinacoteca Vaticana

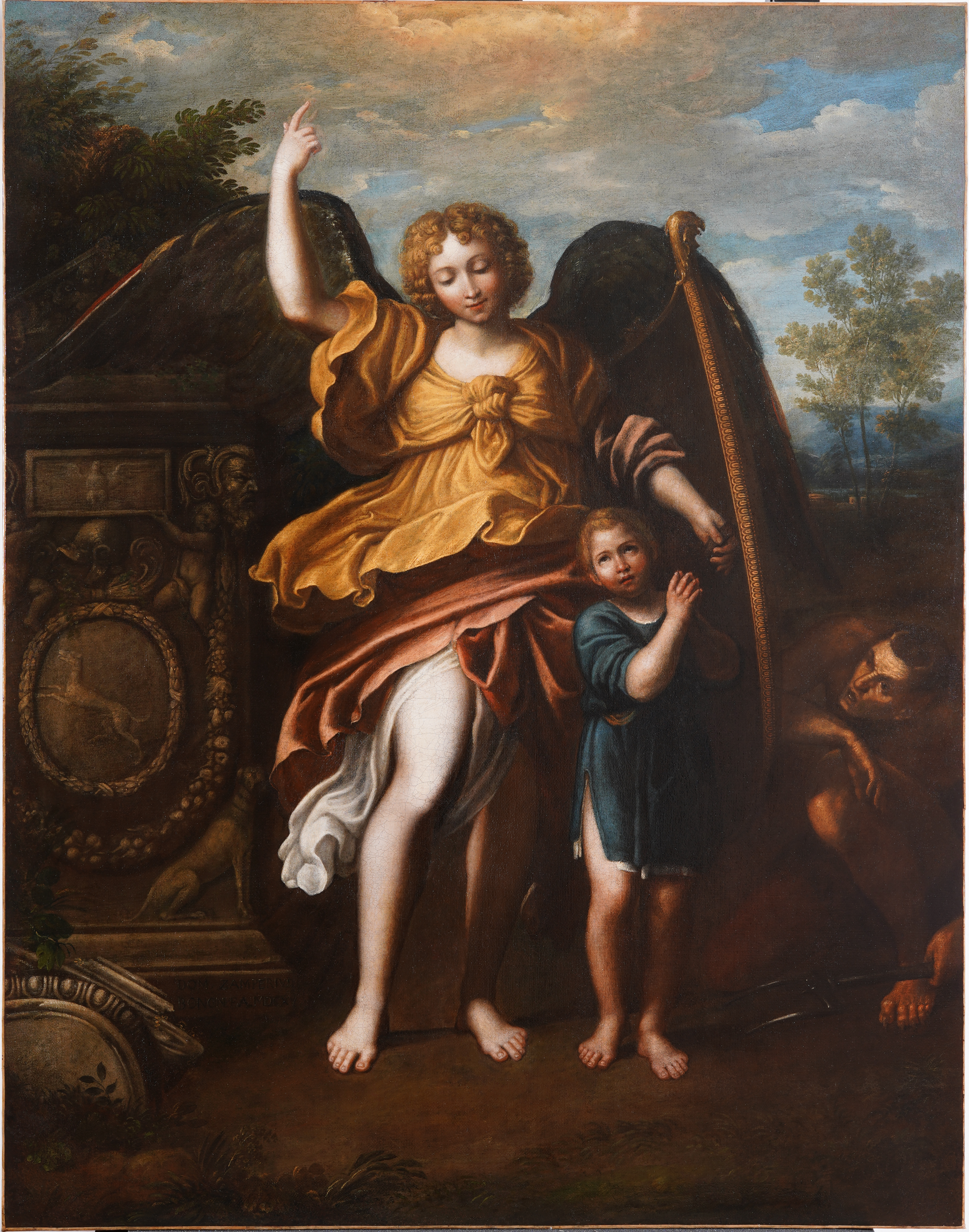
Guardian angel signed Domenico Zampieri called Doenichino dated 1615 after cleaning

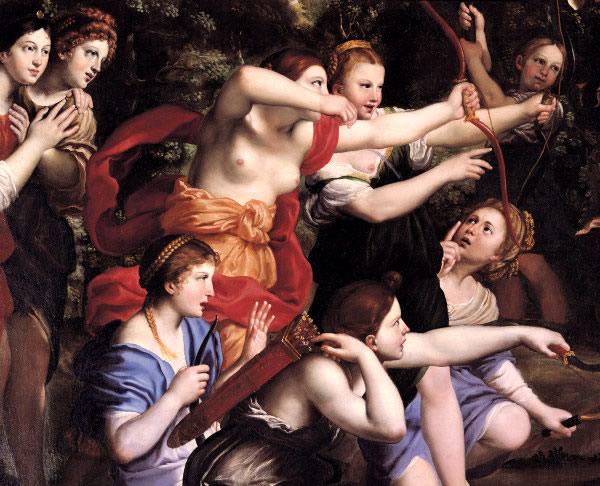
Detail from Diana and her Nymphs, 1616–17

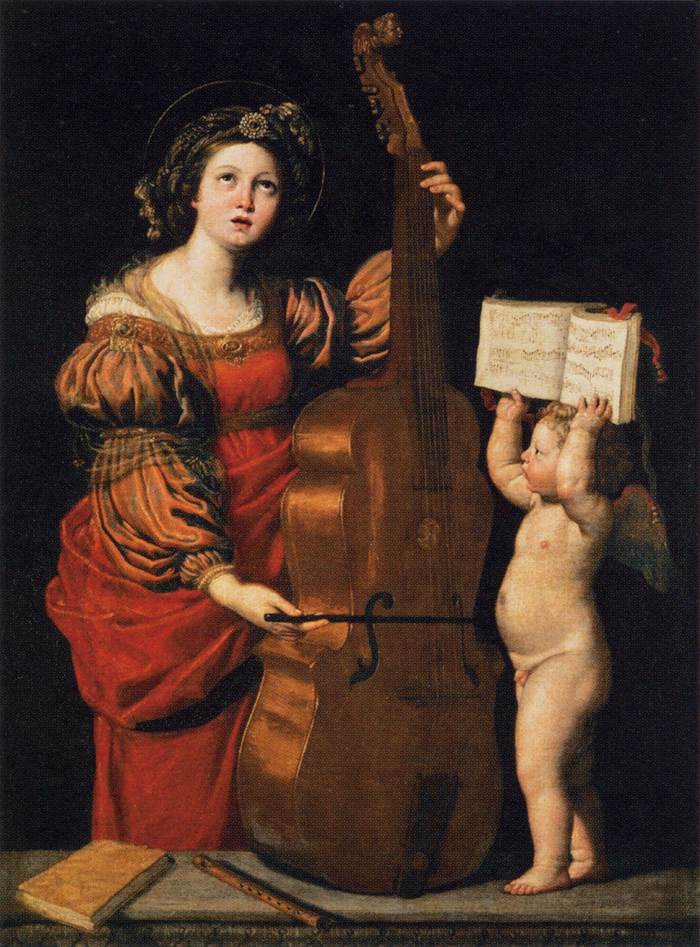
Saint Cecilia Playing the Viol, 1618

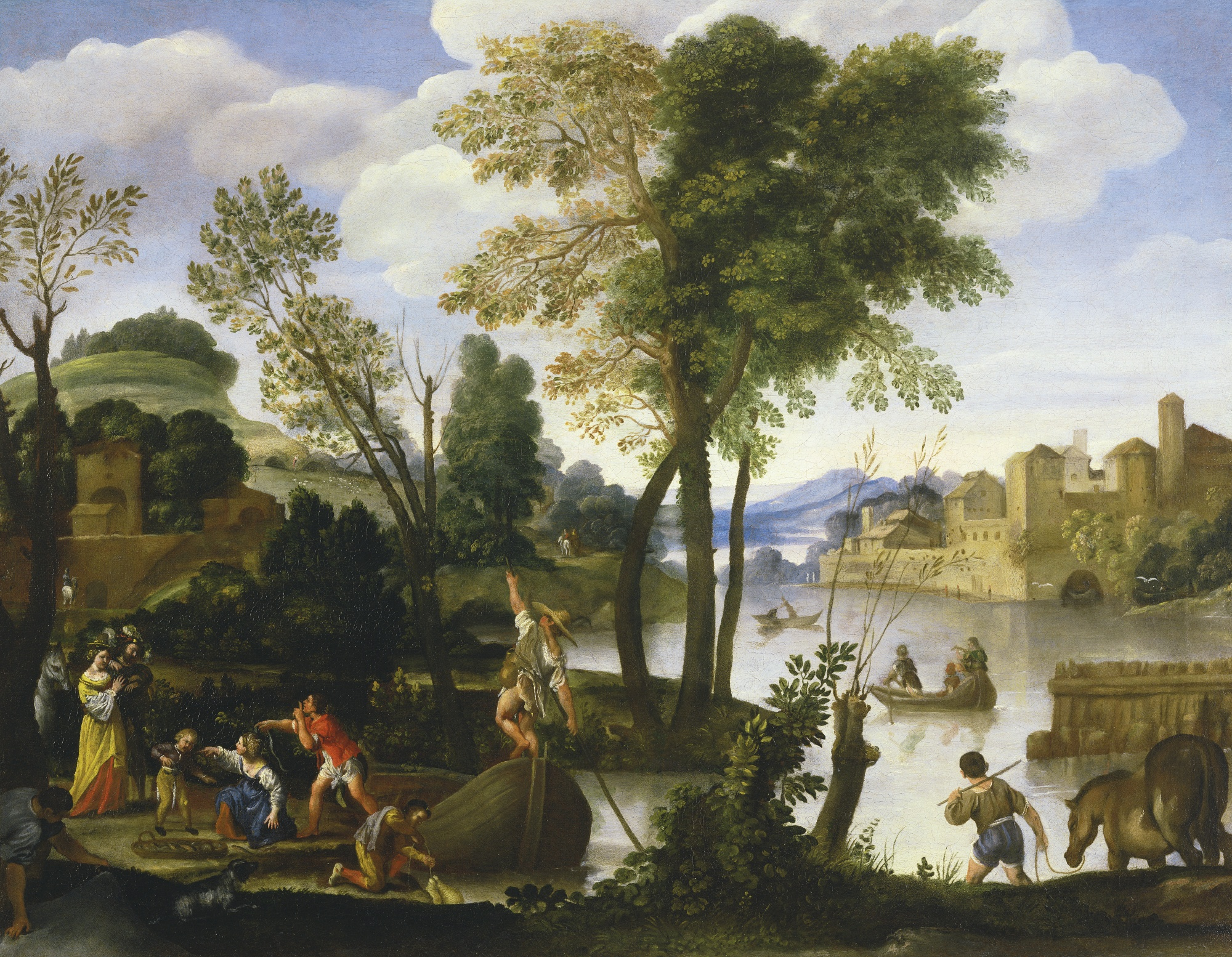
River landscape with Boatmen and Fisherman, an elegant couple walking by the shore

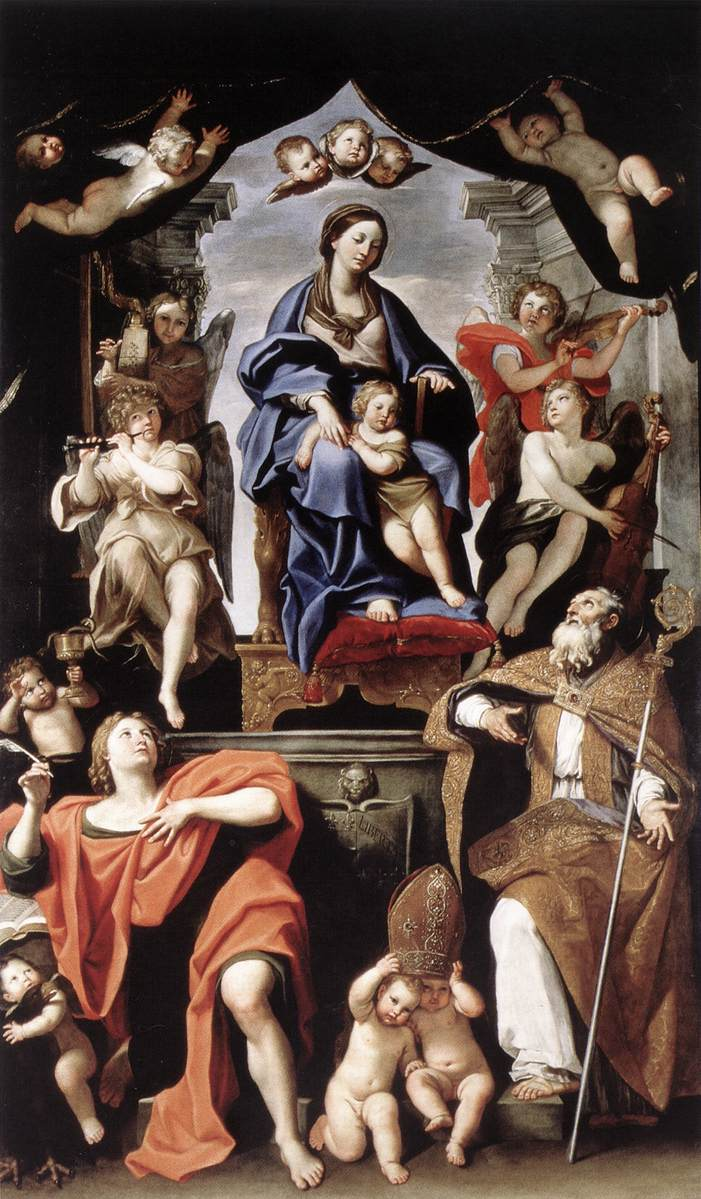
Madonna and Child with St Petronius and St John the Evangelist

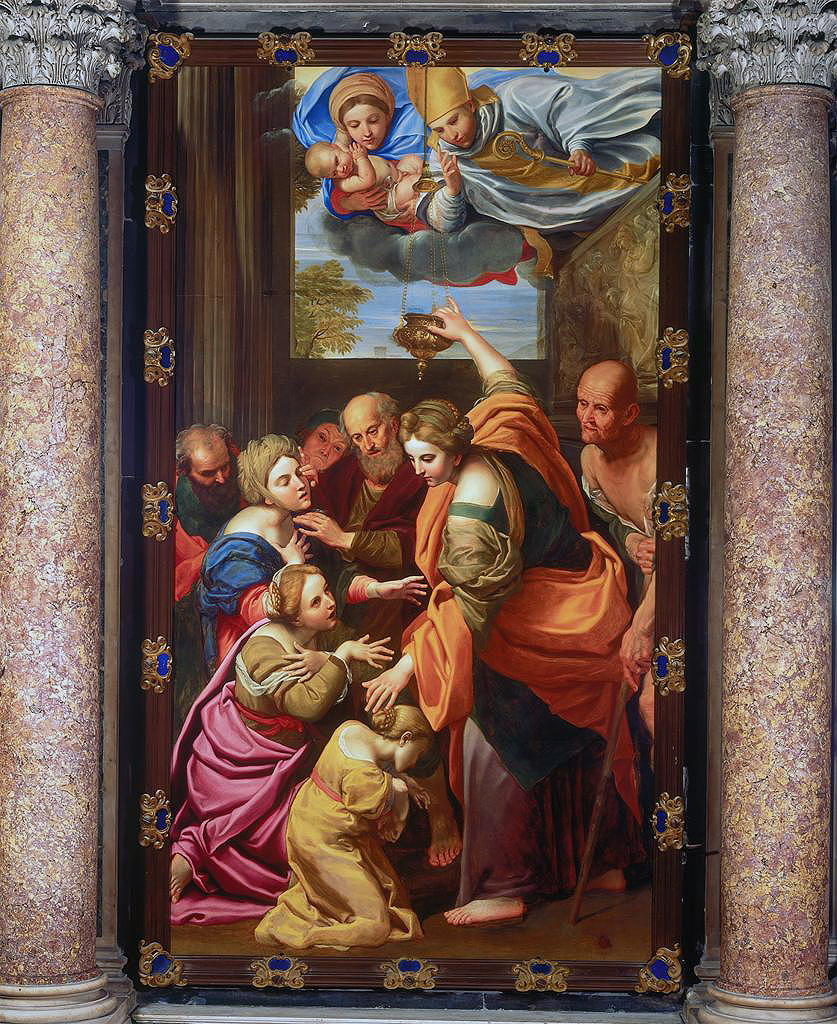
Apparition of the Virgin and Child and San Gennaro at the Miraculous Oil Lamp, 1637–38, Cathedral of Naples

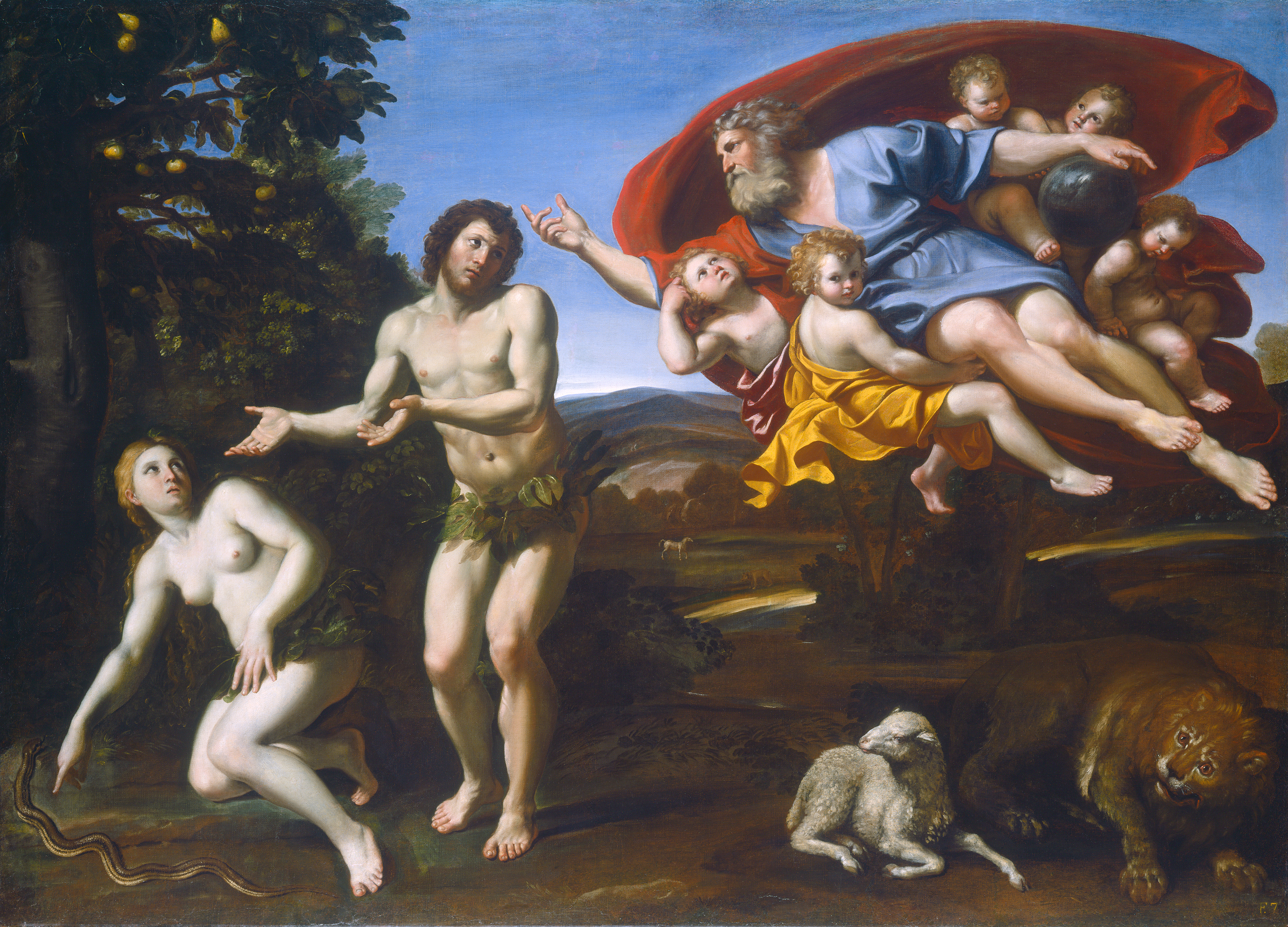
The Rebuke of Adam and Eve, 1626, National Gallery of Art

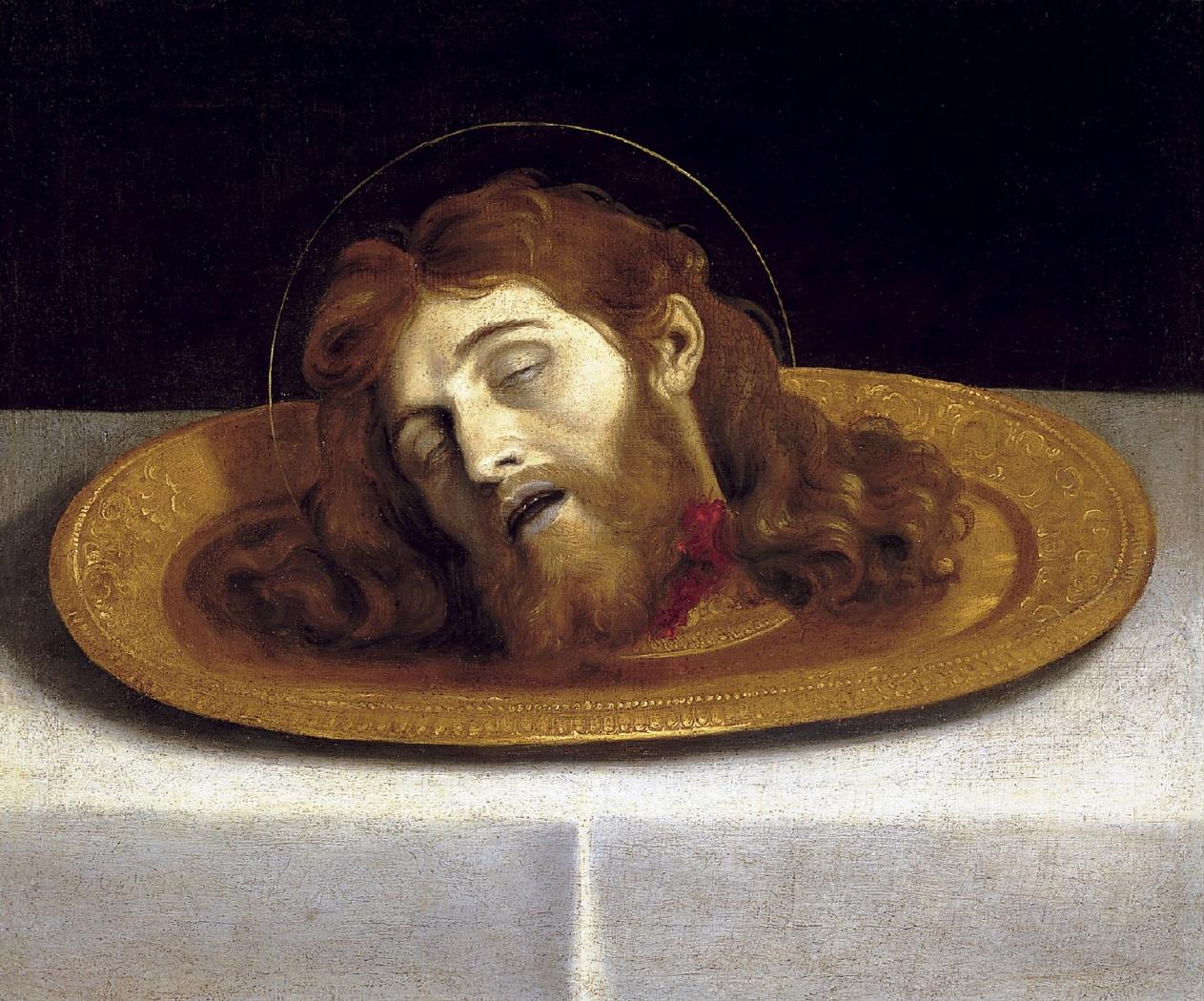
The head of the Baptist. Real Academia de Bellas Artes de San Fernando, Madrid.

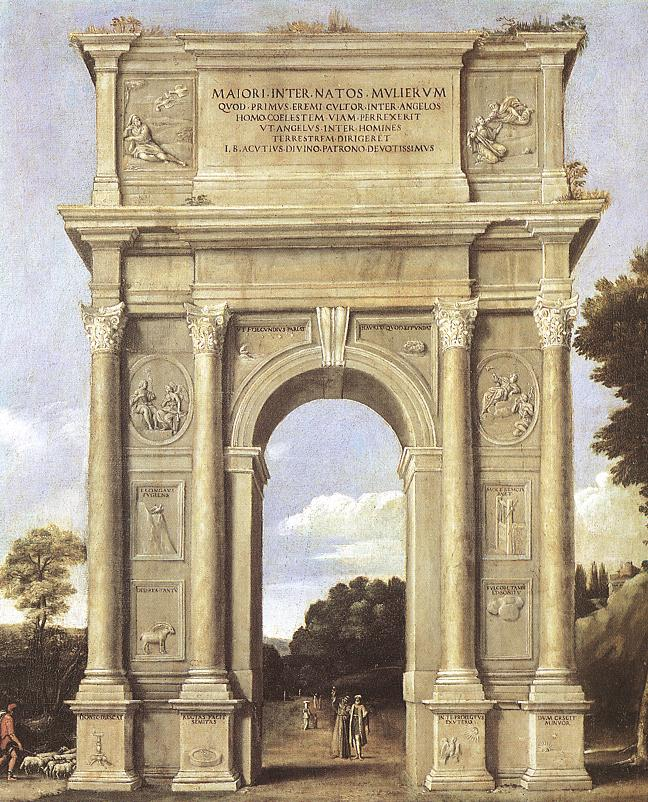
A Triumphal Arch, Prado Museum, Madrid.

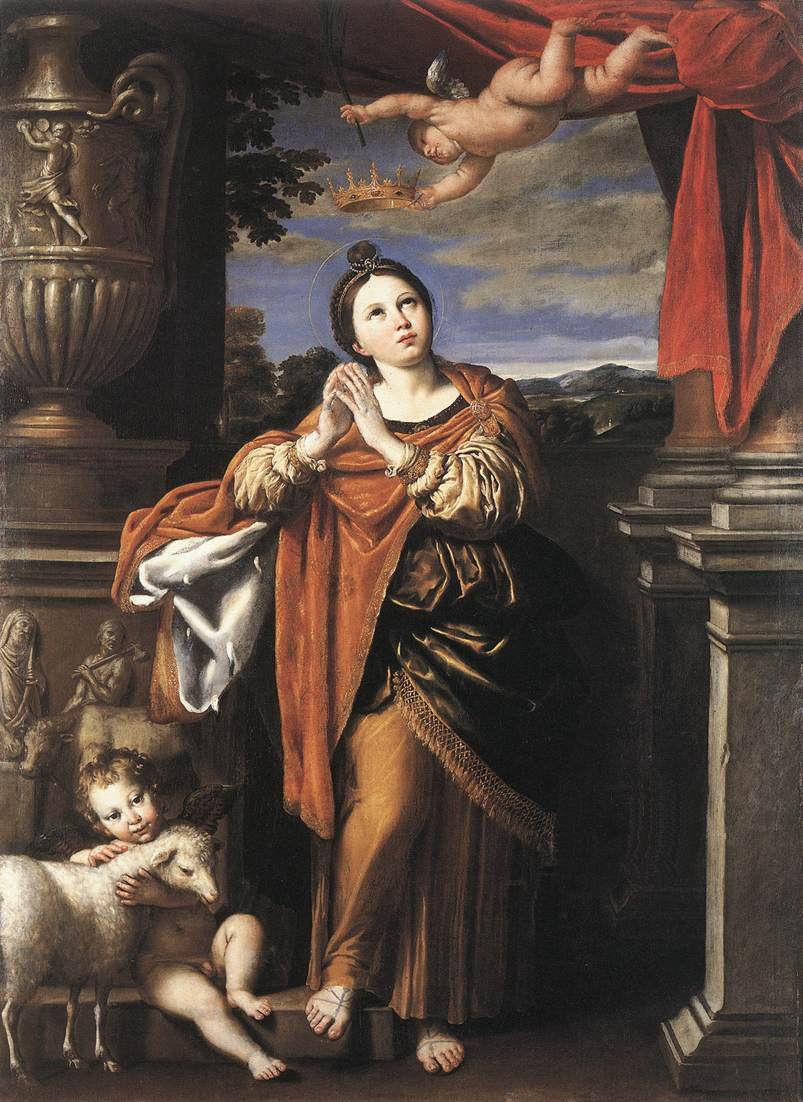
Agnes of Rome with angels and a lamb
