= A Virgin with a Unicorn =

Painting by Domenichino

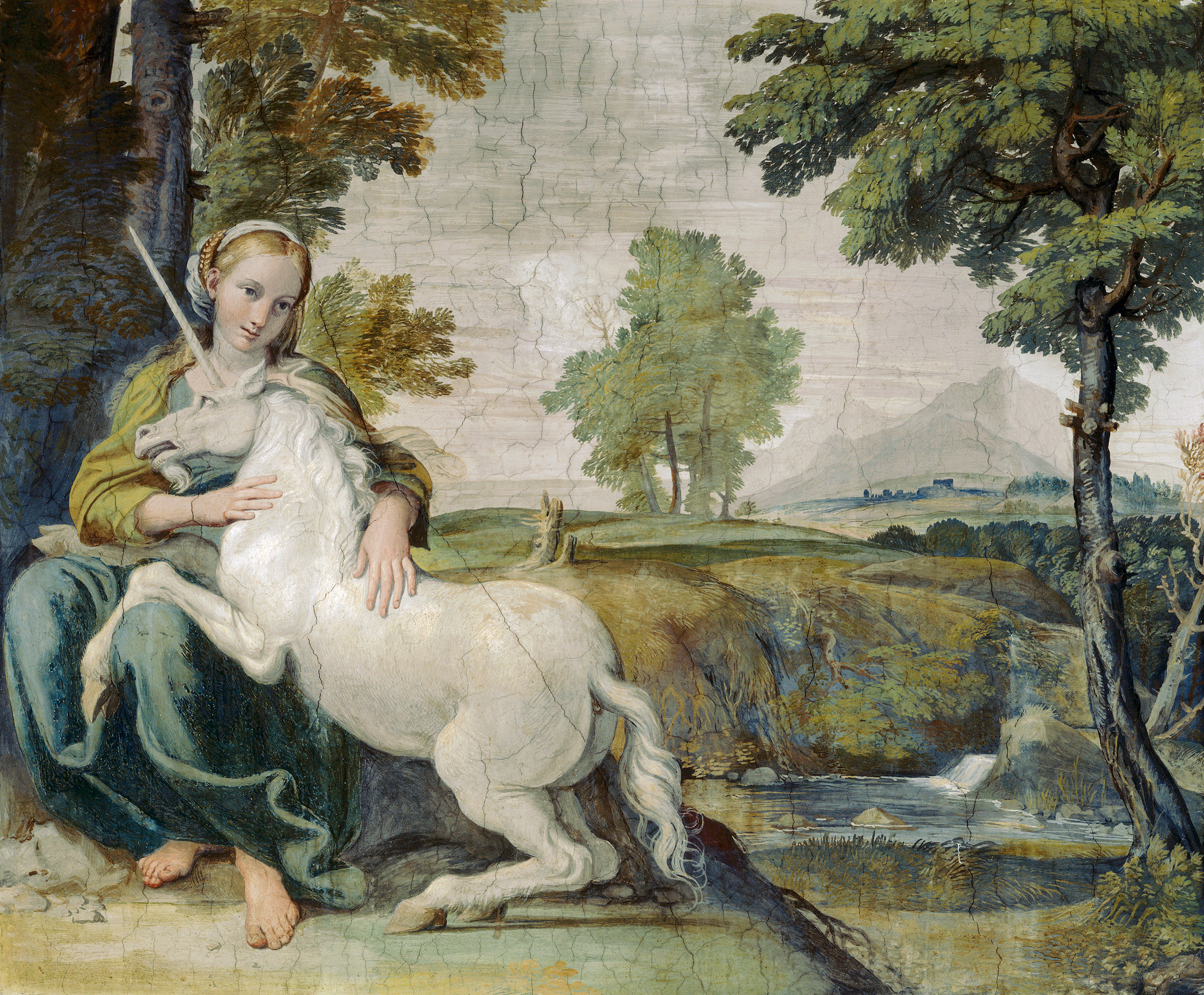
- Artist: Domenichino
- Year: c. 1604–05
- Type: Fresco
- Location: Palazzo Farnese, Rome

A Virgin with a Unicorn (Fanciulla e l'unicorno) is a fresco painting by the Italian Baroque artist Domenichino, completed between c. 1604 and 1605. It is in the collection of the Palazzo Farnese, in Rome.

== Description ==
A Virgin with a Unicorn was created for the decoration for Galleria Farnese under the direction of Annibale Carracci, who died a few years later after the piece was finished. The fresco was painted over the entrance and above the southeast wall of Galleria Farnese, an art gallery of Carracci, constituting one of his vault and ceiling frescos. It is the undisputed work of his student Domenichino, but it may be doubtful whether it was his sole effort.

The painting is an allegory of chastity between the virgin and the unicorn. It shows the unicorn being tamed in the lap of the virgin. The unicorn may not always symbolise virginity, and in this case is likely allegorical. The artist highlights the shyness of both subjects, as the scene is set at the edge of the woods instead of the center of the landscape. The gentle atmosphere of the piece is in contrast to Carracci's bloody scenery of his Galleria Farnese.

The painting has been connected to the controversy concerning Pope Alexander VI and his mistress Giulia Farnese, who died about eighty years before the painting was executed, and allegedly is an allegory of the relationship between the two.
