= Democritus (Agostino Carracci) =

Painting by Agostino Carracci

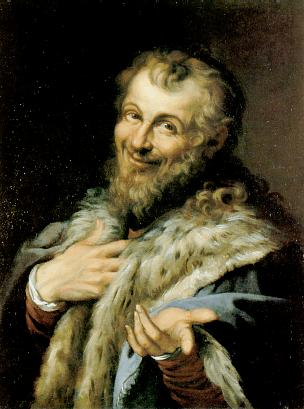
- Artist: Agostino Carracci
- Year: c. 1596
- Medium: oil on canvas
- Dimensions: 88.5 cm × 66 cm (34.8 in × 26 in)
- Location: Museo di Capodimonte, Naples

Democritus is an oil on canvas painting by the Italian painter Agostino Carracci, from c. 1596. It depicts the ancient Greek philosopher Democritus. It is held in the Museo di Capodimonte, in Naples.

== Description ==
Democritus was a usual subject for paintings of Ancient Greece philosophers in the 16th and 17th centuries. This depiction shows his humouristic view of human nature. He appears in the painting smiling and pointing to the viewer, while wearing fancy clothing, including a pelt made of lynx's fur, in accordance with his beliefs in the false superiority of man over animals. At the same time he also points to himself like showing that he also shares the same condition as the viewer. Agostino reputation as the most cultivated of the Carracci, with great knowledge on geography, biology and philosophy, seems to be demonstrated by this portrait. He possibly knew Democritus from the work of Plutarch, the Moralia. This painting is believed to have been made when Agostino was collaborating with his brother Annibale in the decoration of the Palazzo Farnese, in Rome.

== Reception ==
Ronald Huebert and David McNeil state that the painting "displays an impish humour, notably expressed by the philosopher's hands."
