= Cumaean Sibyl (Domenichino) =

Painting by Domenichino

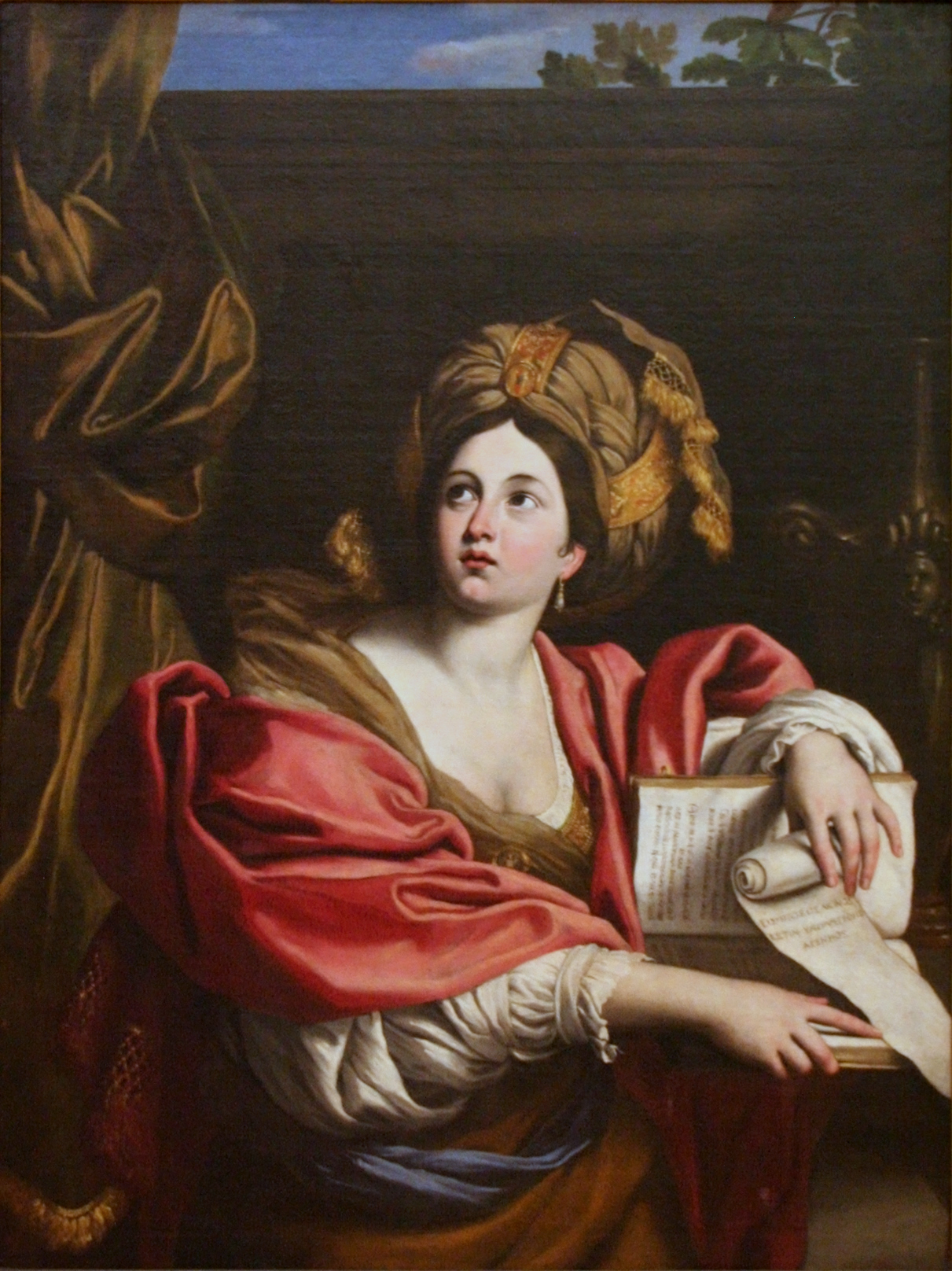
- Artist: Domenicho Zampieri (Domenichino)
- Year: 1622
- Medium: Oil on canvas
- Dimensions: 138 cm × 103 cm (54 in × 41 in)
- Location: Sala Petronilla, Musei Capitolini, Rome

The Cumaean Sibyl (Sibilla Cumana) is an oil painting on canvas by the Italian Baroque painter Domenicho Zampieri (Domenichino) housed in the Capitoline Museum in Rome, Italy.

== Description ==
The painting appears to be one of four paintings of nearly the same subject by Domenichino, including also works at the Galleria Borghese, a Persian Sibyl at the Wallace Collection in London, a painting in a private Scottish collection and one in a private Bermuda collection.

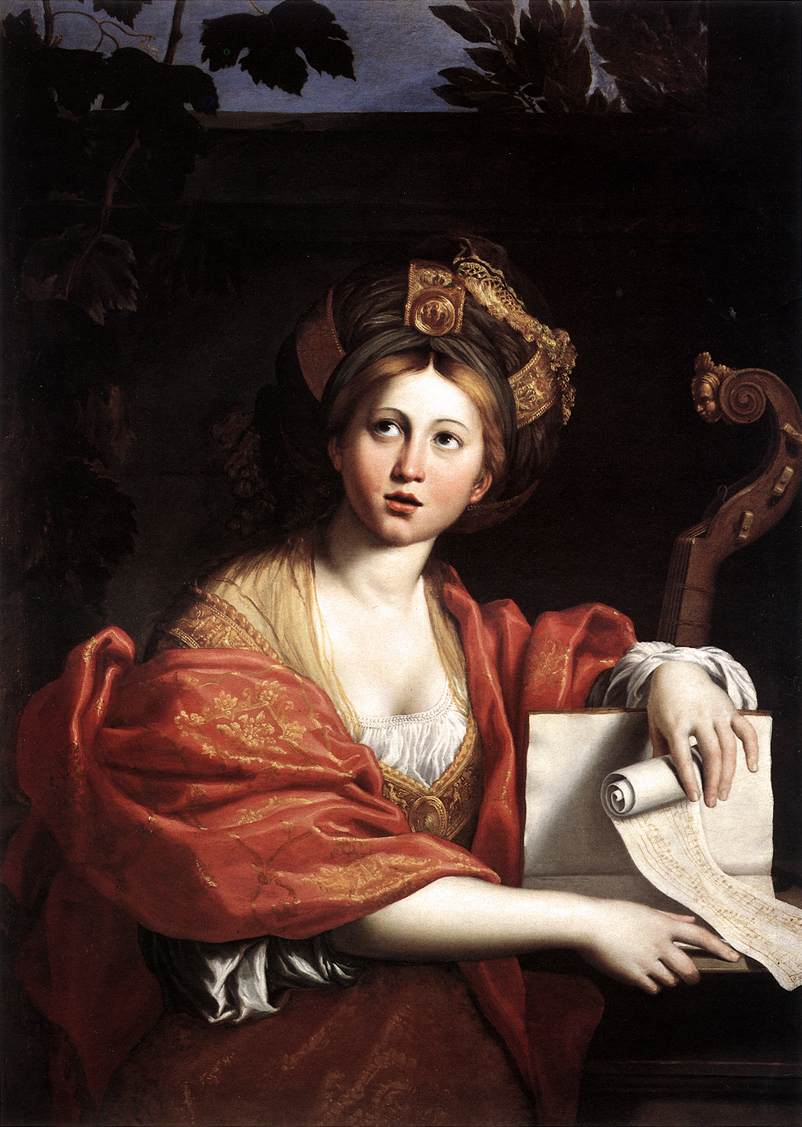
Cumaean Sibyl at Galleria Borghese, also by Domenichino

The theme of the Cumaean Sibyl was used by the Bolognese Domenichino likely four times and was a common trope favored by learned patrons in Rome. Patrons could obtain a topic both derived from classical literature and yet voicing an apparent prophesy of the birth of Christ. She is featured Michelangelo's frescoes in the Sistine Chapel frescoes and Raphael's frescoes in Santa Maria della Pace. These painters depicted the Sibyl as an older woman; tradition holds that she had a God give her a long life, but was not given extended youth.

The writing by the Sibyl in Greek on the scroll reads, "There is one God infinite and unborn"; the word unborn is spelled incorrectly. The painting is mentioned in the inventory from 1641, and the list of 1697, assigns the work to Domenichino. The work has undergone a number of restorations.
