= Democrates =

Pythagorean philosopher

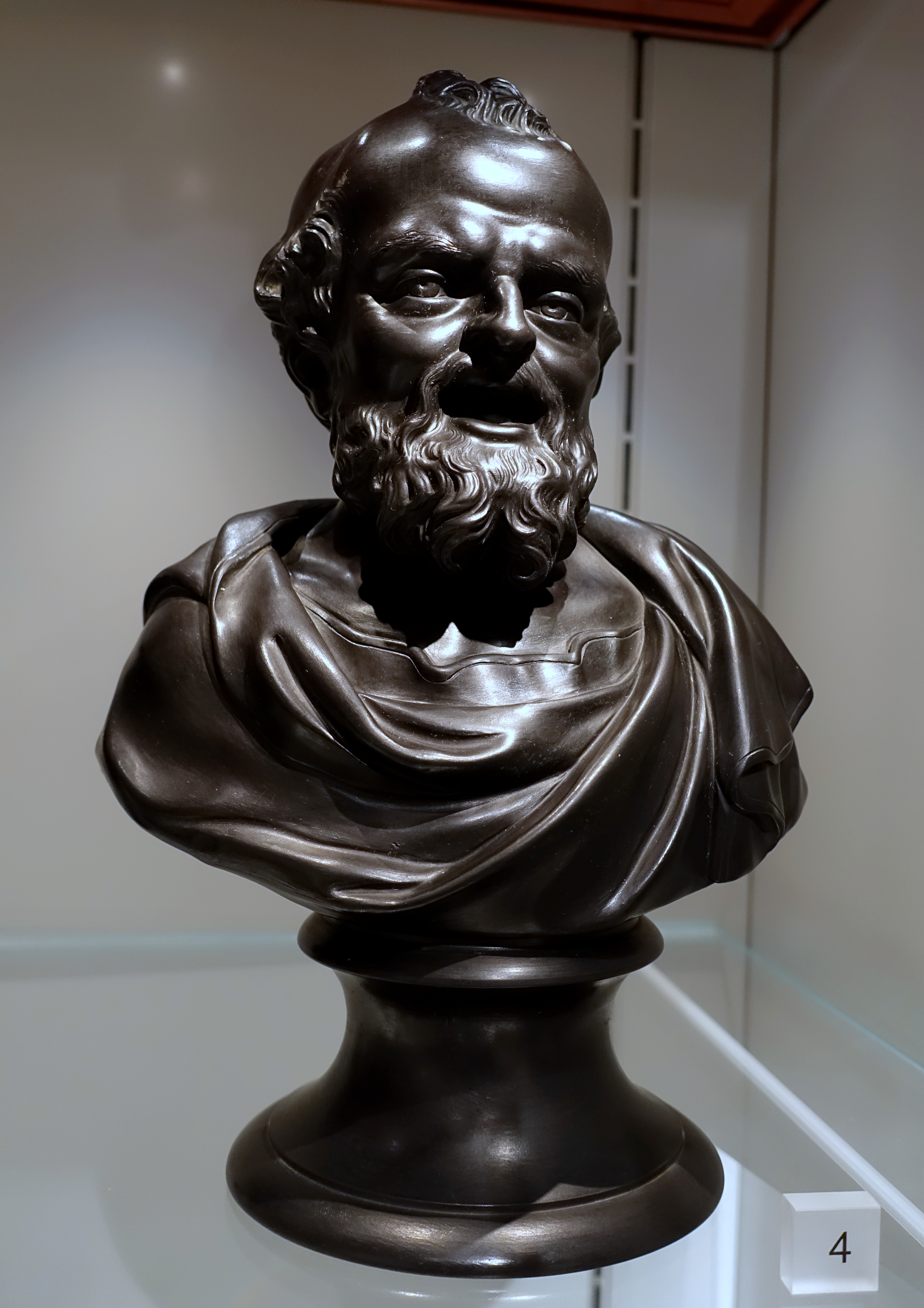
Democrates, from a model supplied by Hoskins and Grant, 1777–1780, by Josiah Wedgwood

Democrates (/dɪˈmɒkrəˌtiːz/; Ancient Greek: Δημοκράτης) was a Pythagorean philosopher about whom little is known. Apollonius of Tyana authored at least one letter, his epistle no. 96, to a Democrates, but it is unclear whether this philosopher were the addressee.

A collection of moral maxims called the Golden Sentences (γνῶμαι χρυσαῖ, Gnomai chrysai) has come down to us under his name. However, many scholars argue that these maxims all originate from an original collection of sayings of Democritus and brand Democrates a misnomer, though others believe that there was a little-known Democrates whose name became confused with Democritus. Thirty of the Golden Sayings are also found in Stobaeus, there as in other sources attributed to Democritus, but some scholars think some of these unsuited to the better-known philosopher's style; at least scholar divides them, part going to a Democrates, whom he identifies with Democrates of Aphidna, and part to Democritus.

The maxims are written in the Ionic dialect, from which some scholars have inferred that they were written at a very early period. Others think it more probable that they are the production of the age of Julius Caesar. But nothing can be said with certainty, for want of both external and internal evidence.
