= Damocrates =

1st century AD Greek physician

Servilius Damocrates (or Democrates; Greek: Δαμοκράτης, Δημοκράτης) was a Greek physician at Rome in the middle to late 1st century AD. He may have received the praenomen "Servillius" from his having become a client of the Servilia gens. Galen calls him ἄριστος ἰατρός, and Pliny says he was "e primis medentium," and relates his cure of Considia, the daughter of Marcus Servilius. He wrote quite a few pharmaceutical works in Greek iambic verse, of which there only remain the titles and some extracts preserved by Galen.
