= Palazzo Farnese =

Palazzo in Rome, Italy

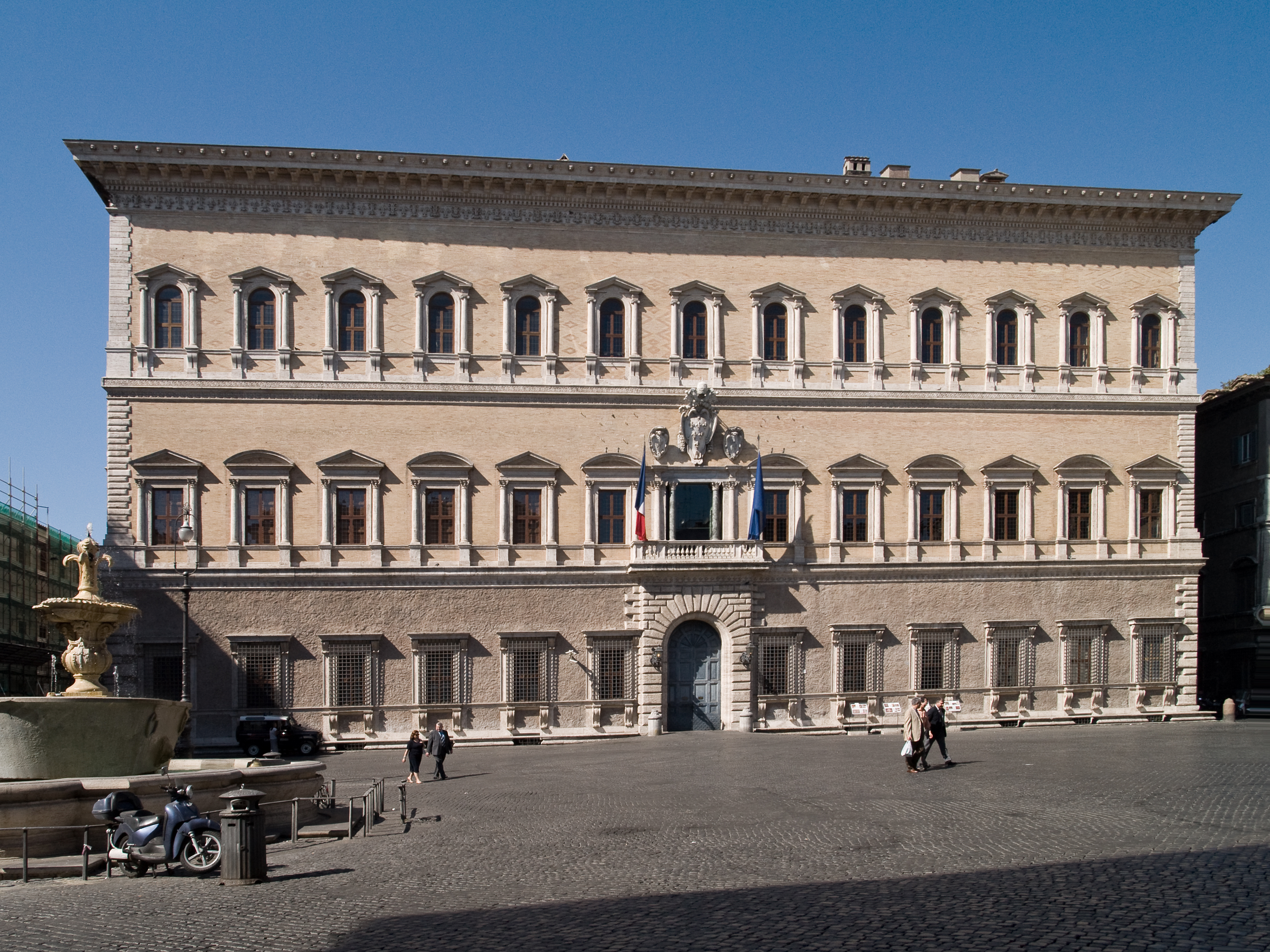
- Palazzo Farnese in Rome
- Click on the map for a fullscreen view

General information
- Architectural style: Renaissance
- Location: Rome, Italy
- Coordinates: 41°53′41″N 12°28′15″E
- Client: Pope Paul III

Design and construction
- Architects: Antonio da Sangallo the Younger; Michelangelo; Vignola

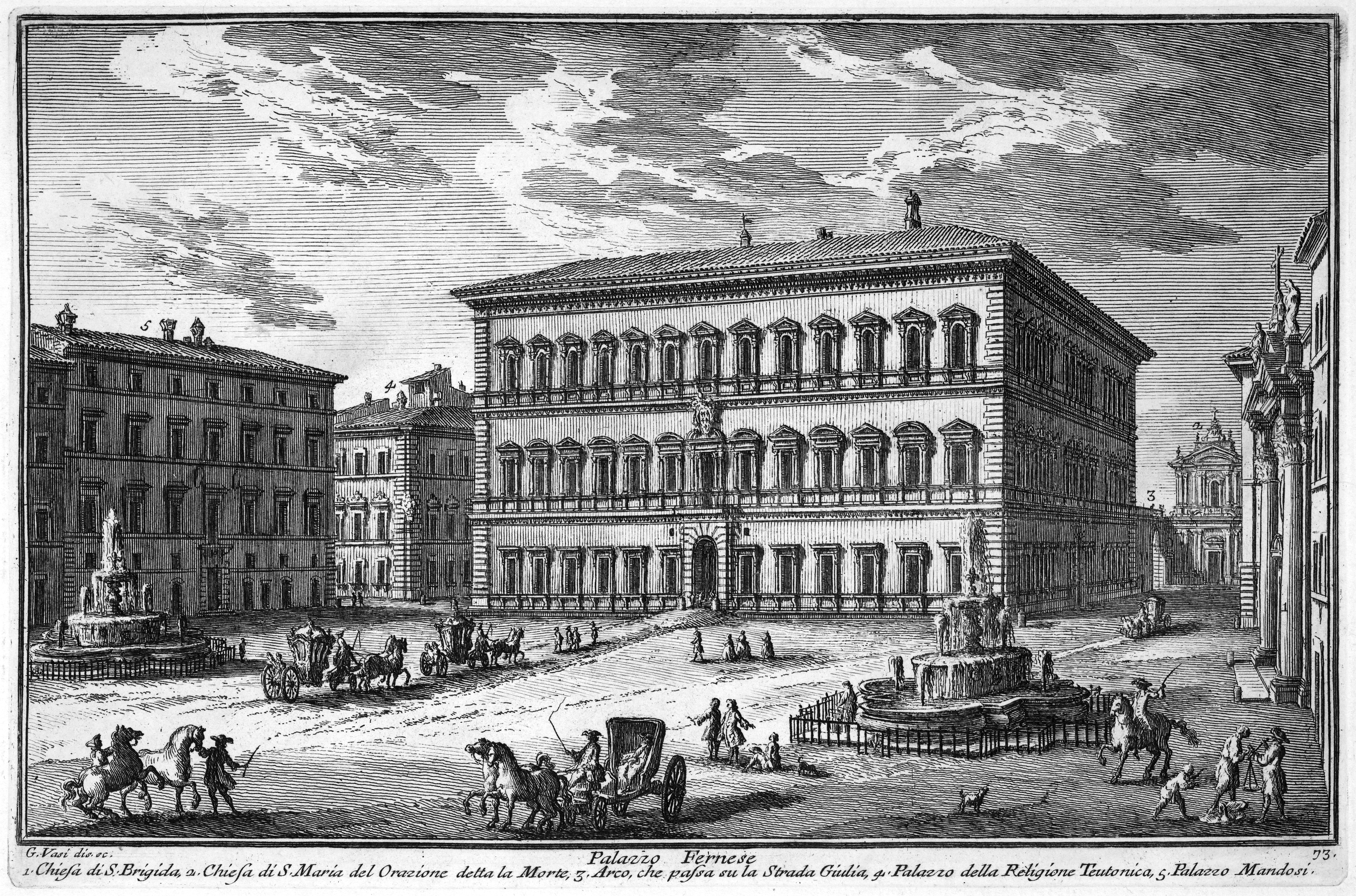
A mid-18th-century engraving of Palazzo Farnese by Giuseppe Vasi.

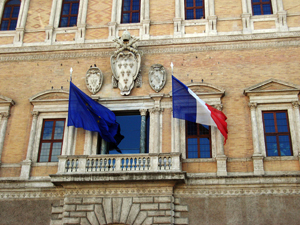
The coat of arms of Farnese Pope Paul III

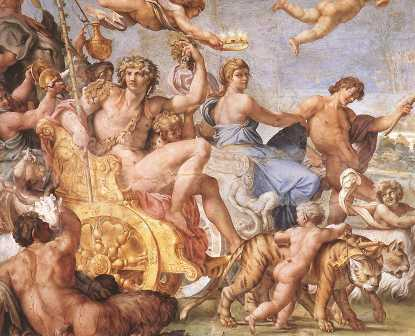
Detail of the Triumph of Bacchus and Ariadne by Annibale Carracci, the Farnese Gallery, 1595.

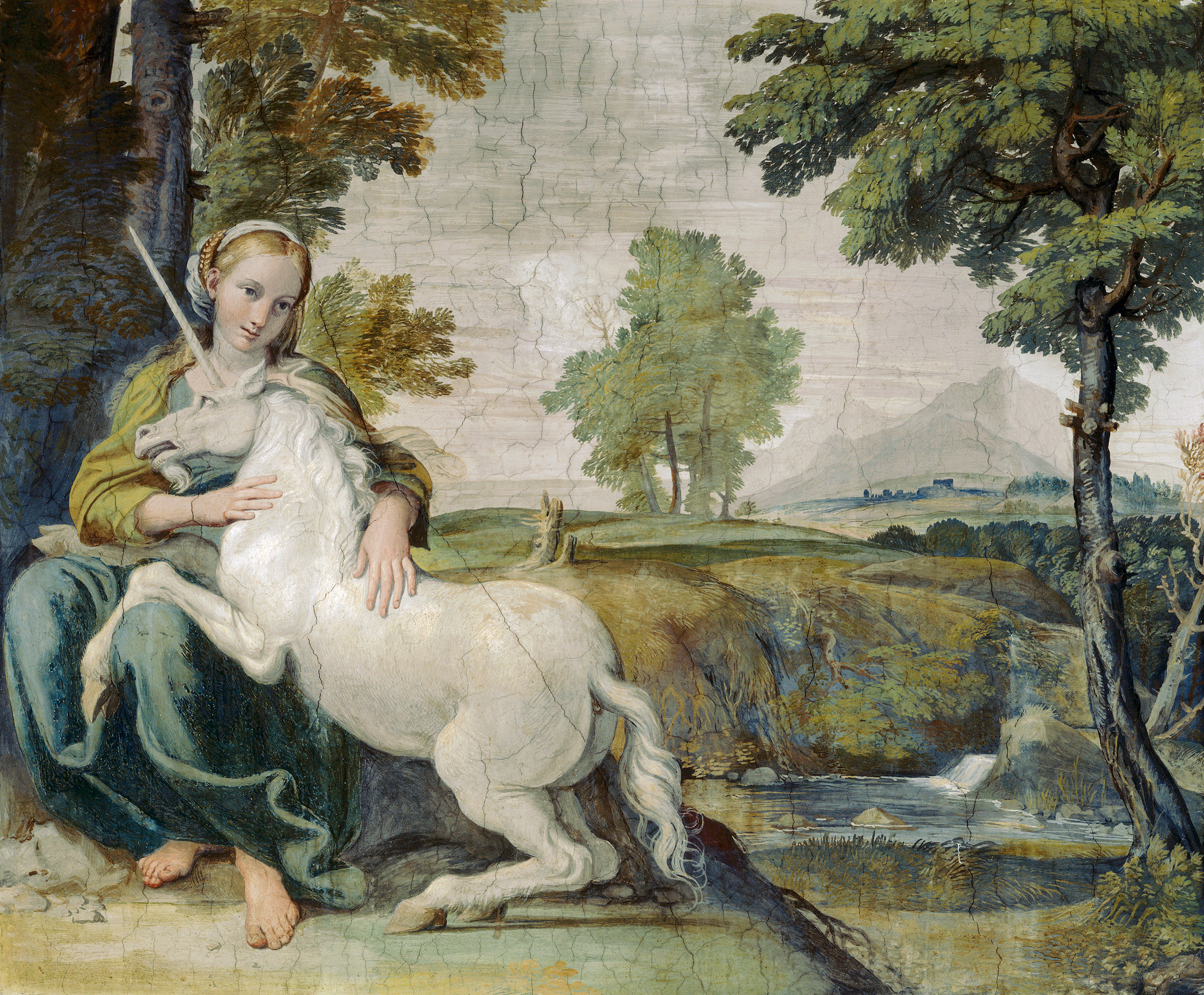
A Virgin with a Unicorn, depicting Giulia Farnese by Domenichino, c. 1604–05

Palazzo Farnese ([paˈlattso farˈneːze, -eːse]) or Farnese Palace is one of the most important High Renaissance palaces in Rome. Owned by the Italian Republic, it was given to the French government in 1936 for a period of 99 years, and currently serves as the French Embassy in Italy.

First designed in 1517 for the Farnese family, the building expanded in size and conception when Alessandro Farnese became Pope Paul III in 1534, to designs by Antonio da Sangallo the Younger. Its building history involved some of the most prominent Italian architects of the 16th century, including Michelangelo, Jacopo Barozzi da Vignola and Giacomo della Porta.

At the end of the 16th century, the important fresco cycle of The Loves of the Gods in the Farnese Gallery was carried out by the Bolognese painter Annibale Carracci, marking the beginning of two divergent trends in painting during the 17th century, the Roman High Baroque and Classicism. The famous Farnese sculpture collection, now in the National Archeological Museum of Naples, as well as other Farnese collections, now mostly in Capodimonte Museum in Naples, were accommodated in the palace.

== History ==
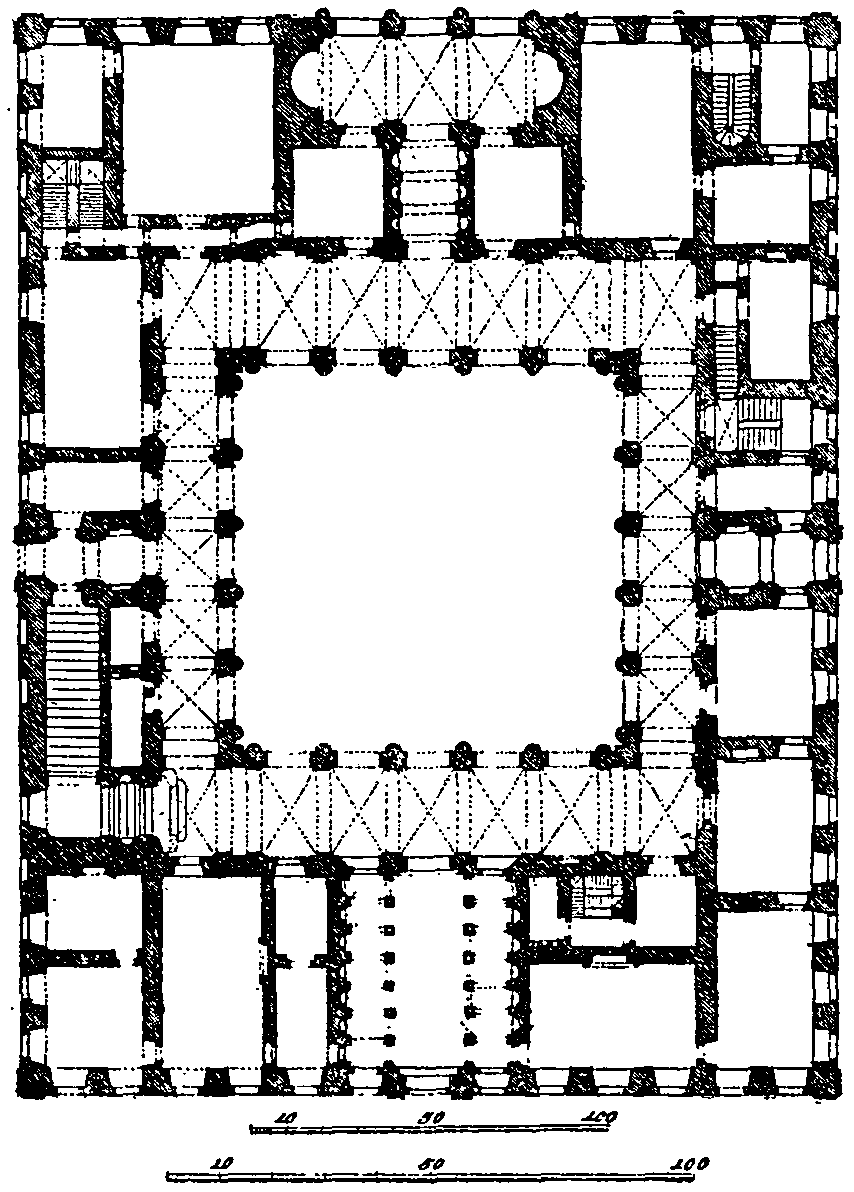
Floor plan of Palazzo Farnese

"The most imposing Italian palace of the 16th century", according to Sir Banister Fletcher, this palazzo was designed by Antonio da Sangallo the Younger, one of Bramante's assistants in the design of St. Peter's and an important Renaissance architect in his own right. Construction began in 1515 after one or two years of preparation, and was commissioned by Alessandro Farnese, who had been appointed as a cardinal in 1493 at age 25 and was living a princely lifestyle. Work was interrupted by the Sack of Rome in 1527.

When, in January 1534 Alessandro became Pope Paul III, the size of the palace was increased significantly and he employed Michelangelo who completed the redesigned third story with its deep cornice and revised the courtyard as well. The post-1534 developments were not only a reflection of Alessandro's change in status but employed architecture to express the power of the Farnese family, much as at their Villa Farnese at Caprarola. The massive palace block and its facade dominate the Piazza Farnese.

Architectural features of the main facade include the alternating triangular and segmental pediments that cap the windows of the piano nobile, the central rusticated portal and Michelangelo's projecting cornice which throws a deep shadow on the top of the facade. Michelangelo revised the central window in 1541, adding an architrave to give a central focus to the facade, above which is the largest papal stemma, or coat-of-arms with papal tiara, Rome had ever seen. When Paul appeared on the balcony, the entire facade became a setting for his person. The courtyard, initially open arcades, is ringed by an academic exercise in ascending orders (Doric, Ionic and Corinthian). The piano nobile entablature was given a frieze with garlands, added by Michelangelo.

On the garden side of the palace, which faced the River Tiber, Michelangelo proposed the innovatory design of a bridge which, if completed, would have linked the palace with the gardens of the Vigna Farnese, Alessandro's holding on the opposite bank, that later became incorporated into the adjacent villa belonging to the Chigi family, which the Farnese purchased in 1584 and renamed the Villa Farnesina. While the practicalities of achieving this bridge remain dubious, the idea was a bold and expansive one.

During the 16th century, two large granite basins from the Baths of Caracalla were adapted as fountains in the Piazza Farnese, the "urban" face of the palace.

The palazzo was further modified for the papal nephew Ranuccio Farnese by Jacopo Barozzi da Vignola. It was completed for the second Cardinal Alessandro Farnese by Giacomo della Porta's porticoed facade towards the Tiber which was finished in 1589.

Following the death of Cardinal Odoardo Farnese in 1626, the palazzo stood virtually uninhabited for twenty years. At the conclusion of the War of Castro with the papacy, Duke Odoardo was able to regain his family properties, which had been sequestered. The resulting inventory is the oldest surviving complete inventory of Palazzo Farnese.

After Odoardo's death, Pope Alexander VII allowed Queen Christina of Sweden to lodge in the palace for several months, but she "proved a tenant from hell". After her departure for Paris, the papal authorities discovered that her unruly servants not only had stolen the silver, tapestries, and paintings, but also had "smashed up doors for firewood" and removed sections of copper roofing.

== Interior decorations ==
Several main rooms were frescoed with elaborate allegorical programs including the Hercules cycle in the Sala d'Ercole or the Hercules Room, the "Sala del Mappamondo" or The Room of Maps, and the well known The Loves of the Gods (1597–1608) in the Farnese Gallery, both by the Bolognese painter Annibale Carracci. Other rooms have frescoes by Daniele da Volterra and by other artists.

For generations, the room with Herculean frescoes accommodated the famous Greco-Roman antique sculpture known as the Farnese Hercules. Other works from the family collection of classical sculpture were also housed in the palace.

One of the vault and ceiling frescoes by Annibale Carracci is Galleria Farnese, an art gallery. According to Ann Sutherland Harris, "The Galleria frescoes make even more extensive use of ancient sculptural and architectural sources, and in addition take their basic structure from two ceilings by the most prestigious artists of the High Renaissance in Rome, the Loggia of Psyche by Raphael and Michelangelo's Sistine Chapel ceiling". Carracci adopted the quadri riportati, which the ceiling is divided into units and turned it into a collection of framed paintings, along with the cast masks among the garlands, and carved putti, and sculptures supporting the central scene. This large central scene depicts the triumphal progress of Bacchus and Ariadne. Two smaller paintings are attached to the top and bottom of the central picture, and two vertical pictures on either side, filled with sphinxes, Pan, and two satyrs.

== Inspired works ==
The Palazzo's design has inspired several buildings outside Italy, including the Detroit Athletic Club in Detroit, Michigan; Château Grimaldi near Aix-en-Provence, France; the National Building Museum in Washington, D.C., US; the Chief Secretary's Building in Sydney; the Banco di Roma in Alexandria, Egypt; the Royal Palace, Stockholm, and the Cunard Building in Liverpool. Also in England, Charles Barry's great admiration for the building led him to use it as the model for London's Reform Club.

== Puccini's Tosca ==
In Puccini's opera Tosca (1900), set in Napoleonic Rome, the heroine's confrontation with the malevolent chief of police, Scarpia, takes place in Palazzo Farnese. The Palazzo was inherited from the Farnese by the Bourbon kings of Naples, from whom the French government purchased it in 1874. Though the government of Benito Mussolini purchased it in 1936, the French Embassy remains, under a 99-year lease for which they pay the Italian government a symbolic fee of 1 euro per month.

== Palazzo Farnese library ==
The Palazzo Farnese houses the great scholarly library amassed by the Ecole Française de Rome, concentrating especially on the archeology of Italy and medieval Papal history. The Ecole Française de Rome embarked on a massive project of publishing as much of the documentation of the constructing of the palazzo, its frescoes and furnishings, library and works of art, fully annotated and indexed. The first three volumes are:

- F.C. Uginet, Le palais farnèse à travers les documents financiers (Rome 1980).
- A. Chastel, Le Palais Farnèse. Ecole Française de Rome I.1 and I.2 and II (Rome 1980–82).
- F. Fossier. Le Palais Farnèse III.2. La bibliothèque Farnèse. Étude des manuscrits latins et en langue vernaculaire (Rome 1982).
- B. Jestaz, Le Palais Farnèse III.3. L'inventaire du palais et des propriétés Farnèse à Rome en 1644 (Rome 1994)

== Palazzo Farnese in popular culture ==
The Palazzo Farnese was filmed as part of the 2013 Julian Fellowes re-creation of Shakespeare's Romeo and Juliet starring Douglas Booth as Romeo.

== See also ==
- Sebastiano Conca
- Jacopo Zoboli

Preceded by Palazzo della Consulta	Landmarks of Rome; Palazzo Farnese	Succeeded by Palazzo Fusconi-Pighini
