= Democritus (Ribera) =

1630 painting by Jusepe de Ribera

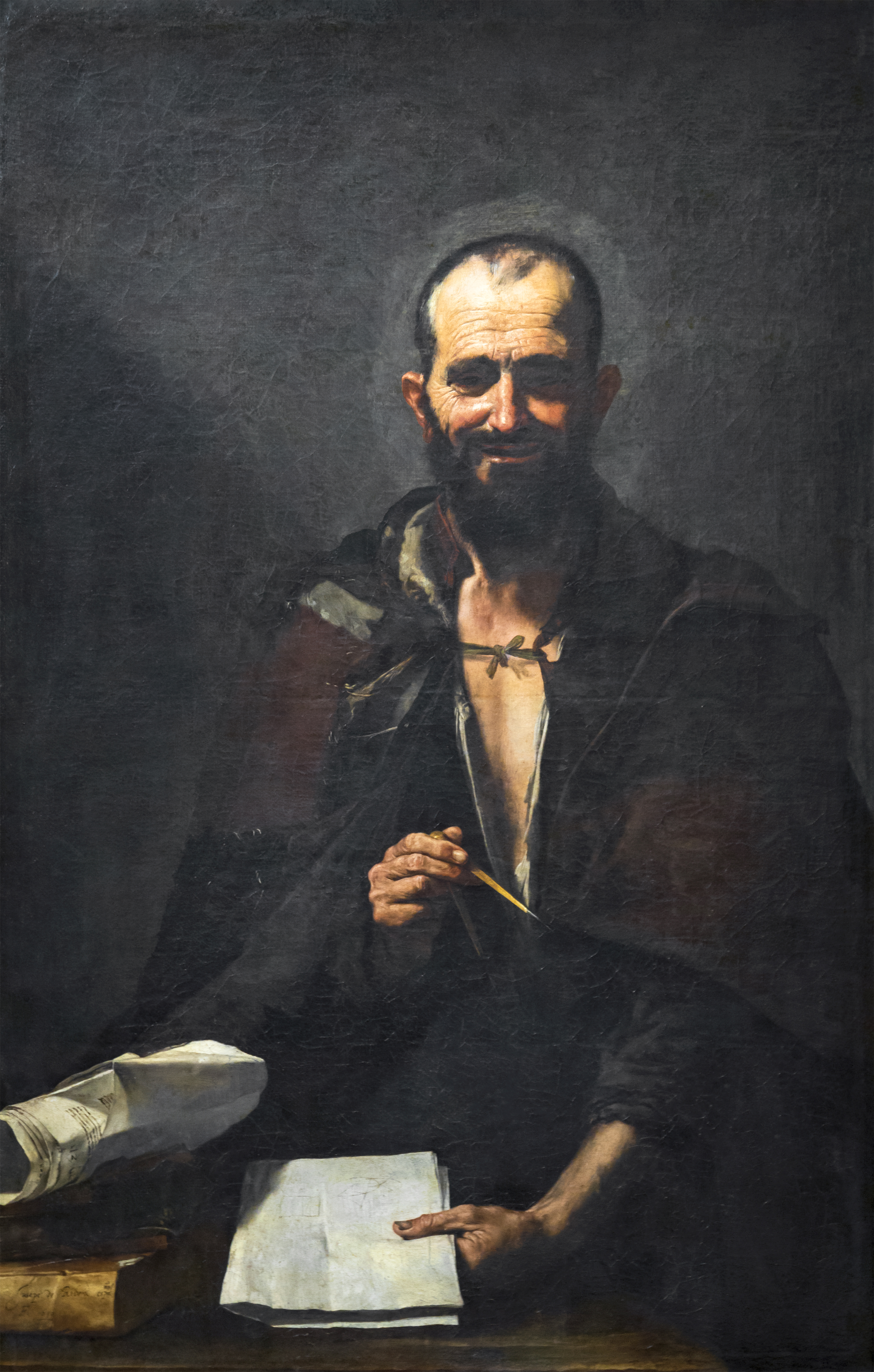
- Artist: Jusepe de Ribera
- Year: 1630
- Medium: oil painting on canvas
- Movement: Baroque
- Dimensions: 125 cm × 81 cm (49 in × 32 in)
- Location: Museo del Prado, Madrid

Democritus is an oil on canvas painting by Jusepe de Ribera, executed in 1630, now in the Museo del Prado, in Madrid. It is believed to depict the Ancient Greek philosopher Democritus.

== History ==
Although tradition has always recognized the character portrayed as Archimedes, due to the compass of his hand and the papers with geometric signs that surround him, Delphine Fitz Darby proposed in 1962 to identify him as Democritus, because of the frank smile he shows since, precisely, Democritus he is known as "the philosopher who laughs". It could then be the painting known as Philosopher with Compass, a work whose whereabouts is unknown and is known to have belonged to the Duke of Alcalá, Ribera's main client between 1629 and 1631. In any case, Archimedes or Democritus, the work would be the oldest of the paintings that make the series "Ragged Philosophers".

The first documentary evidence of the work places it in El Escorial in 1764 and later it will become part of the collections of the Prado Museum where it is kept.

== Description and style ==
The philosopher is portrayed half-length, dressed as a beggar and holding a compass with his right hand, while with his left he holds some papers where some geometric symbols are represented. On the spine of the book, lower right, the signature and the date are written, "Jusepe de Ribera español / F 1630". The painting is cropped on the right side.

His smiling face with deep wrinkles and his bony long-fingered hands are the focus of the composition and are rendered with great fidelity and great naturalism. A light enters from the left, bathing the philosopher's body, which together with a halo of lighter paint around the head and the neutral background highlights him, giving the composition a greater perspective and realism. It is believed that Ribera had a model pose for the picture, possibly someone anonymous found on the street, whom he portrayed as if he were a nobleman or a king.

Nícola Spinosa defines it in the study of his work: "A true portrait of any peasant found in the alleys of viceregal Naples, in which the painter knew how to capture precisely the signs of the ancient Greco-Levantine origin, inserted in a context of irreducible vitality and typically Mediterranean humanity."
