= Democrates of Aphidna =

Ancient Greek politician

Democrates of Aphidna (/dɪˈmɒkrəˌtiːz/) was an ancient Greek politician who supported the Peace of Philocrates. He was the son of Sophilus, and descended from one of the tyrannicides Harmodius and Aristogeiton. Democrates was one of the Athenian ambassadors who went to receive oaths of peace from Philip II of Macedon after the Peace of Philocrates, and later one of the ambassadors who accompanied Demosthenes to negotiate a treaty against Philip with the Thebans. In around 337 B.C., he co-pleaded for Philippides of Paiania during the trial "Hypereides against Philippides". He was also known as a man of some wit, but not as a great orator. A fragment of his oration has been preserved.
