= Bonato =

Bonato is a surname. Notable people with the surname include:

- Paola Bonato (born 1961), Italian footballer
- Pietro Bonato (1765–1820), Italian painter
- Yann Bonato (born 1972), French basketball player
- Yoann Bonato (born 1983), French rally driver
