= Cantini =

Cantini is an Italian surname. Notable people with the surname include:

- Giovacchino Cantini (c. 1780–1844), Italian engraver
- Guido Cantini (1889–1945), Italian playwright and screenwriter
- Jules Cantini (1826–1916), French sculptor and philanthropist
- Massimo Cantini Parrini (born 1972), Italian costume designer
- Sébastien Cantini (born 1987), French professional football player
- Virgil Cantini (1919–2009), American enamelist, sculptor and educator

== See also ==
- Musée Cantini, museum in Marseilles
