= Montagnani =

Montagnani (pronounced [montaɲˈɲaːni]) is an Italian surname from Arezzo and Modena, derived from local towns. Notable people with the surname include:

- Luigi Montagnani (1922–2000), Italian businessman and sports director
- Nerina Montagnani (1897–1993), Italian actress
- Paolo Montagnani (born 1968), Italian volleyball coach and former player
- Piero Montagnani (1901–1976), Italian anti-fascist partisan and politician
- Pietro Paolo Montagnani (1740–?), Italian engraver and publisher
- Renzo Montagnani (1930–1997), Italian actor

== See also ==
- Montagnana (surname)
