= Giuseppe Pannini =

18th-century architect

Giuseppe Pannini or Panini (Rome, 1720–1810 or 1812 or possibly 1718–1805), also Joseph Pannini, was an architect, scenographer and archaeologist living in Rome, capital of the Papal States, present-day Italy, in the transitory period between Late Baroque and Neoclassicism.

== Early life ==
Giuseppe Pannini was one of two sons of Giovanni Paolo Panini, a famed 18th-century Italian veduta painter and architect in Rome, who, each, followed in their father's footsteps in other domains:

Giuseppe Pannini was an architect, like his father, as well as an archaeologist, working in Rome. He used to co-sign prints representing his work with Joseph Pannini, Architectus.

His brother Francesco Panini (Rome, 1745–1812), was an architecture and landscape painter, draughtsman and publisher of prints, and collaborator of his father.

Over time, Giuseppe and Francesco have been confused with the other. For instance, Bryan's Dictionary describes a short biography on Giuseppe that can only be about his brother Francesco.

== Career ==
Not much is known of his career, but Giuseppe Panini is recognised as the architect having completed, in 1762, the construction of the Trevi Fountain after the death of Nicola Salvi, who made the initial design. Earlier, Pope Benedict XIV, born Prospero Lambertini, had commissioned Pannini to realise the church Sant'Isidore alla Terme (1754–1755), on the edge of the Baths of Diocletian in Rome. Only the simple but pretty little baroque facade and a gutted interior space survive the demolition work done during archaeological investigations in 1940.

Mostly active in Rome, he not only created celebratory or funerary displays, often in collaboration with Ferdinando Fuga (Naples, 1700 – Rome, 1781), but he also provided architectural designs for the Palazzo Corsini (1751) and executed the ornately decorated cantoria, a gallery for musicians and singers, above the entrance of the church of Santa Maria della Scala (ca. 1756).

In 1775, Pannini worked on the reconstruction and redecoration of the vaulted ceiling in the Santissima Trinità dei Monti church, at the top of the Spanish Steps.

During the extensive restoration and transformation works by Duke Sforza-Cesarini between 1781 and 1794, Pannini realised a decorative cycle with architectural perspectives using trompe l'œil techniques in the interior of the Palazzo Sforza Cesarini in Rome, originally built in 1458 as the seat of the Apostolic Chancellery by Cardinal Rodrigo Borgia, later renamed the Cancelleria Vecchia.

In 1789, Giovanni Volpato, a celebrated engraver and publisher of prints, collaborated with Giuseppe Pannini on commemorative prints showing the temporary funeral architecture that Pannini, in his capacity of architect and scenographer, built inside the church of the Santa Maria in Monserrato degli Spagnoli on the occasion of the death of Charles III of Spain in 1788.

As an archaeologist, he worked on several ventures. In 1753 Cardinal Silvio Valenti Gonzaga, Pope Benedict XIV's Camerlengo, sent the Pannini to the site of the Odeum, a Roman theatre on the estate of Hadrian's Villa, to report on the rumours that the Bulgarini family had been stripping the Ancient Roman monument of its last marble. His survey took the form of three large plates, engraved in copper by Carlo Fidanza, (c. 1731–1775), of which two prints are now in the McNay Art Museum's collection.

Pannini also took part in the pontifical excavations in the Umbrian town of Otricoli from 1775 onwards. In the octagonal hall of the ancient Roman Baths of Ocriculum, a giant marble head of Jupiter, the Giove di Otricoli (1st C. BC), was unearthed under the direction of Giuseppe Pannini and Vincenzo Cecchi, around 1781–1782, which can now be seen in the Sala Rotonda in the Museo Pio Clementino.

Maria Celeste Cola mentions that Giuseppe Pannini was commissioned in 1779 to reproduce the monumental octagonal floor mosaic (3rd C. A.D.) showing a fight between the Lapiths and centaurs and marine thiasos, also unearthed in Otricoli, now displayed in that same room at the Vatican Museums (inv. 45751). Francesco Panini, his brother, made the coloured engraving shown on the right to mark this occasion.

The Rodolfo Lanciani Collection in Bergamo, Italy, holds a number of plain or coloured prints by both Francesco and Giuseppe Pannini.

== Gallery ==
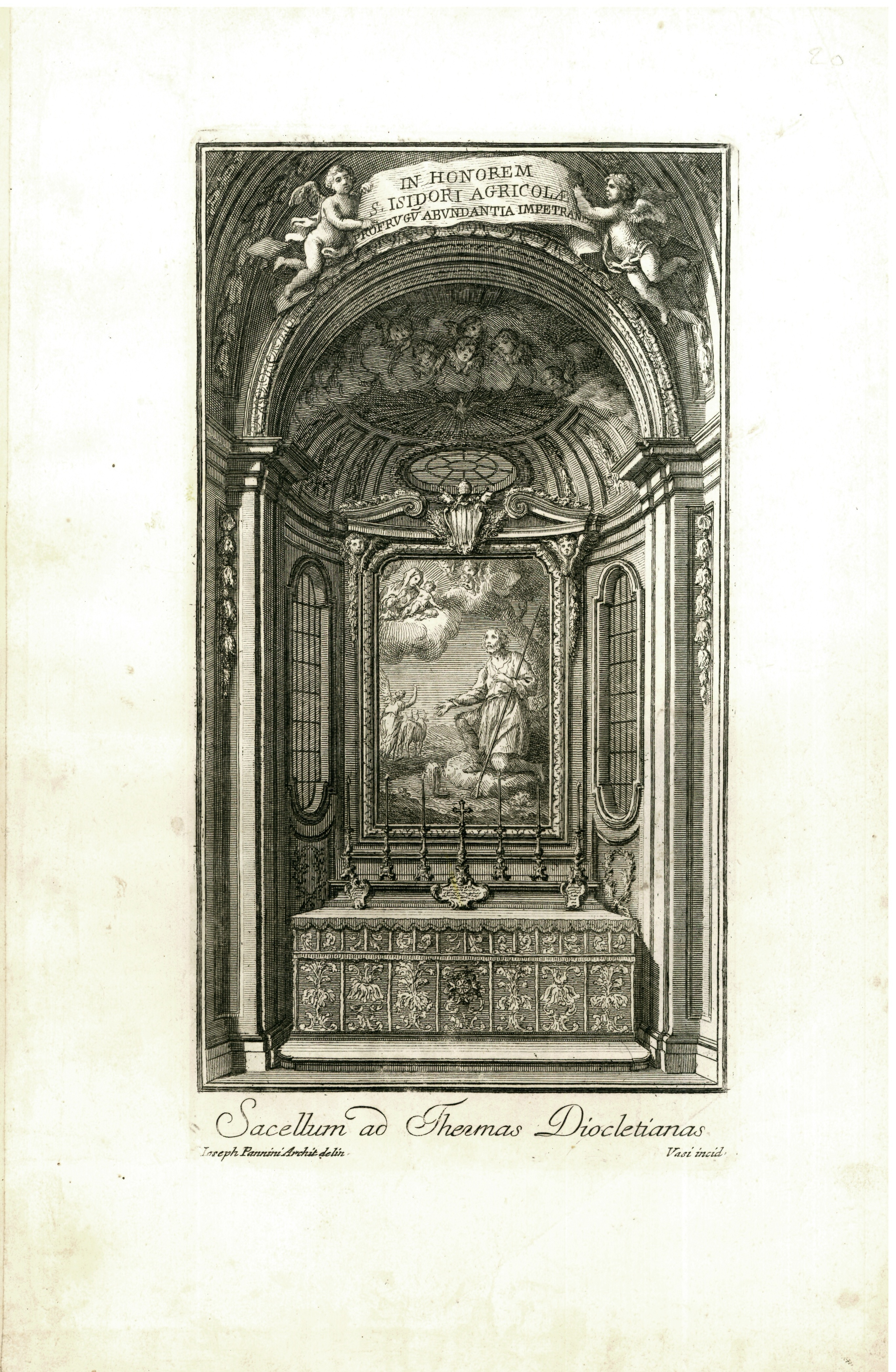
High altar of the lost church of Sant'Isidoro in Rome, architect Joseph Pannini, 18th-century engraving by Giuseppe Vasi

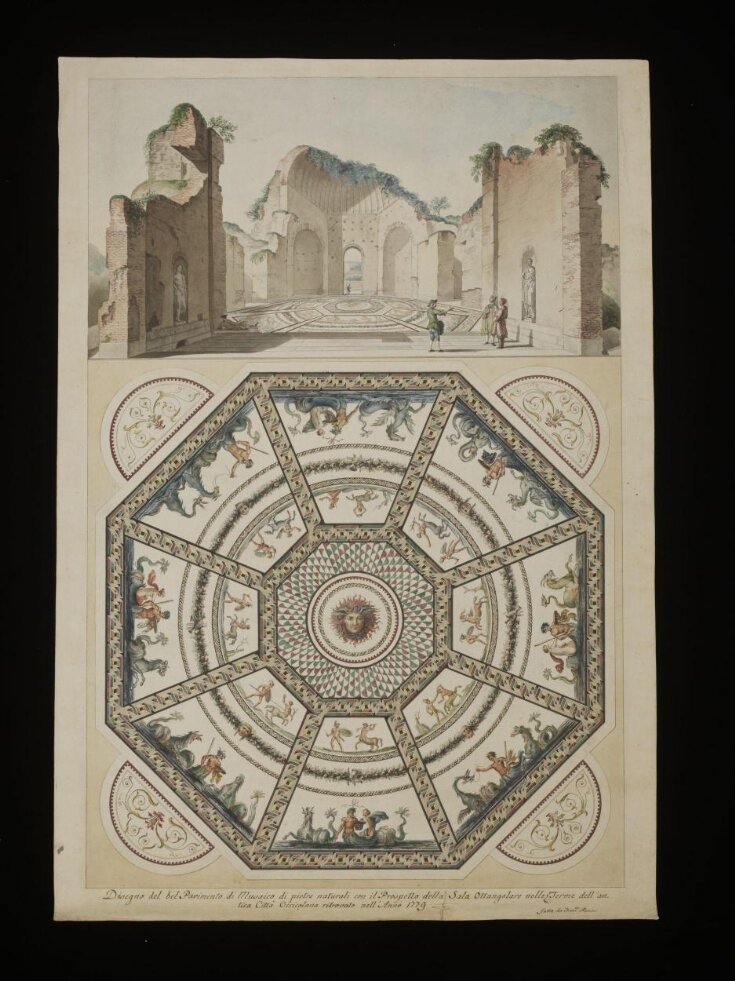
View of the ruins of the octagonal room in the ancient Roman Baths at Ocriculum (Umbria) and its floor mosaic (1779) by Panini, after an architectural design by Giuseppe Pannini, his brother. (Victoria & Albert Museum)

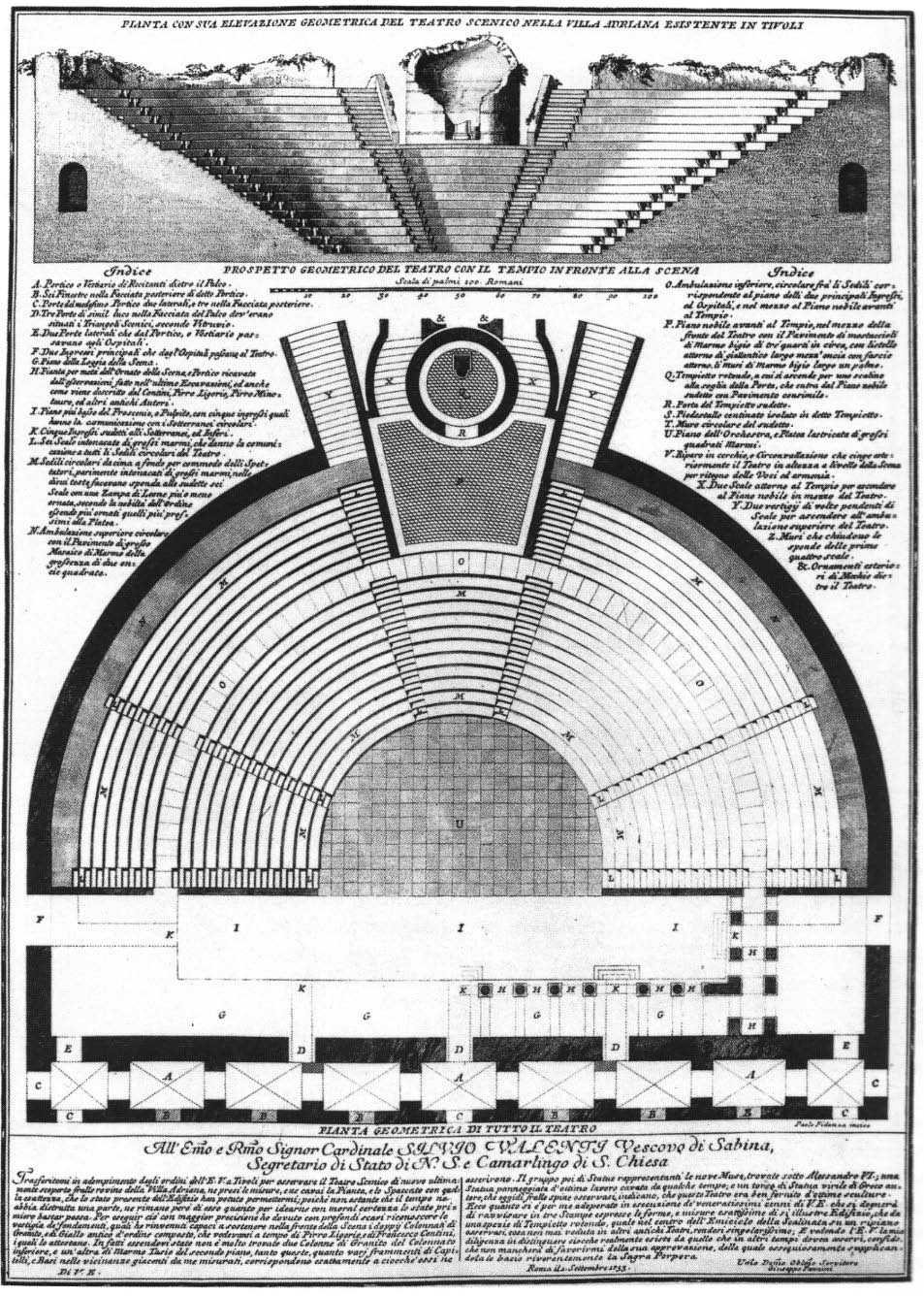
Elevation and ground plan for the South Theatre (Odeon) at Hadrian's Villa, Tivoli (1753) by Pannini, architect & Paolo Fidanza, engraver

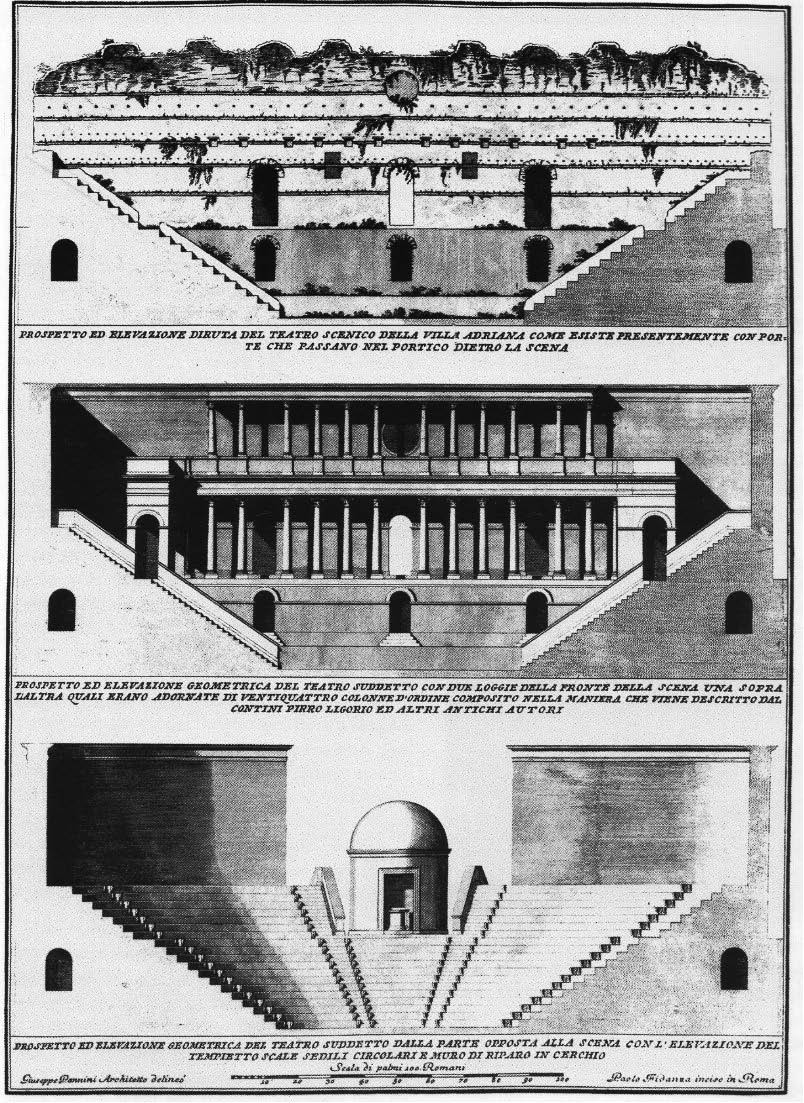
Elevation views of the South Theatre (Odeon) at Hadrian's Villa, Tivoli (1753) by Giuseppe Pannini, architect & Paolo Fidanza, engraver
