= Pietro Bonato =

Italian painter (1764–1813)

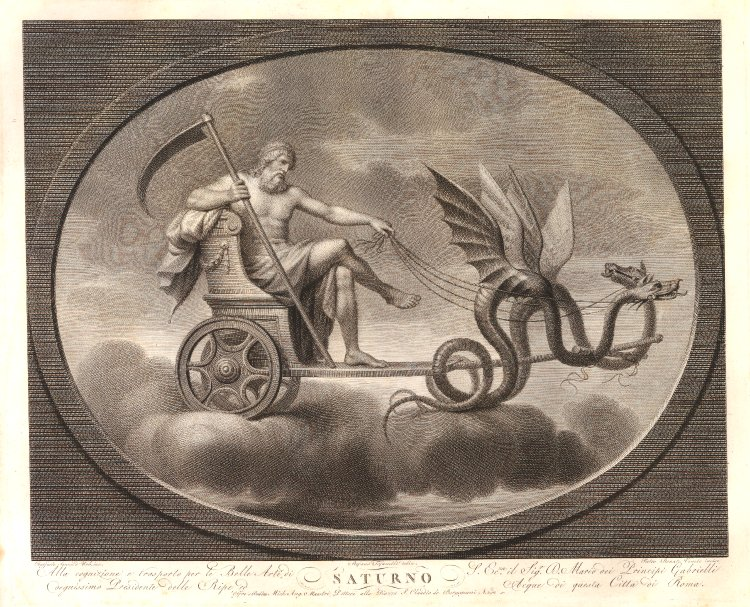
Saturn seated in a chariot drawn by a winged serpent-like monster, After Raphael

Pietro Bonato (1764–1813) was an Italian painter and engraver of the Baroque. He was born at Bassano and was a pupil of Giovanni Volpato. He engraved plates after Guido Reni and Correggio.

He worked with Giuseppe Bortignoni the Younger in engraving ceiling decorations from the Vatican.
