= Giovanni Folo =

Italian engraver (1764–1836)

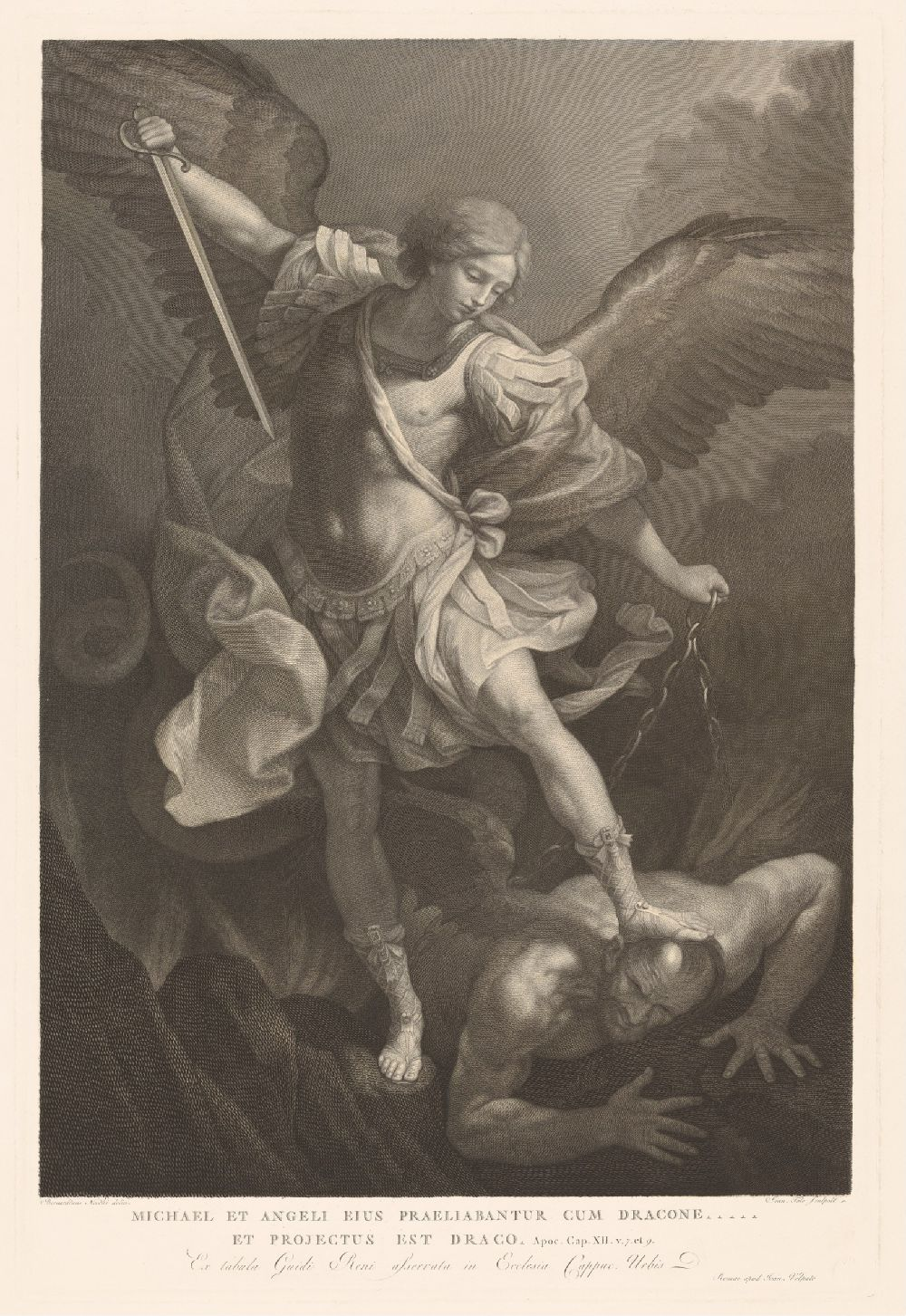
Giovanni Folo after Guido Reni, "Archangel Michael Casting Down Satan," c. 1780–1836, engraving and etching

Giovanni Folo (1764–1836) was an Italian engraver of the Neoclassic period, active in Italy.

Folo was born in Bassano del Grappa. He originally studied with Giulio Golini and Giovanni Battista Mengardi in Venice. In 1781 he moved to Rome to study with Giovanni Volpato, but later he followed the style of Volpato's pupil, Raffaello Morghen, gaining fame for his engravings after famous paintings and sculptures of the most eminent masters, including Raphael, Michelangelo, Titian, Nicolas Poussin, Bertel Thorwaldsen, Antonio Canova and others. He was a member of the Academy of Saint Luke (Accademia di San Luca) in Rome, and died in Rome. In 1836, he was elected into the National Academy of Design as an Honorary Academician.

== Gallery ==
Works by Folo
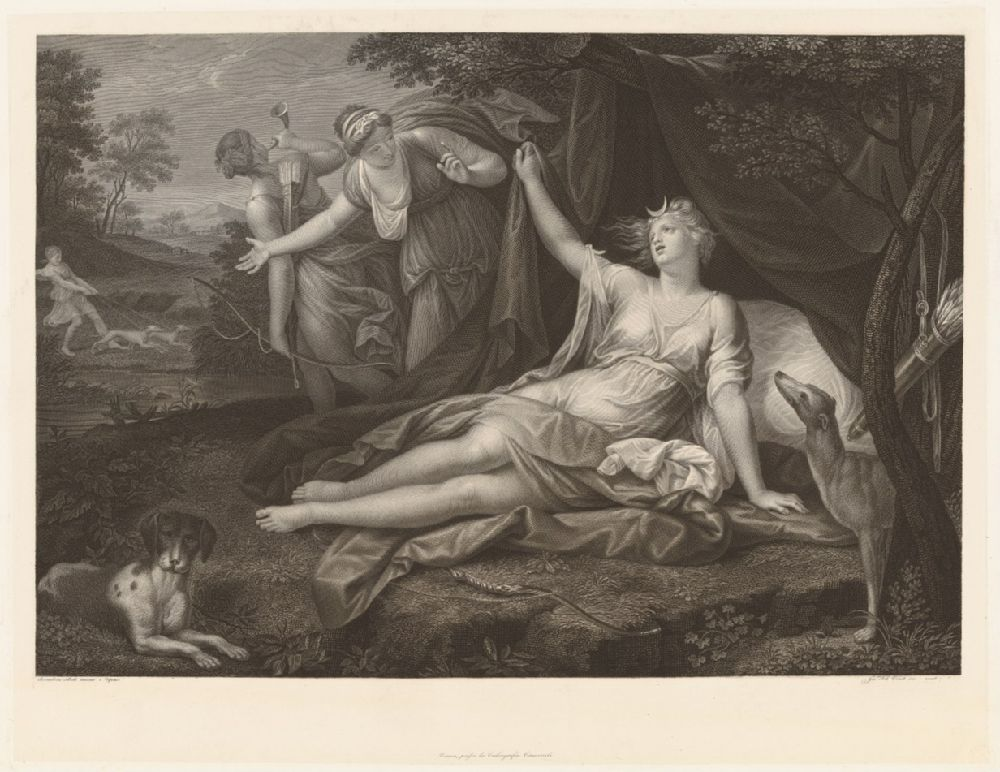
Giovanni Folo after Bernardino Nocchi, "Diana Woken by Nymphs," c. 1800–1836, engraving and etching

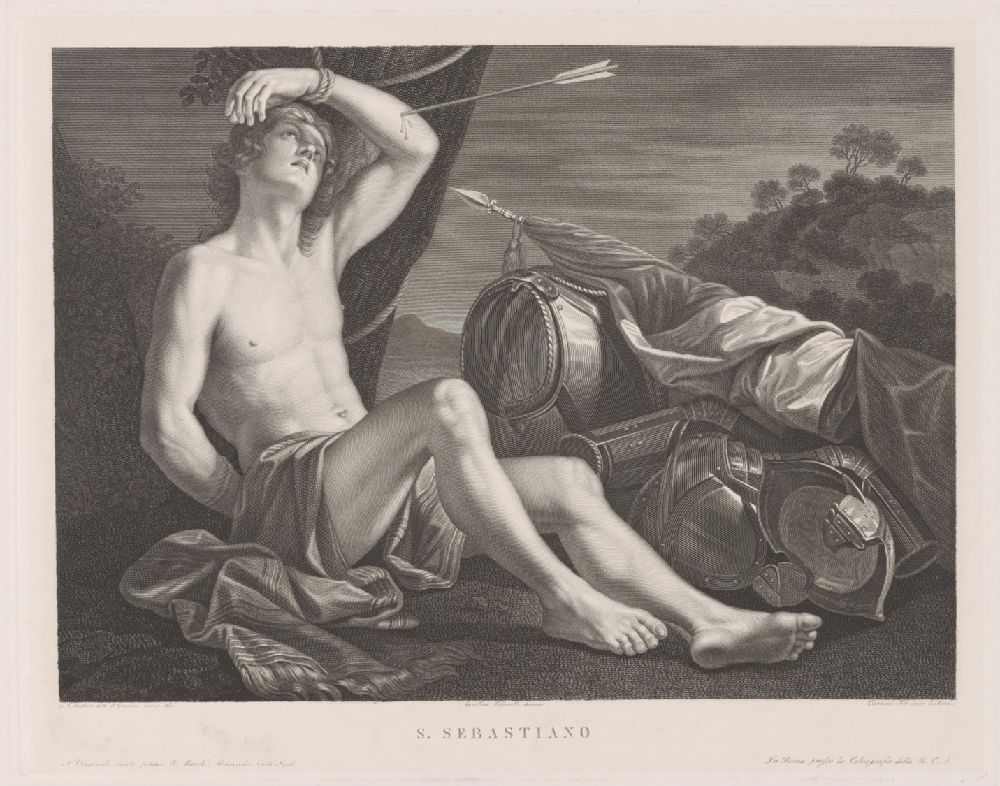
Giovanni Folo after Guercino, "San Sebastian," published between 1870 and 1910, engraving

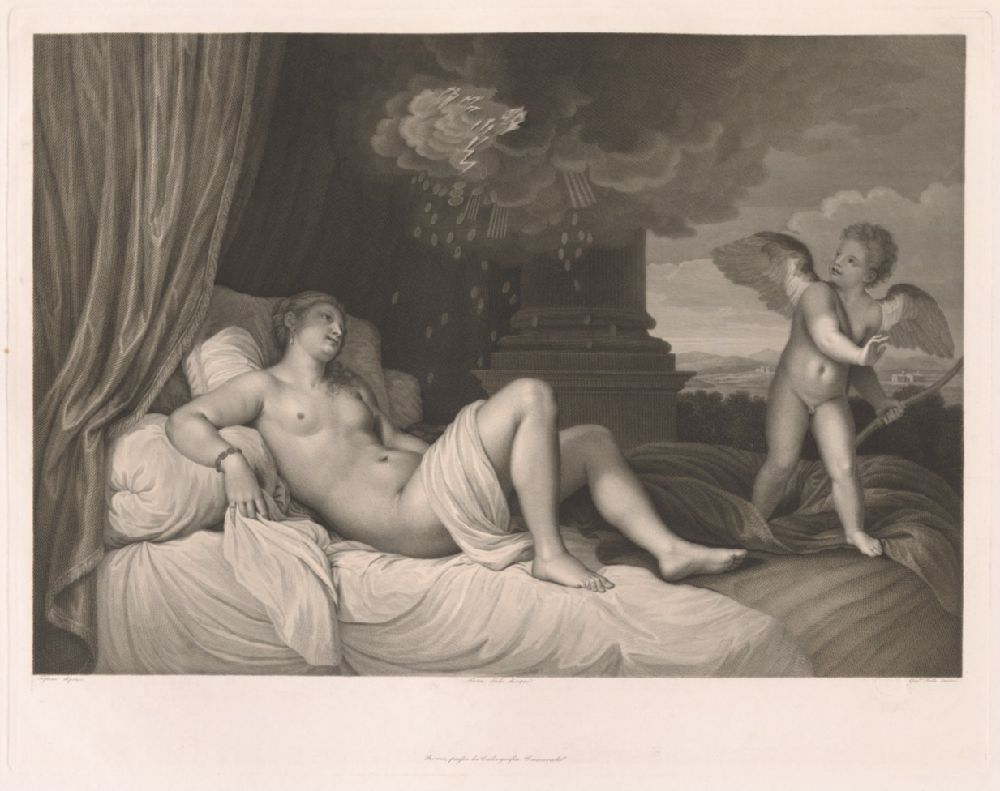
Giovanni Folo after Titian, "Danaë," published 1832, engraving and etching

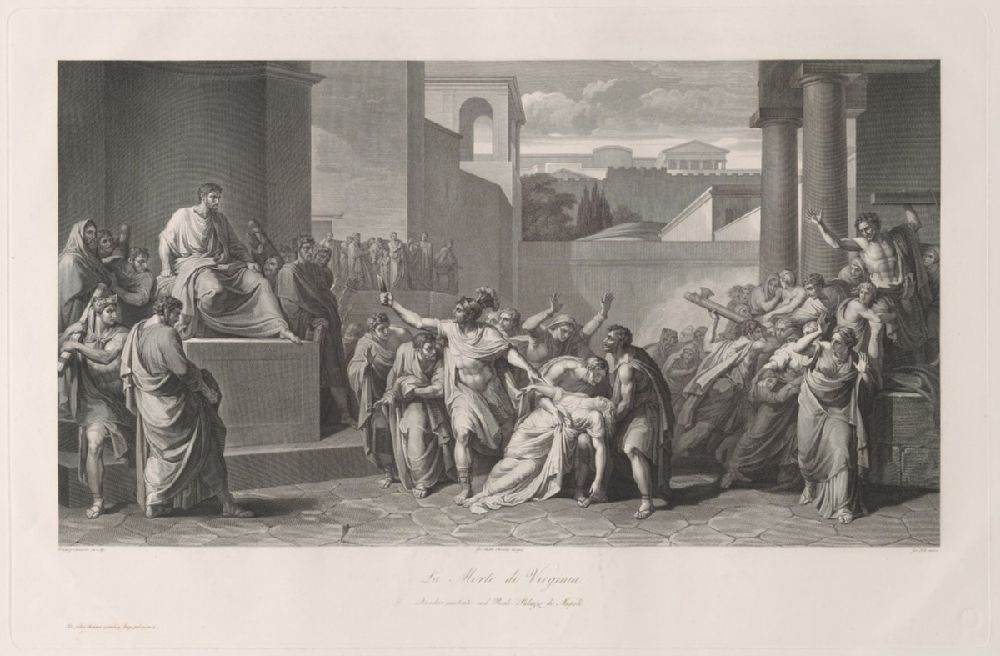
Giovanni Folo after Vincenzo Camuccini, "The Death of Virginia," published between 1870 and 1909, engraving and etching
