= Montagnana (surname) =

Montagnana (pronounced [montaɲˈɲaːna]) is an Italian surname from Veneto, derived from the town of Montagnana, Padua. Notable people with the surname include:

- Antonio Montagnana (fl. 1730–50), Italian operatic bass
- Domenico Montagnana (1686–1750), Italian master luthier
- Jacopo da Montagnana (c. 1440/43–1499), Italian painter
- Mario Montagnana (1897–1960), Italian journalist, trade unionist and politician
- Rita Montagnana (1895–1979), Italian politician

== See also ==
- Montagnani
