= Pietro Bettelini =

Swiss engraver (1763–1829)

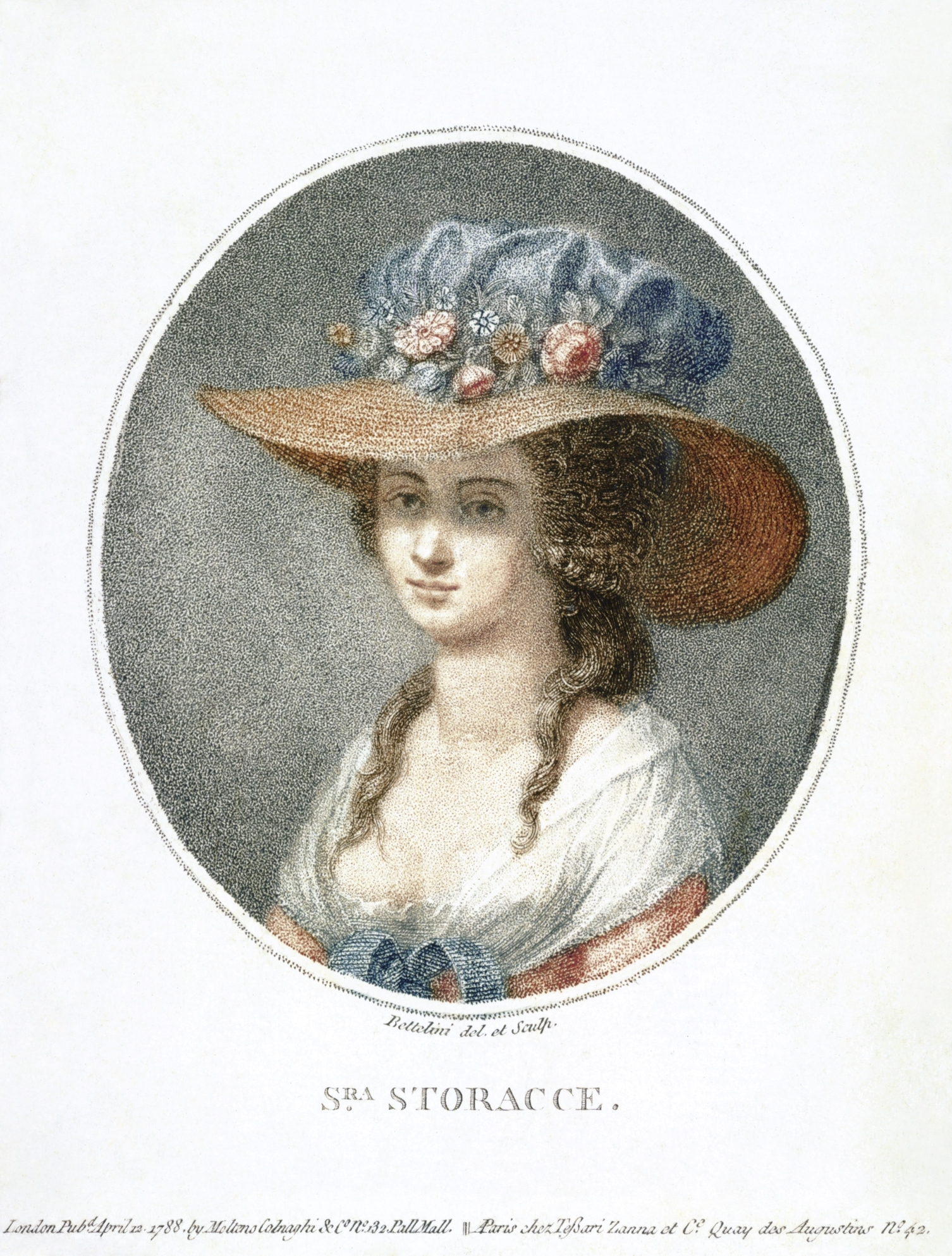
Portrait of Nancy Storace by Pietro Bettelini, now in the library of the Goethe University Frankfurt

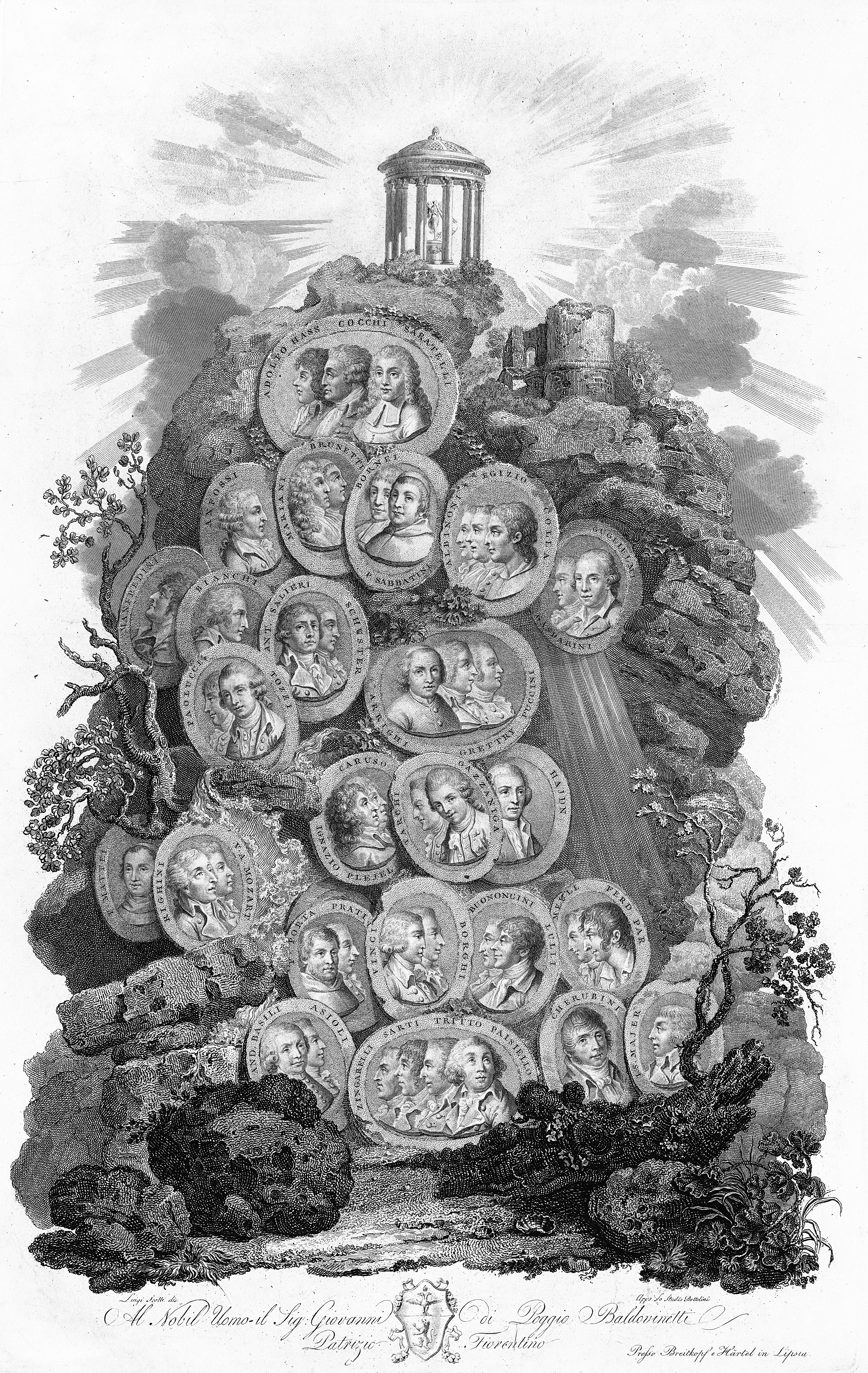
Tableau of Italian composers, c. 1790

Pietro Bettelini (6 September 1763 – 27 September 1829) was a Swiss engraver.

== Life ==
Bettelini was born in Caslano, and began studying art at a young age. He received instruction from Gandolfi and Bartolozzi; but in his subsequent works he inclined more to the style of Raphael Morghen. He died at Rome in 1828.

== Works ==
Bettelini was held in high estimation by Thorwaldsen, who employed him to engrave some of his finest works, both figures and bassi-rilievi. His engraving of the Entombment, by Andrea del Sarto, in the Florence Gallery is considered among his finest examples of art. His works include:

- Entombment; after Andrea del Sarto.
- Madonna col devoto; after the painting by Correggio, in the possession of the King of Bavaria.
- Ecce Homo; after Correggio.
- St. John; after Domenichino.
- Sibylla Persica; after Guercino.
- Ascension of the Virgin; after Guido.
- Madonna and sleeping Infant; after Raphael.
- Judgment of Solomon; after the same.
- Magdalene; after Schidone.
- Maria div. Sapientiae; after Titian.
- The Virgin Mary reading a book; after the same.
- Portrait of Galileo.
- Portrait of Machiavelli.
- Portrait of Poliziano.

He worked with Giuseppe Bortignoni the Younger in engraving ceiling decorations from the Vatican.
