= Pietro Ducros =

Italian painter

Pietro or Pierre Ducros (1745 or 1748 ^{[conflicting sources; see Talk tab]} – February 1810 in Lausanne) was a Swiss-Italian painter and engraver active in Rome

(Note: this person may possibly be the same man as Louis or Abraham-Louis-Rodolphe Ducros: See topic on Talk tab above.)

He trained in Switzerland, and mainly produced landscapes, moving to Rome as an adult, where he formed a friendship with Giovanni Volpato. Together, they assembled a series of vedute of the city and surrounding countryside. He then joined with Paolo Montagnari or Paolo Montagnari-Mirabili (which is probably a copying error for Paolo Montagnani ^{[see Talk tab on Pietro Paolo Montagnani Wiki-page]} aka, in full, as Pietro Paolo Montagnani, or Pietro Paolo Montagnani-Mirabili, a known engraver and publisher ) to publish 24 vedute of Sicily and Malta. Both these publications met with success.

The series published probably around 1789 by Montagnari included vedute of "Palermo, near Monreale"; of the "Theater of Taormina"; of the "Etna volcano"; of the "Amphitheater of Siracusa", of the "Interior of the city of Messina after the earthquake of 1783", and of the "Port of the galleys of the Arsenal of Malta".

He retired and died in Lausanne.

== Sources ==
- Füssli, Johann-Rudolf (1806). Allgemeines Künstlerlexikon, Vol. II : A-E, Zürich : Orell, Füssli & Co., p. 245. Note : biography entry of : "Cros, (Peter du)"
