= Giuseppe Bortignoni the Younger =

Italian painter

Giuseppe Bortignoni the Younger (active between 1883 and 1925) was an Italian painter of genre paintings.

His father Giuseppe Bortignoni the Elder (Bassano, 1778–1860) was a painter and engraver, known better for his latter work with Pietro Bonato and Pietro Bettelini in engraving ceiling decorations from the Vatican.

Bortignoni the Younger was born in Bologna, and was known for painting realistic genre paintings. Among his works were Il Cuoco del Convento and Don Giovanni impenitente, displayed in 1887 in Venice.

Later he worked on the restoration of old church paintings (for instance, in 1914 he renovated Pietro Rotari's Adorazione di San Francesco Borgia in Church of the Suffragio in Rimini). Also in 1914 Bortignoni compiled the third edition of the catalogue of new painting collection belonging to the dukes Massari (now a part of exposition at Palazzo Massari in Ferrara).
