= Francesco Panini =

18th-century Roman painter, draughtsman, publisher of prints

Francesco Panini or Pannini (1745–1812) was an architecture and landscape painter, draughtsman and publisher of prints from the 18th and early 19th century living in Rome, capital of the Papal States, present-day Italy.

== Early life and family ==
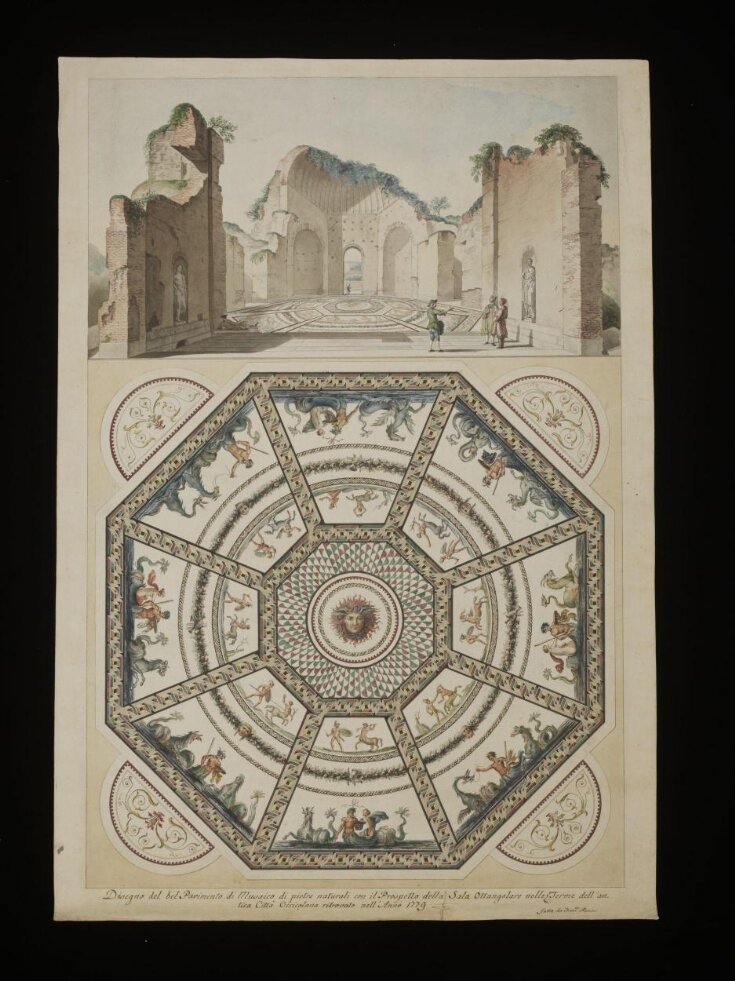
View of the ruins of the octagonal room in the ancient Roman Baths at Ocriculum (Umbria) and its floor mosaic (1779) by Francesco Panini, after an architectural design by Giuseppe Pannini, his brother. (Victoria & Albert Museum)

Francesco Panini was one of two sons of Giovanni Paolo Panini, a famed 18th-century Italian veduta painter and architect in Rome.

His brother Giuseppe Pannini was an architect and archaeologist who in 1762 completed the construction of the Trevi Fountain. The brothers worked together at different stages of their careers, as some of Francesco's drawings attest.

== Career ==
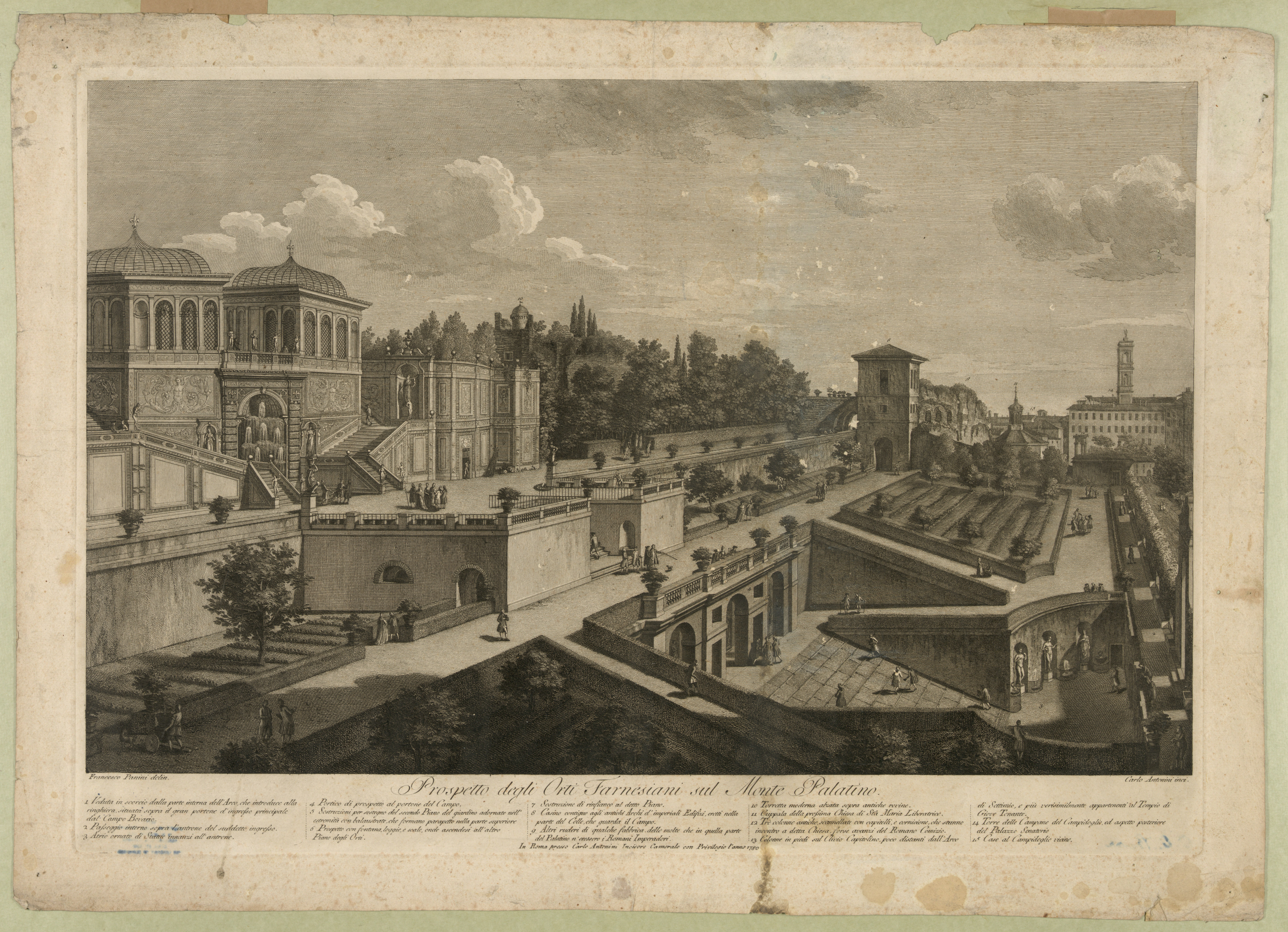
"Prospetto degli Orti Farnesiani sul Monte Palatino" (1780), signed: Carlo Antonini, inci.; Francesco Panini, delin. (Coll. Library of Congress)

Francesco Panini collaborated with a number of well-regarded engravers in late 18th-century Rome: Carlo Antonini, Francesco Barbazza, Antonio Capellan, Pier Lorenzo Mangini, Giovanni Ottaviani, Giuseppe Vasi, Giovanni Volpato, etc.

Around 1770 he created a series of hand-coloured views of the St. Peter's Basilica in the Vatican in Rome.

He then worked with Giovanni Volpato, a highly talented engraver from the Republic of Venice, who published, between 1772 and 1776, a large series of plates after the frescoes of the Raphael Rooms and the loggias at the Vatican, which gained him a considerable reputation. Some of these plates were subsequently hand-coloured by Francesco Panini and, while they did not necessarily reproduce the actual design or subjects of the loggias' vaults and pilasters, they became much in demand among visitors to Rome.

With the collaboration of Francesco Panini and Lodovico Teseo, Volpato published, between 1775 and 1777, a series of prints after frescoes painted by Annibale Carracci in the Galleria di Palazzo Farnese.

Volpato also made an impressive panorama of Rome based on Francesco Panini's drawings, part of the Rijksmuseum collection.

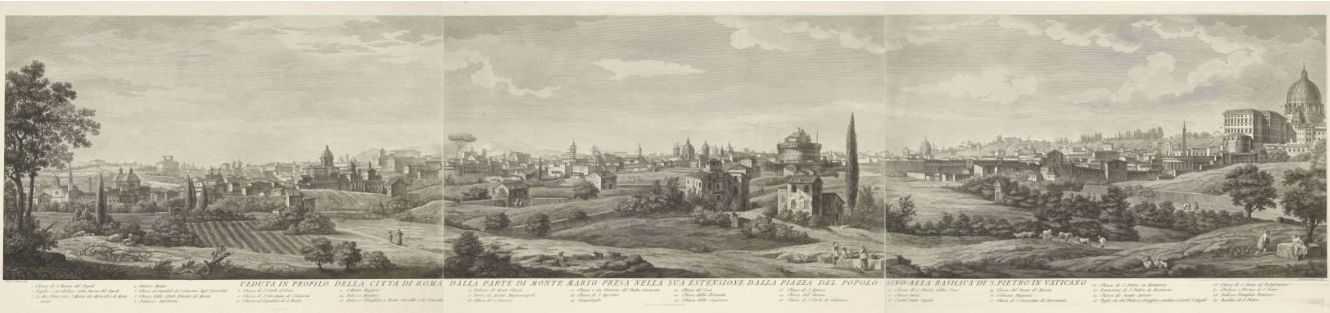
Panorama of the City of Rome, viewed from Monte Mario, by Giovanni Volpato, after Francesco Panini (Coll. Rijksmuseum Amsterdam)

Continuing in his father's tradition of drawing Roman vistas, Francesco produced several topographical engravings of Roman sights which were often coloured by hand afterwards.

He also made sometimes larger format oil paintings with subjects such as: the Adorazione dei Magi, The Temple Ruin of Vesta with figures, Rome, Architectural Capriccio with figures, A Capriccio of Hadrian's Villa in Tivoli, Classical Figures in the Ruins of a Public Building, The Rape of Helena by Paris, A Capriccio of Roman Ruins with Soldiers and Women.

For commercial reasons, Francesco copied some of his father's sought-after paintings.

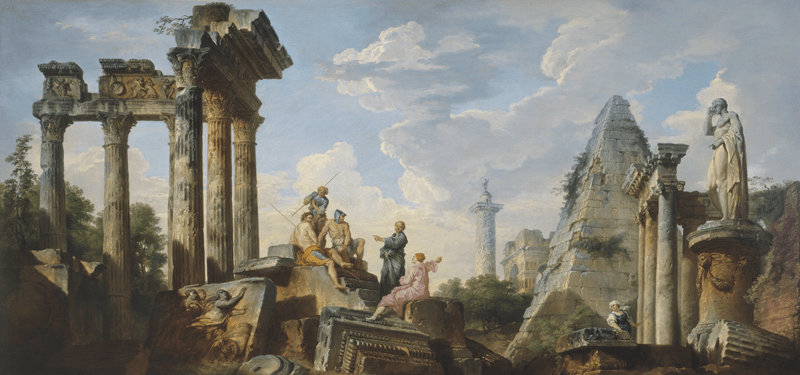
Capriccio with Roman Ruins and Figures, c. 1740–1760, Giovanni Paolo Panini (Coll. Denver Art Museum)

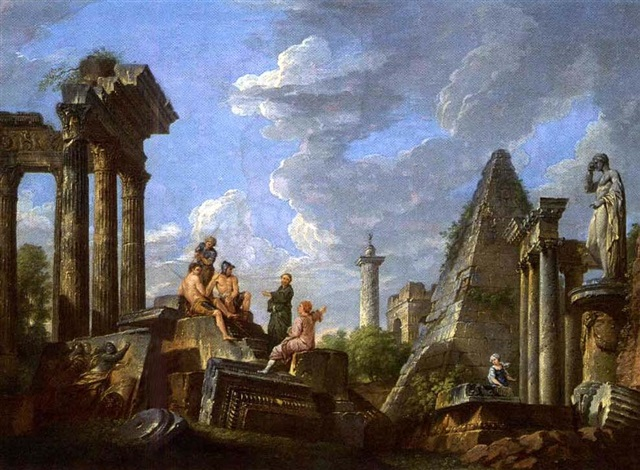
Architectural Capriccio with Figures (late 18th-C) by Francesco Panini

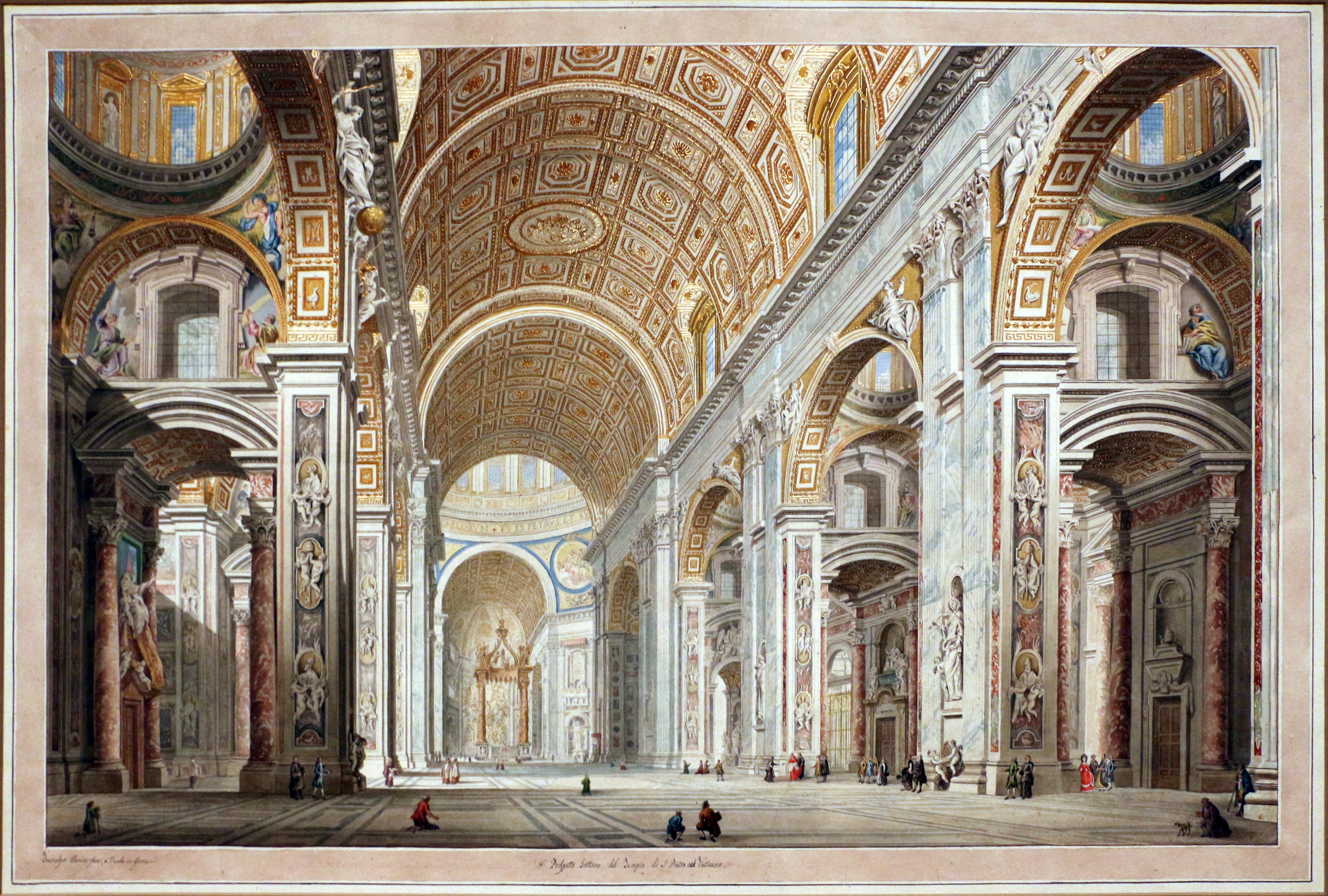
View of the interior of St Peter's Basilica in the Vatican (c. 1770) by Francesco Panini (Art Institute of Chicago)

== Works ==
- The Städel Museum in Frankfurt as well as the Royal Collection in England have a set of views of St. Peter's Basilica in Rome, by Francesco Panini, in their collections.
- The Rodolfo Lanciani Collection in Rome, Italy, holds an impressive number of original sketches and plain or coloured prints by Francesco Panini, as well as some prints by Giuseppe Pannini, his brother.
