= Pietro Paolo Montagnani =

Italian engraver and publisher (1740–?)

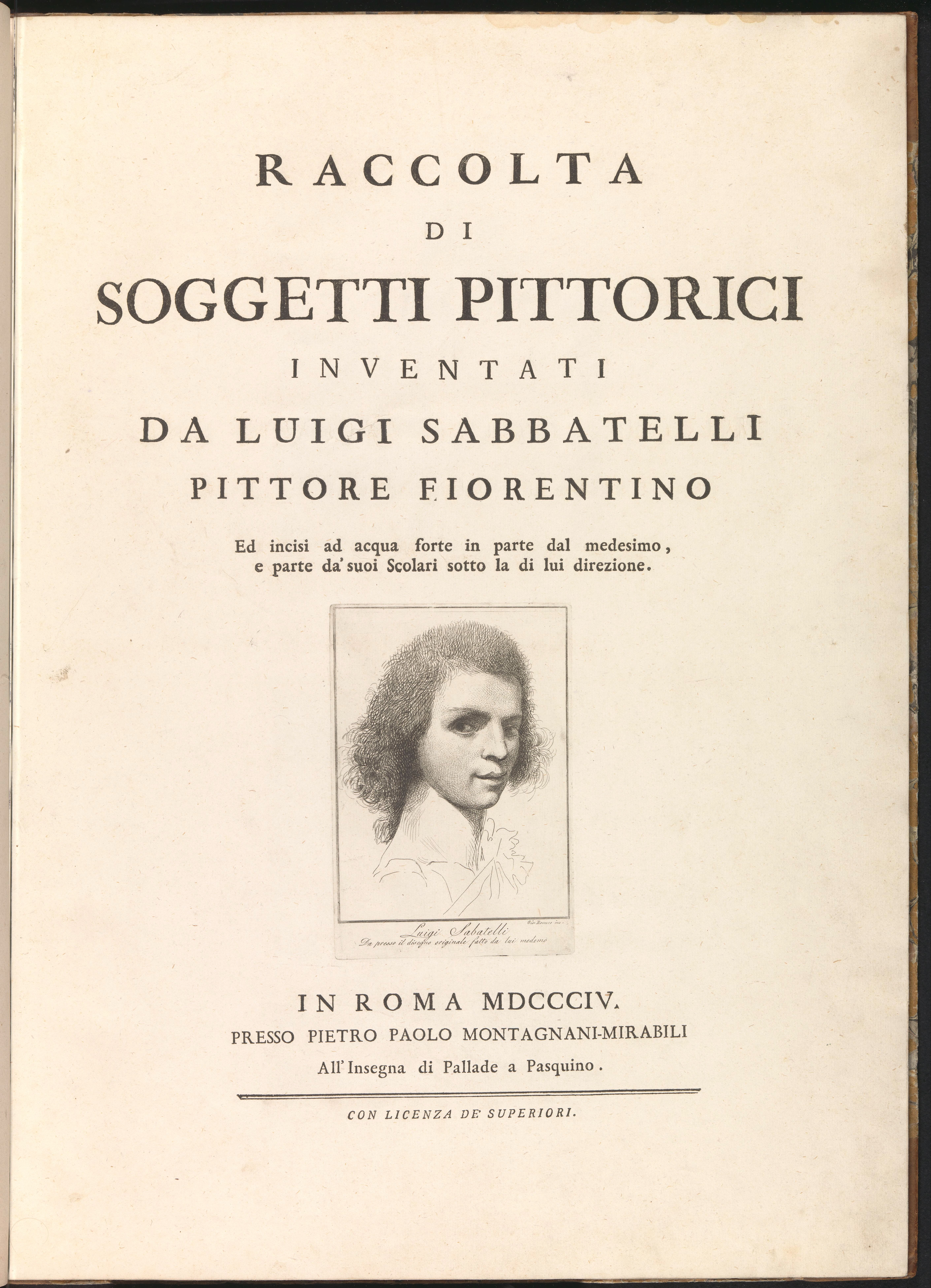
Book title page of Collection of Pictorial Subjects created by Florentine painter Luigi Sabbatelli (1804)

Pietro Paolo Montagnani (also Montagnani-Mirabili; 1740 in Rome – date of death unknown) was a late 18th-century and early 19th-century Italian engraver (burin) and publisher of books and prints who lived presumably in Florence around 1800–1820.

Around 1790, Pietro Paolo Montagnani published a series of engravings picturing the Sibyls (Latin: Sibylla, s.; -ae, pl.) by talented Italian engravers such as Girolamo Carattoni (ca.1760 – ca. 1809), Domenico Cunego, Giovanni Folo and Giovanni Petrini (active 1800–1812) after paintings by Giovanni Francesco Barbieri (il Guercino), Domenico Zampieri (il Domenichino) and Sebastiano Conca.

In 1805, Pietro Paolo Montagnani-Mirabili published a book on "ancient monuments, news on the antiquities and fine arts of Rome", Vol. VIII (or, more likely, VII, according to some scholars, attributing it to a typographical error in transcribing the Roman numeral in later imprints or facsimile editions). This book contained multiple engravings of ancient statues and bas-reliefs by Gio(vanni) Pietrini inc. (incisore, i.e. engraver) after drawings by (Aloysius) L(uigi) Agricola dis. (disegnatore, i.e. draughtsman) and F(ilip.) Salari dis.; by P(ietro) Ghigi inc. after F. Salari dis.; by Ant(onio) Ricciani inc. & G(irolamo) Carattoni inc. after drawings by L. Agricola dis.and F. Salari dis.; by L(uigi) Cunego (1750 – 1823) inc. It also contains architectural drawings engraved by Gio(vanni) Bruni inc., after drawings by Piet. Holl dis. and Micinelli dis.

Pietro Ducros (1745 or 1748-1810), a talented Swiss-born painter and engraver, joined forces with a Paolo Montagnari, who is possibly the same man as Paolo Montagnani, ^{[see Talk tab]} to publish 24 vedute of Sicily and Malta, with a certain success. The series published probably around 1789 by Montagnari included vedute of "Palermo, near Monreale"; of the "Theater of Taormina"; of the "Etna volcano"; of the "Amphitheater of Siracusa", of the "Interior of the city of Messina after the earthquake of 1783", and of the "Port of the galleys of the Arsenal of Malta".

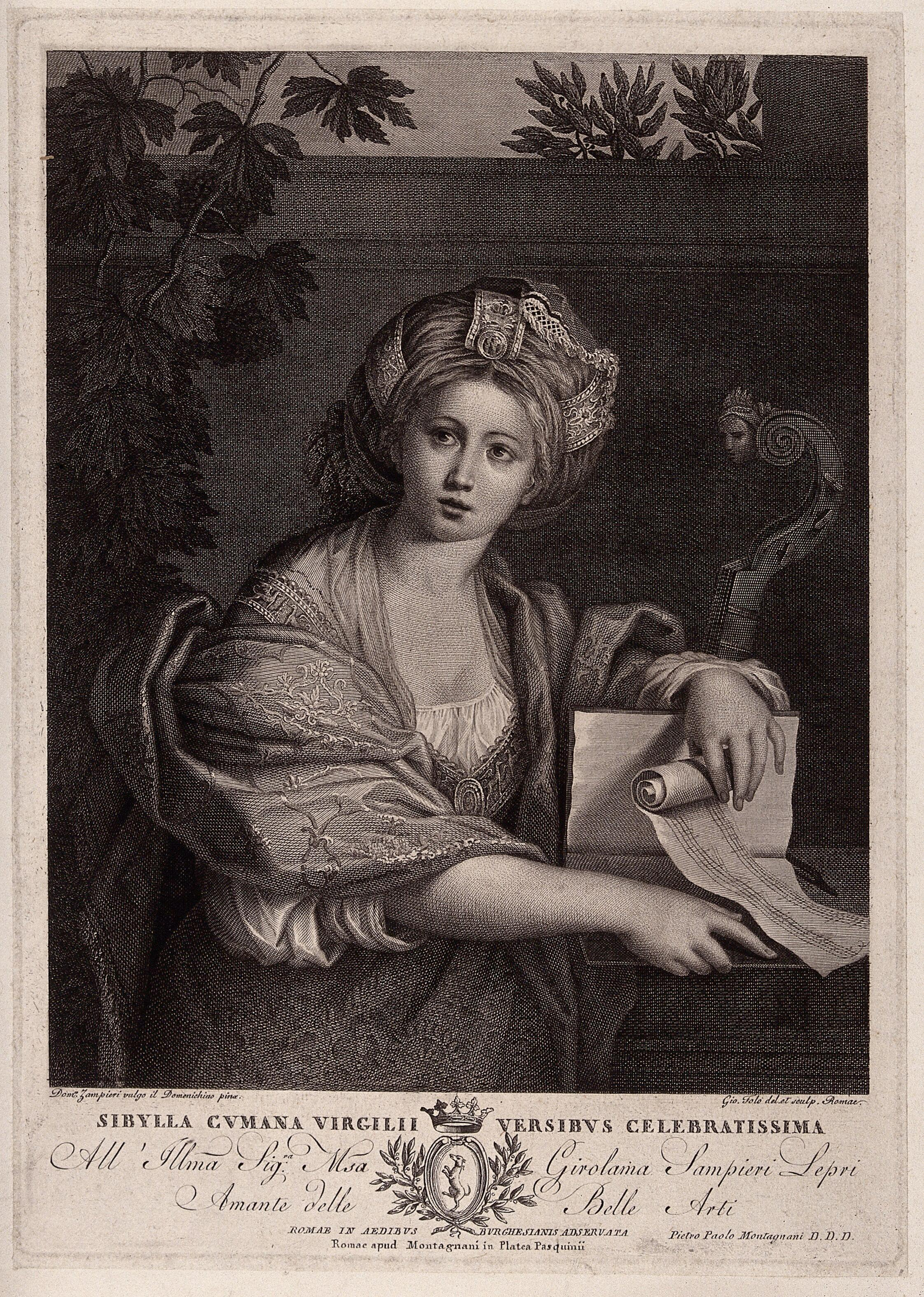
The Cumaean Sibyl, Engraving by Gio. Folo after Dom. Zampieri, il Domenichino (c. 1790)

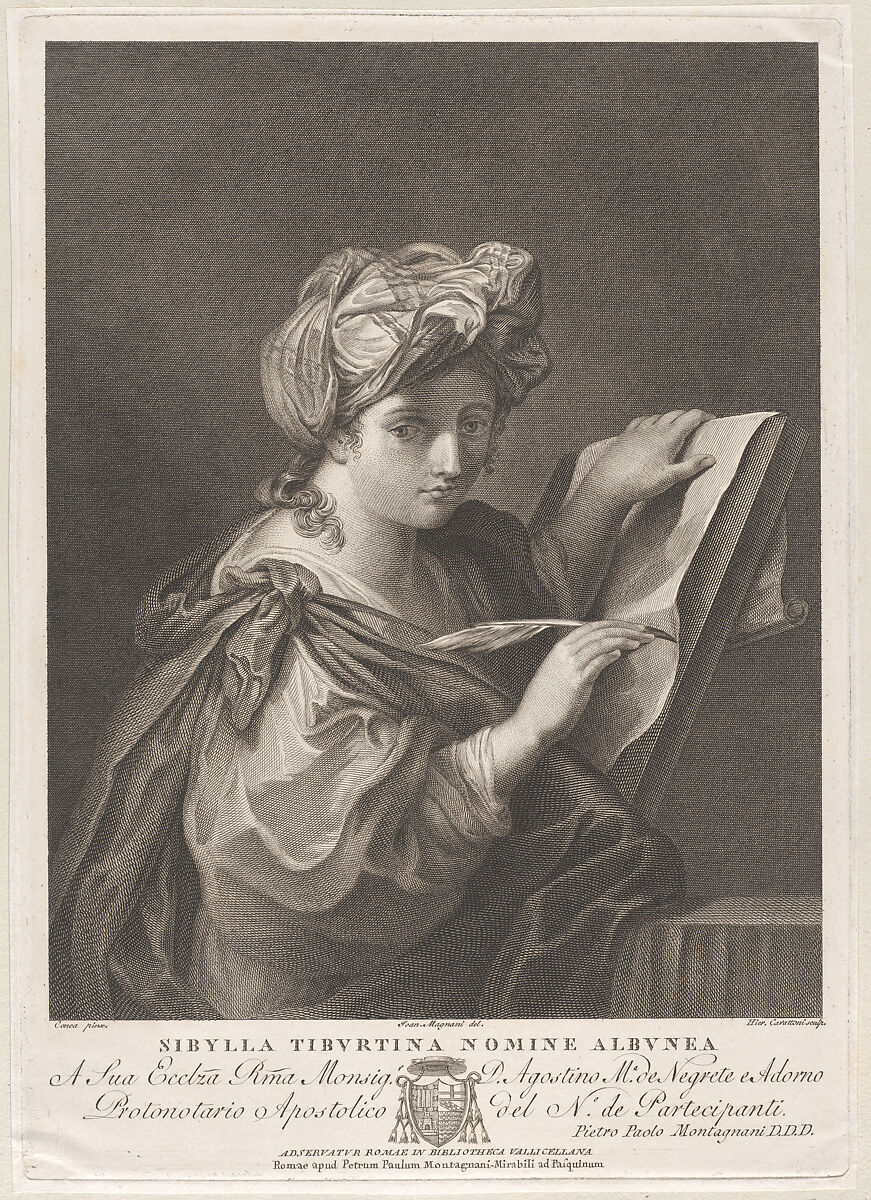
The Tiburtine Sibyl. Engraving by G. Carattoni & G. Magnani after S. Conca (ca.1790)

== Publications ==
- "Accurata e succinta descrizione topografica delle antichità di Roma dell'abate Ridolfino Venuti Cortonese". (in Italian). [Accurate and succinct topographical description of the antiquities of Rome by Abbot Ridolfino Venuti Cortonese]. Vol. 1 (2nd ed.) & Vol. 2 (2nd ed.); Roma : Presso Pietro Paolo Montagnani-Mirabili (1803).
- "Monumenti Antichi Inediti, spiegati ed illustrati da Giovanni Winckelmann, prefetto delle antichità di Roma". (in Italian). [Unpublished ancient monuments, explained and illustrated by Giovanni Winckelmann, prefect of antiquities in Rome]. Vol. I & Vol. II (2nd ed.) (1821). Roma : Dai torchj di Carlo Mordacchini; Note: Vol. I is dedicated by Pietro Paolo Montagnani-Mirabili (editor) to Alberto Thorvaldsen.
- "Monumenti Antichi Inediti Ovvero Notizie Sulle Antichità E Belle Arti Di Roma". (in Italian). [Unpublished ancient monuments, or, news on the antiquities and fine arts of Rome]. Vols. I - VI (1784-1789), Vol. VII (1805). Note: Vols. I-II are dedicated by Giuseppe Antonio Guattani (publisher, 1748–1830), to Pope Pius VI and Peter Duke of Courland (1724 - 1800) respectively. Vol. VII is dedicated by Pietro Paolo Montagnani-Mirabili (publisher) to Luigi Marconi (born, Florence, ca. 1805?).
- "Raccolta di Soggetti Pittorici inventati da Luigi Sabbatelli pittore Fiorentina". (in Italian). [Collection of Pictorial Subjects created by Florentine painter Luigi Sabbatelli], with 42 engravings by Damiano Pernati inc. after paintings by Luigi Sabbatelli. Roma: Presso Pietro Paolo Montagnani-Mirabili (1804).
- "Raccolta di pitture etrusche tratte dagli antichi vasi esistenti nella Biblioteca Vaticana ed in altri musei d'Italia". (in Italian). [Collection of Etruscan paintings from ancient vases in the Vatican Library and other museums in Italy]. Vol. 1 (1806), Vol. 2 (1806), Vol. 3 (1806)
- "Il Museo capitolino e li monumenti antichi che sono nel Campidoglio". (in Italian). [The Capitoline Museum and the ancient monuments in the Roman Capitol]. Vol. 1 (1820); Vol. 2 (1820); Vol. 3 (1821); Vol. 4 (1826) of a total of 13 volumes, which are still available as an reprint today. Collaborators on Vols. 1 & 2 were G(iacomo) Bossi dis. e inc. (1750-1804), Gio(vanni) Petrini dis. e inc. (born, Rome, ca. 1750); L. Agricola dis., G(iuseppe) Perini inc.
- "Esposizione descrittiva delle pitture di Raffaello Sanzio da Urbino nelle stanze vaticane, data alla luce da Pietro Paolo Montagnani". (in Italian). [Descriptive Exhibition of the Paintings of Raffaello Sanzio da Urbino (aka Raphael) in the Vatican Rooms, brought to light by Pietro Paolo Montagnani]. Roma: Stamperia della Rev. Cam. Apost. (1828)
- "Illustrazione storico-pittorica con incisioni a contorni delle pitture di Raffaello Sanzio da Urbino nel Vaticano : accresciuta di sopra venti soggetti inediti, data alla luce da Pietro Paolo Montagnani." (in Italian). [Historical and pictorial illustration with contour engravings of Raffaello Sanzio from Urbino's paintings in the Vatican : enhanced with over twenty unpublished subjects, brought to light by Pietro Paolo Montagnani]. Roma: Domenico Ercole (1834)
- "Illustrazione storico-pittorica con incisioni a contorni dei dipinti della Gran Sala detta di Costantino presso le Stanze di Raffaello Sanzio da Urbino nel Vaticano : accresciuta di diciotto soggetti inediti, data alla luce da Pietro Paolo Montagnani". (in Italian). [Historical and pictorial illustration with contour engravings of the paintings in the Great Hall known as Constantine's room in the Raffaello Sanzio from Urbino Rooms in the Vatican : enhanced with 18 unpublished subjects, brought to light by Pietro Paolo Montagnani]. Roma : Domenico Ercole (1834)
