= Giovacchino Cantini =

Giovacchino Cantini (c. 1780–1844) was an Italian engraver, active in Florence as one of Raffaello Sanzio Morghen's most successful pupils. He engraved a Virgin and Child, with Saints Sebastian & Anthony after Fra Bartolommeo; a Virgin with her hands folded after Pompeo Batoni; Judith with the Head of Holofernes after Allori (1802); The Holy Family after Leonardo da Vinci; St. Peter walking on the Sea after Cigoli; and Portrait of Michelangelo Buonarroti after Vasari.
