= Giovanni Volpato =

Italian engraver

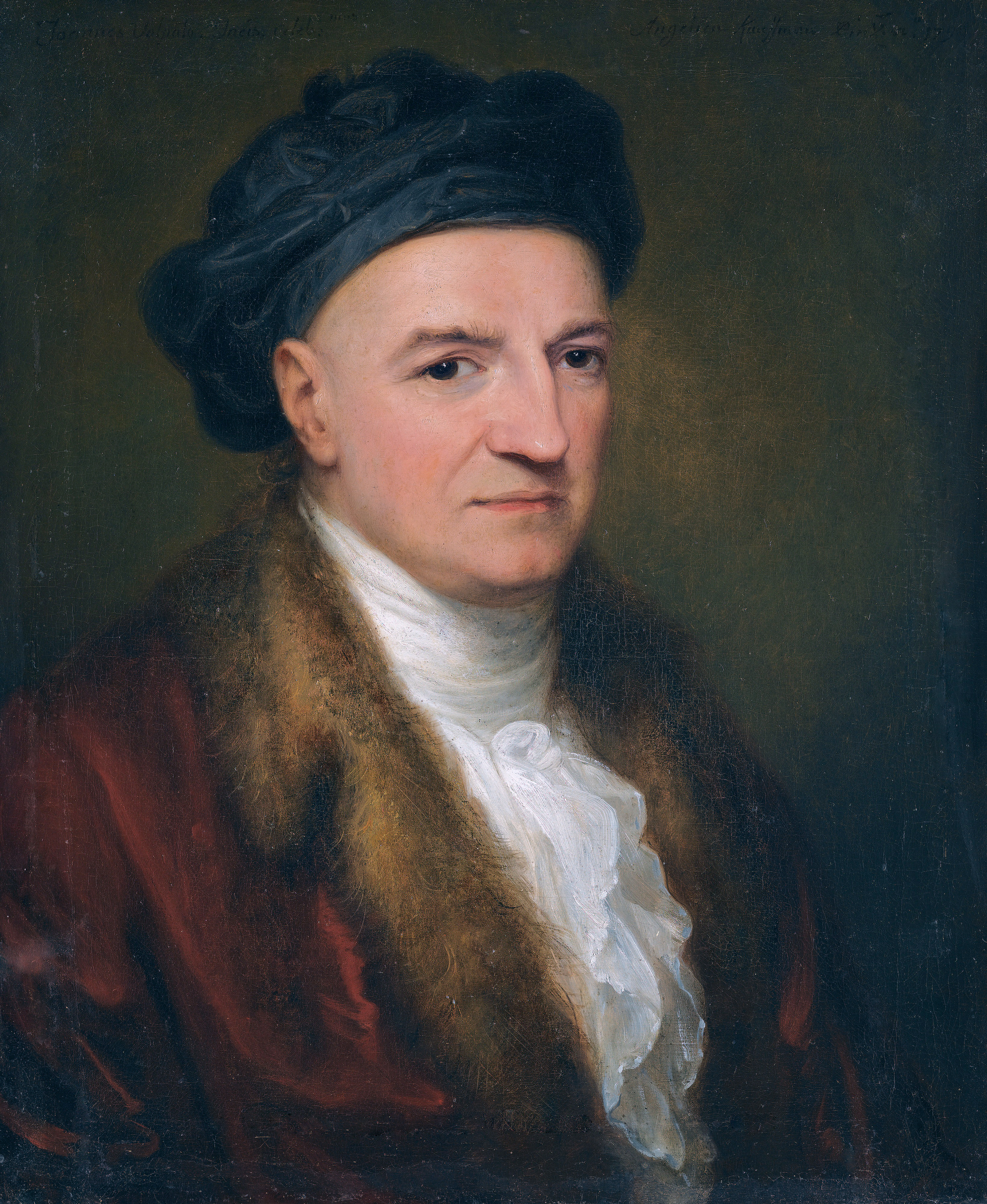
Giovanni Volpato (Angelica Kauffman, 1794/5)

Giovanni Volpato (1735 – 25 August 1803) was an Italian engraver. He was also an excavator, dealer in antiquities and manufacturer of biscuit porcelain figurines.

== Biography ==
Giovanni Volpato was born in Bassano del Grappa (then part of the Republic of Venice). He received his first training from his mother, an embroiderer, and then studied under Giovanni Antonio Remondini. In 1762 he went to Venice and worked with Joseph Wagner and Francesco Bartolozzi, engraving several plates after Piazzetta, Mariotto, Amiconi, Zuccarelli, Marco Ricci and others. He worked for some time for the Duke of Parma, until a plate of the Monument of Francesco Algarotti in Pisa brought him wider notice.

In 1771, following a suggestion of his patron Girolamo Zulian, he moved to Rome, where he founded a school of engraving and gained a reputation for his series of plates after the frescoes of the Raphael Rooms and Loggias in the Vatican (1770–77). Some of these plates were hand-coloured by Francesco Panini, and did not necessarily reproduce the actual design or subjects of the Loggias' vaults and pilasters, but they became much in demand among visitors to Rome. Volpato made this impressive panorama of Rome based on Francesco Panini's drawings, part of the Rijksmuseum collection:

"Panorama of the City of Rome", viewed from Monte Mario, by Giovanni Volpato, after Francesco Panini (Coll. Rijksmuseum Amsterdam)

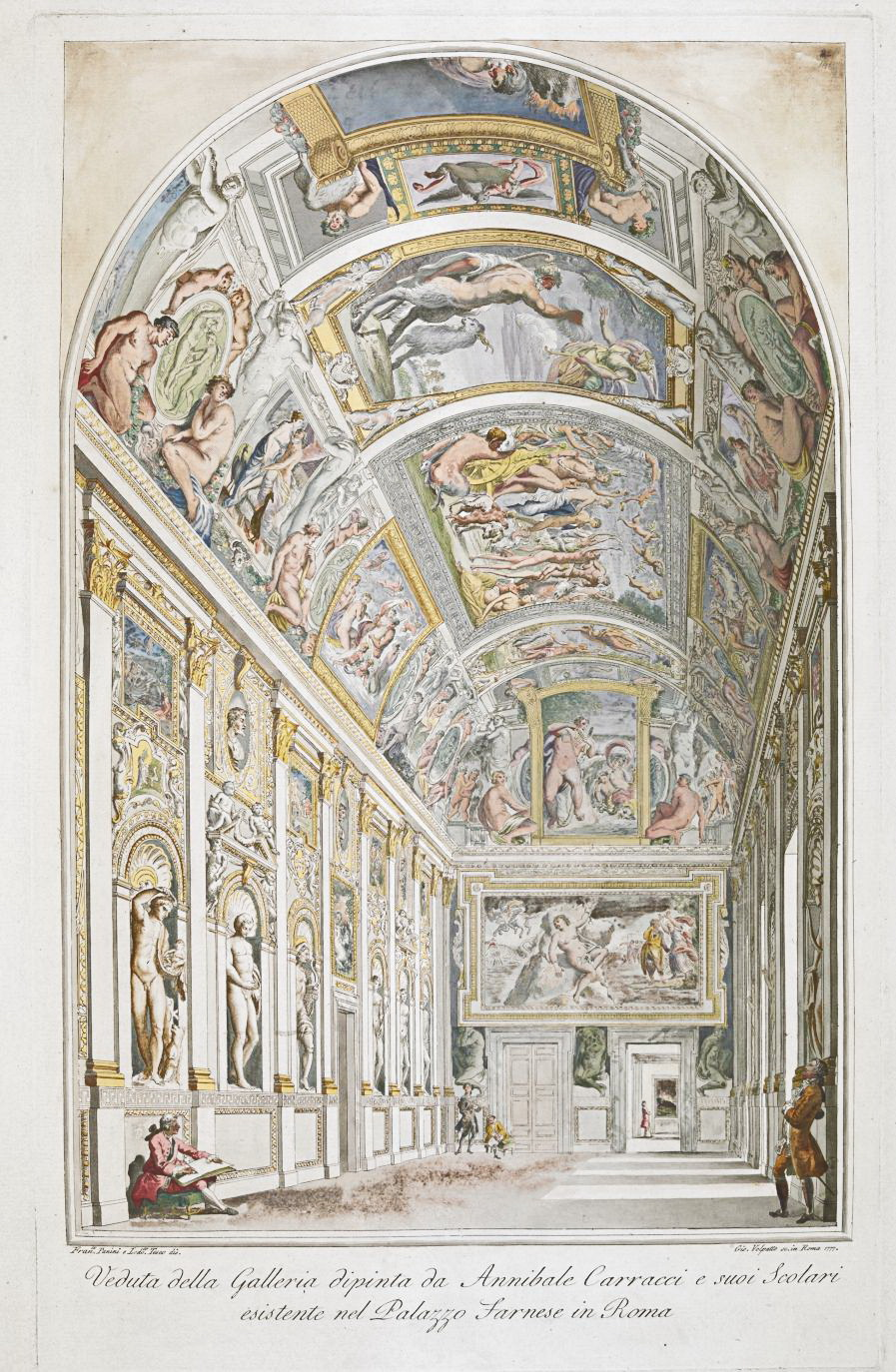
"View of the Gallery painted by Annibale Carracci and his Scholars existing in the Palazzo Farnese in Rome" (1777); Sign.: ''Fran.co Panini and Lodo.co Teseo dis. Gio. Volpato sc. in Rome 1777'' (British Library)

With the collaboration of Francesco Panini and Lodovico Teseo, on one hand, and, together with Pietro Bettelini, on the other hand, a series of prints after frescoes painted by Annibale Carracci in the Galleria di Palazzo Farnese, were published by Volpato between 1775 and 1777.

He engraved a series of landscapes and vedute of Rome with Pietro Ducros.

Volpato was a friend of the British painter and antiquarian, Gavin Hamilton. When Volpato himself became an excavator, he supplied Hamilton with some sculptures and engravings for his Schola Italica Picturae, while Hamilton introduced him to clients interested in his findings and publications.

Volpato made excavations in Ostia (1779, with the antiquarian Thomas Jenkins), Porta San Sebastiano (1779) and Quadraro (1780); and sold sculptures to king Gustav III of Sweden (1784), to the Vatican Museums, and to the British collector, Henry Blundell. In 1788 he sold the celebrated Lante Vase to Colonel John Campbell. In 1792, in collaboration with Louis Ducros, he published a series of prints of the interiors of the new Museo Pio-Clementino.

In 1785, he established a porcelain factory that made ceramic replicas of Greco-Roman originals to satisfy the demand for antique art during the Neoclassic period.

In 1789, Volpato collaborated with the architect Giuseppe Pannini, brother of Francesco, on commemorative prints of the Santa Maria in Monserrato degli Spagnoli church, on the occasion of the death of Charles III of Spain in 1788.

One of his pupils was his son in law, Raffaello Morghen. Volpato died in Rome.

I Burattini, c. 1770

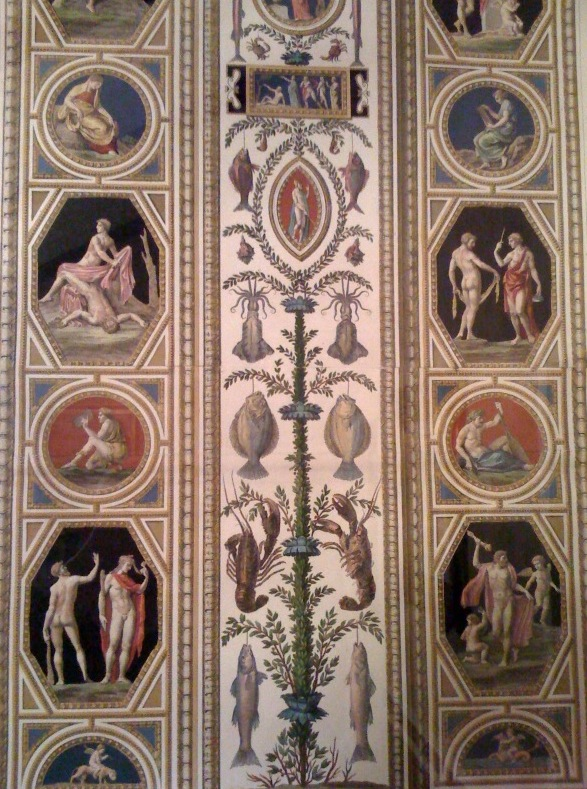
Detail of a pilaster of the Raphael's Loggia with marine fauna and mythological subjects. Engraving, 1774

Among his plates for Gavin Hamilton are:

- Marriage of Alexander and Roxana.
- The four Sibyls; after Raphael.
- Perseus and Andromeda; after Polidoro da Caravaggio
- Modesty ami Vanity; after Leonardo da Vinci.
- Christ praying at the Mount; after Correggio.
- Feast in the house of Simon; after Paolo Veronese
- The Marriage of Cana; after Tintoretto.
- Gamblers after Michelangelo da Caravaggio.
