= Raffaello Sanzio Morghen =

Italian engraver

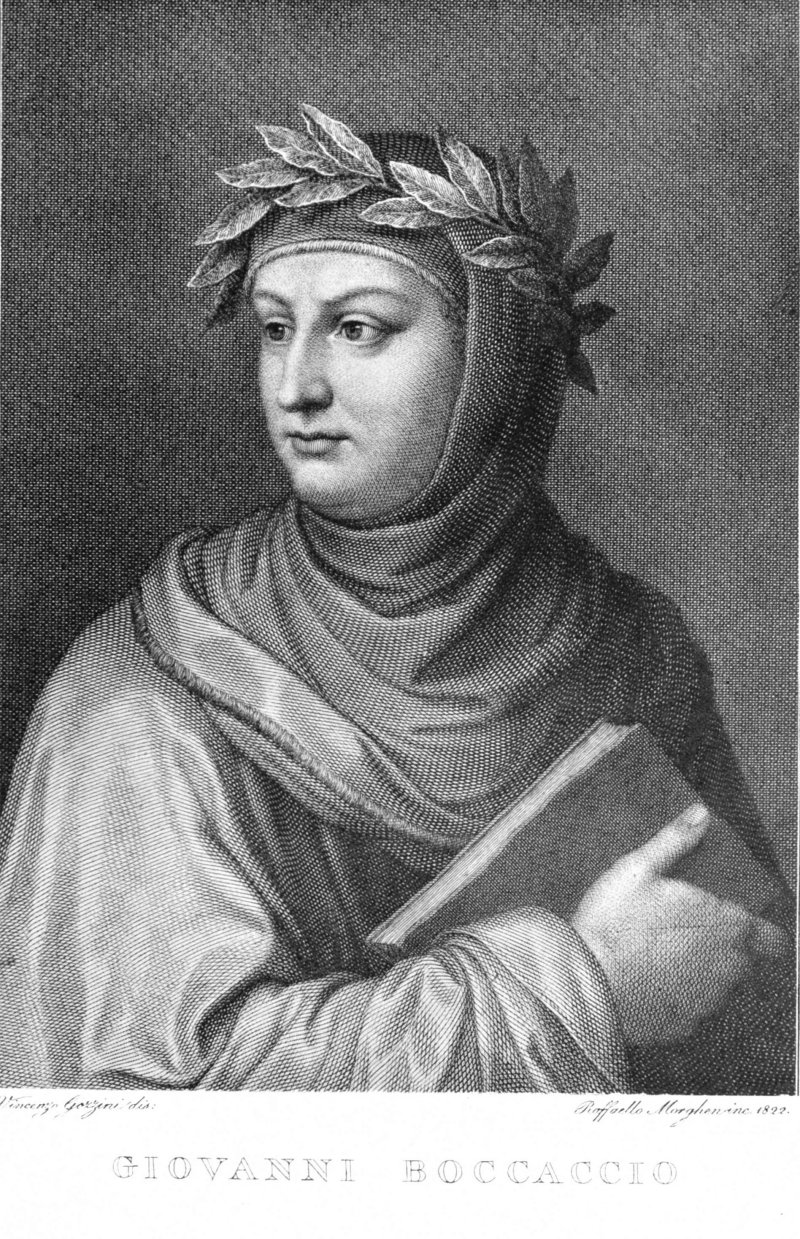
Giovanni Boccaccio by Morghen, after Vinzenzo Gozzoni

Raffaello Morghen (19 June 1758 – 8 April 1833) was an Italian engraver.

== Life ==
He was born in Naples, apparently to a German family of engravers. He received his earliest instructions from his father, himself an engraver; but, to obtain more advanced training, he was placed as a pupil under the celebrated Giovanni Volpato. He assisted this master in engraving the famous pictures of Raphael in the Vatican City, and the print which represents the miracle of Bolsena is inscribed with his name. He married Volpato's daughter, Domenica, in 1782, and, being invited to Florence to engrave the masterpieces of the Florentine Gallery, he moved there with his wife in the same year. His reputation now became so great as to induce the artists of Florence to recommend him to the Grand Duke as a fit person to engrave the Last Supper of Leonardo da Vinci; apart, however, from the dilapidated state of the picture itself, the drawing made for Morghen was unworthy of the original, and the print, in consequence, although an admirable production, fails to convey a correct idea of the style and merit of Leonardo. Morghen's fame, however, soon extended over Europe; and the Institute of France, as a mark of their admiration of his talents, elected him an associate in 1803. In 1812 Napoleon invited him to Paris and paid him the most flattering attentions. He died in Florence. He is buried in the Church of Santa Croce in Florence.

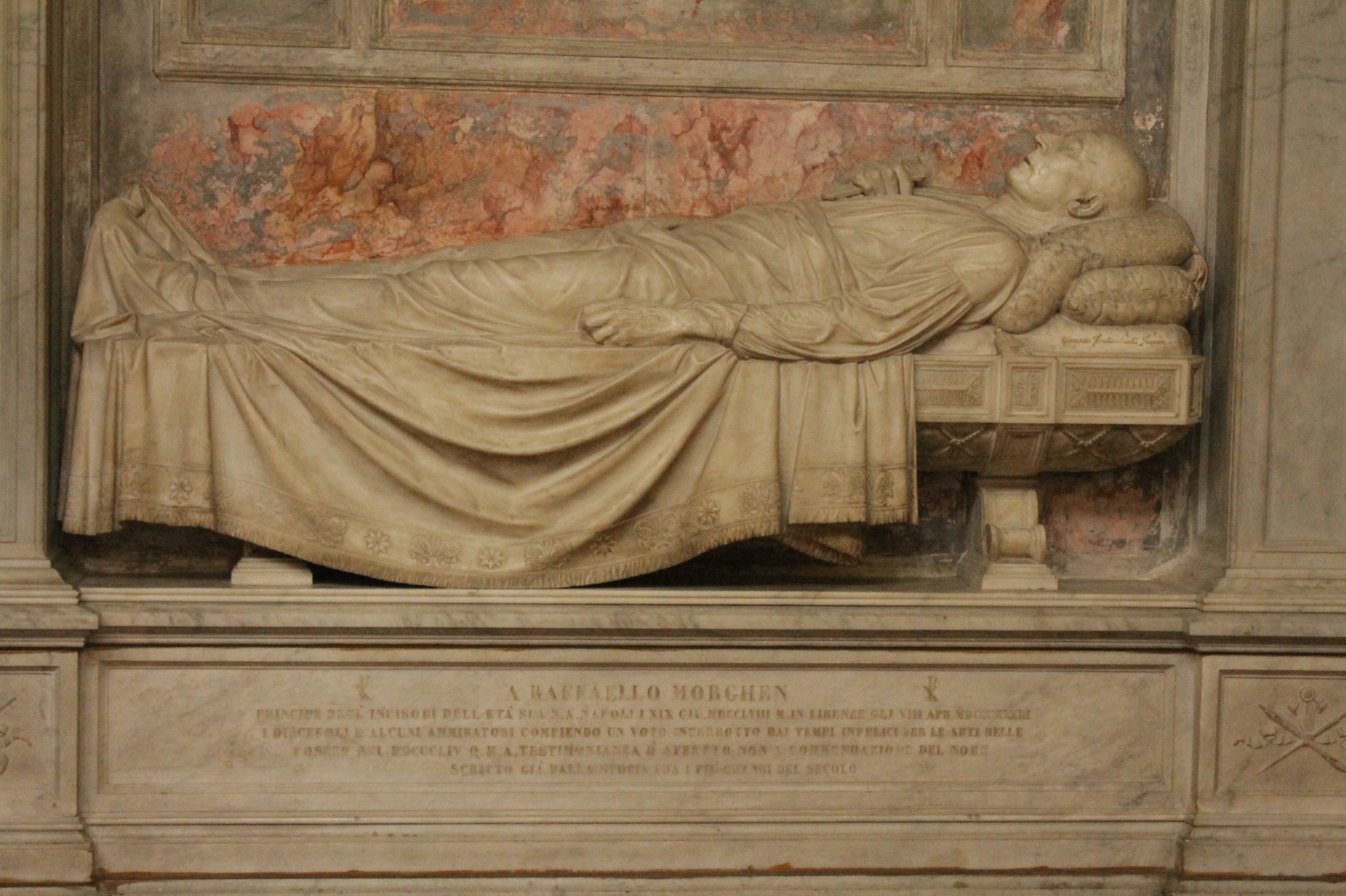
The grave of Raffaello Morghen, Santa Croce, Florence

== Works ==
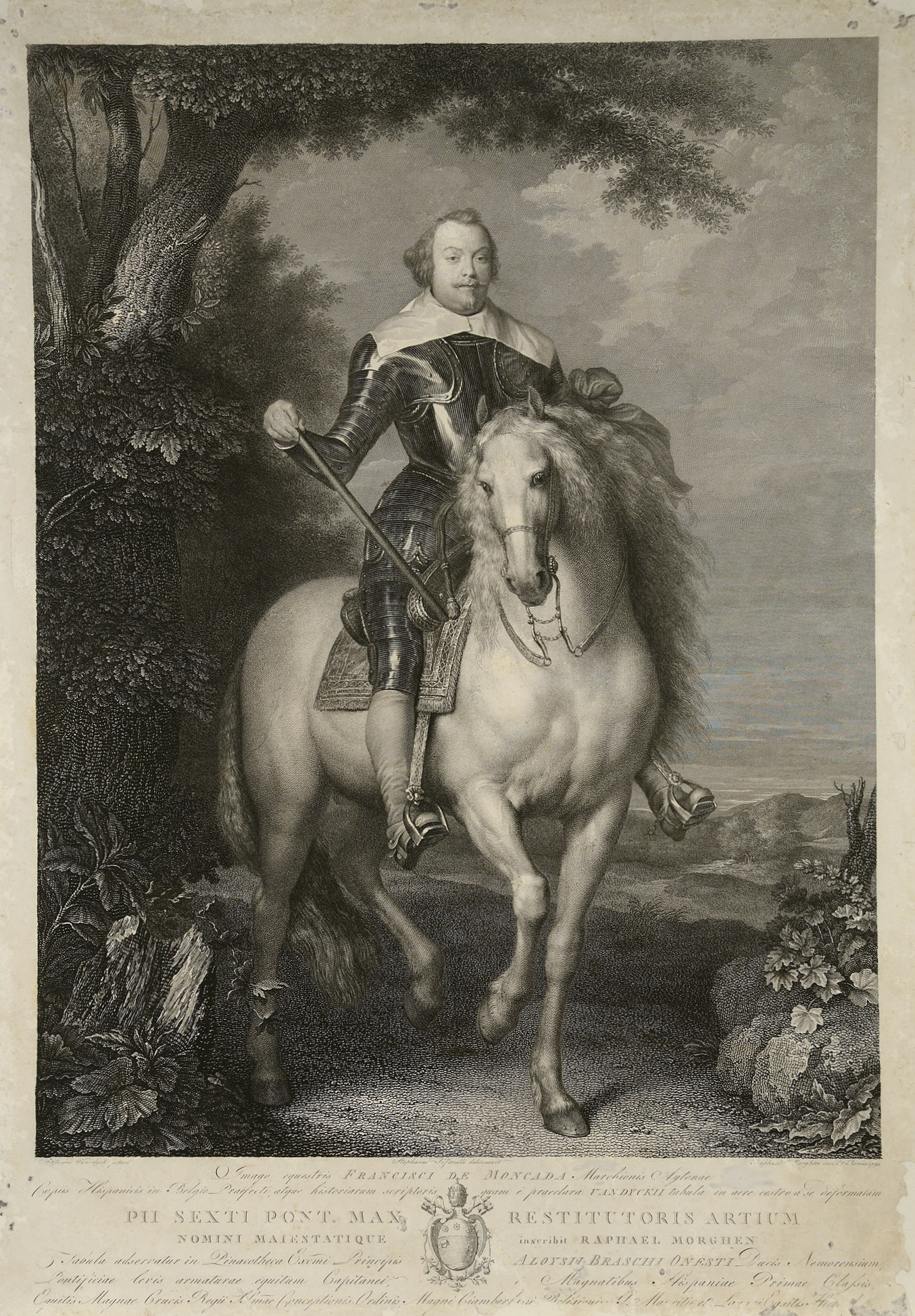
Morghen's engraving of Anthony van Dyck’s equestrian portrait of Francisco de Moncada, Marquess of Aytona, dated 1793

A series of 8 prints by Morghen after Louis Ducros was published between 1784 and 1786.

A list of the artist's works, published at Florence in 1810, comprised 200 compositions; the number was afterwards considerably increased. Other than those mentioned above, the most notable include his engravings of Raphael's Transfiguration, a Mary Magdalene by Murillo, a Head of the Saviour by Leonardo, Guido Reni's Aurora, Poussin's A Dance to the Music of Time and The Flight into Egypt, Domenichino's Archery Contest of Diana and her Nymphs, Van Dyck's Portrait of Francesco de Moncada and anonymous portraits of Dante, Petrarch, Leonardo, Ariosto, Tasso and other famous men. They also include engravings of Antonio Canova's Theseus and the Minotaur and the same sculptor's monument to Pope Clement XIII.

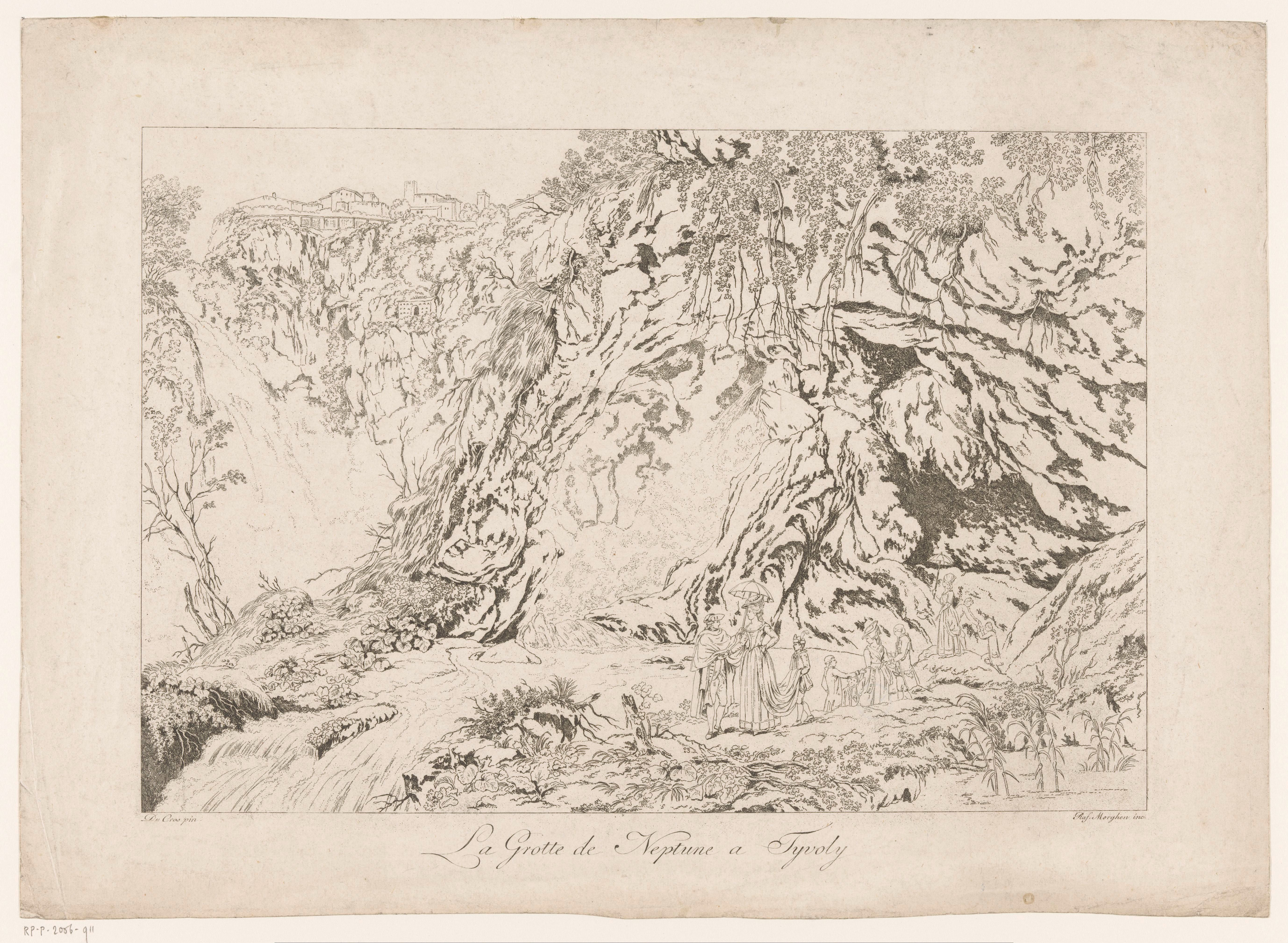
"View of the grotto of Neptune in Tivoli", engraving (c.1780-1784) by Raffaello Morghen, after Louis Ducros

His prints have hardly maintained the reputation which they enjoyed during the artist's lifetime. Though carefully and delicately executed, they were described as somewhat mechanical and wanting in force and spirit.

Giovanni Folo of Bassano was a pupil of Volpato, then of Morghen himself. Giovacchino Cantini was also a pupil of Morghen.

== Sources ==
- Catholic Encyclopedia article
- Iscrizioni e memorie della città di Firenze By Francesco Bigazzi (googlebooks) pages 178–179.
